= Greeks Gate =

- Bieb il-Griegi
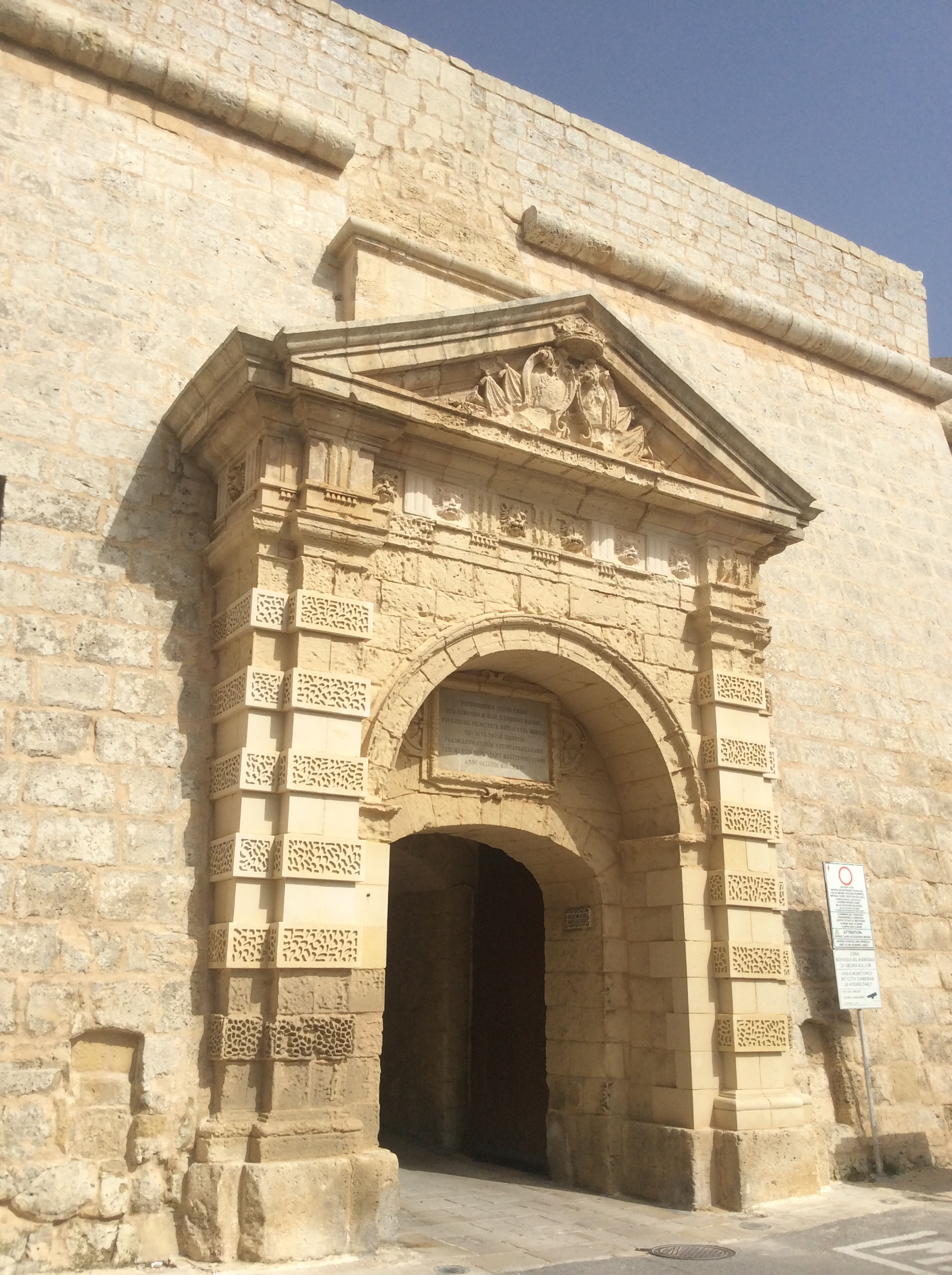
- View of the Greeks Gate
- Interactive map of the Greeks Gate area

General information
- Status: Intact
- Type: City gate
- Architectural style: Medieval and Baroque
- Location: Mdina, Malta
- Coordinates: 35°53′8.73″N 14°24′6.13″E
- Construction started: Medieval period
- Renovated: 1724
- Owner: Government of Malta

Technical details
- Material: Limestone

Renovating team
- Architect: Charles François de Mondion

The Greeks Gate (Maltese: Bieb il-Griegi or Il-Mina tal-Griegi; Italian: Porta dei Greci; Latin: Porta Grecorum) is a gate into the fortified city of Mdina, Malta. The gate was originally built in the medieval period, and its outer portal was built in the Baroque style in 1724 by Charles François de Mondion. Despite this, the rear part of its gate retains its original form, making it one of the few visible remains of Mdina's medieval walls.

== History ==
The Greeks Gate is one of two main gates of Mdina, the other being the Mdina Gate. It is located near the southwest corner of the city, and it got its name since a small Greek community once lived close to the gate. This gate was the only entrance into Mdina from which slaves were allowed to enter.

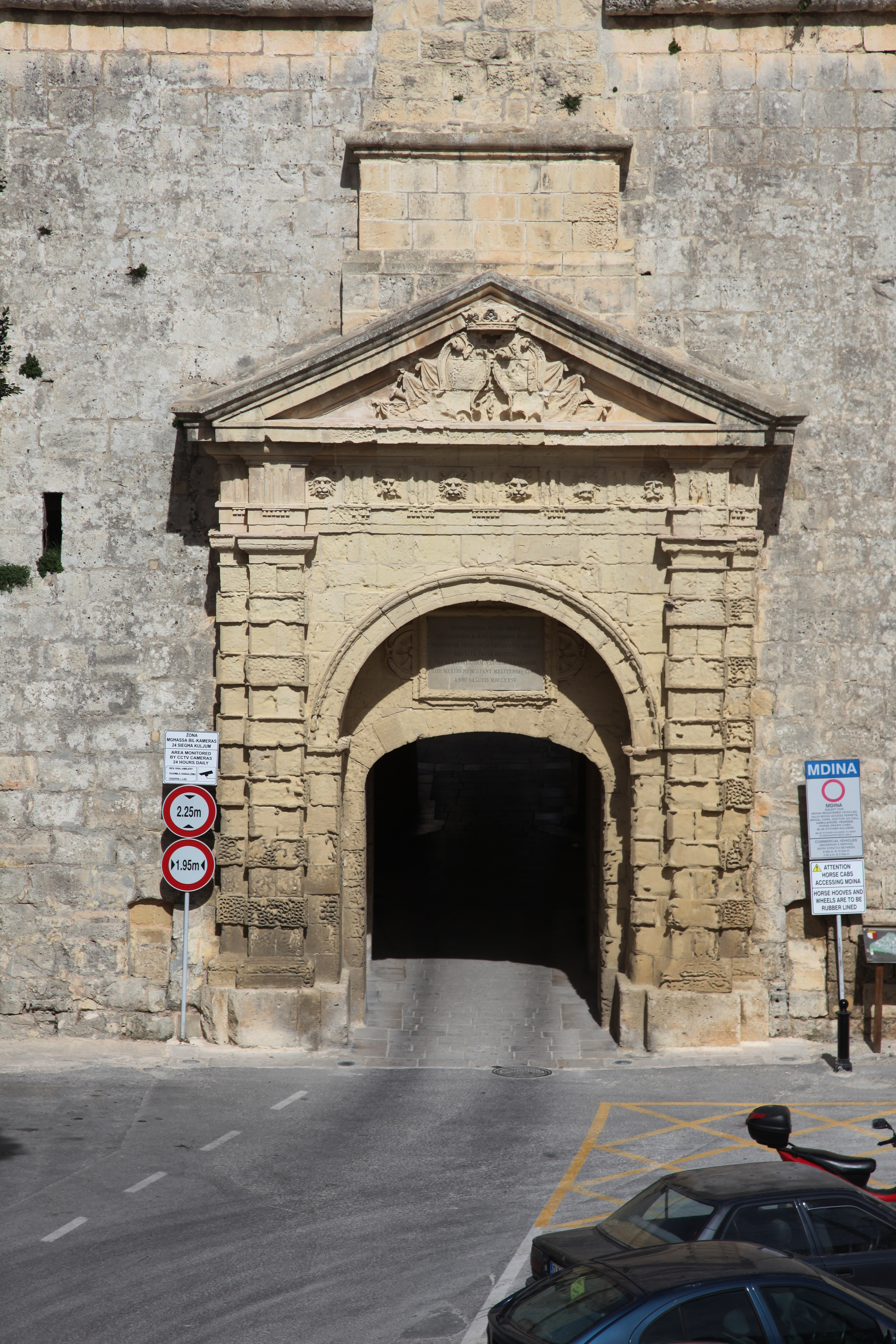
Greeks Gate in 2010, before it was restored

In the medieval period, the Greeks Gate was flanked by a D-shaped wall tower, which remained in use until the early 18th century, when Mdina's fortifications were upgraded under the military engineer and architect Charles François de Mondion. It is believed that the tower still exists buried behind Mondion's ramparts. At this point, Mondion also grafted a Baroque portal onto the Greeks Gate, giving it its present appearance. The inscription on the gate which commemorates this renovation is dated 1724.

The Greeks Gate was restored between January and June 2003 by the Restoration Unit of the Ministry for Resources and Infrastructure. Restoration cost Lm15,000, and it included cleaning the gate, consolidating its decorative elements, and removal of vegetation on the roof. Plans for another restoration were made in 2014, when the government allocated €1 million of ERDF funds for the restoration of Greeks Gate and the surrounding areas. Restoration of the gate commenced in late 2015 and was completed in early 2016.

The Greeks Gate was included on the Antiquities List of 1925. Today, it is scheduled as a Grade 1 national monument, and it is also listed on the National Inventory of the Cultural Property of the Maltese Islands.

== Architecture ==
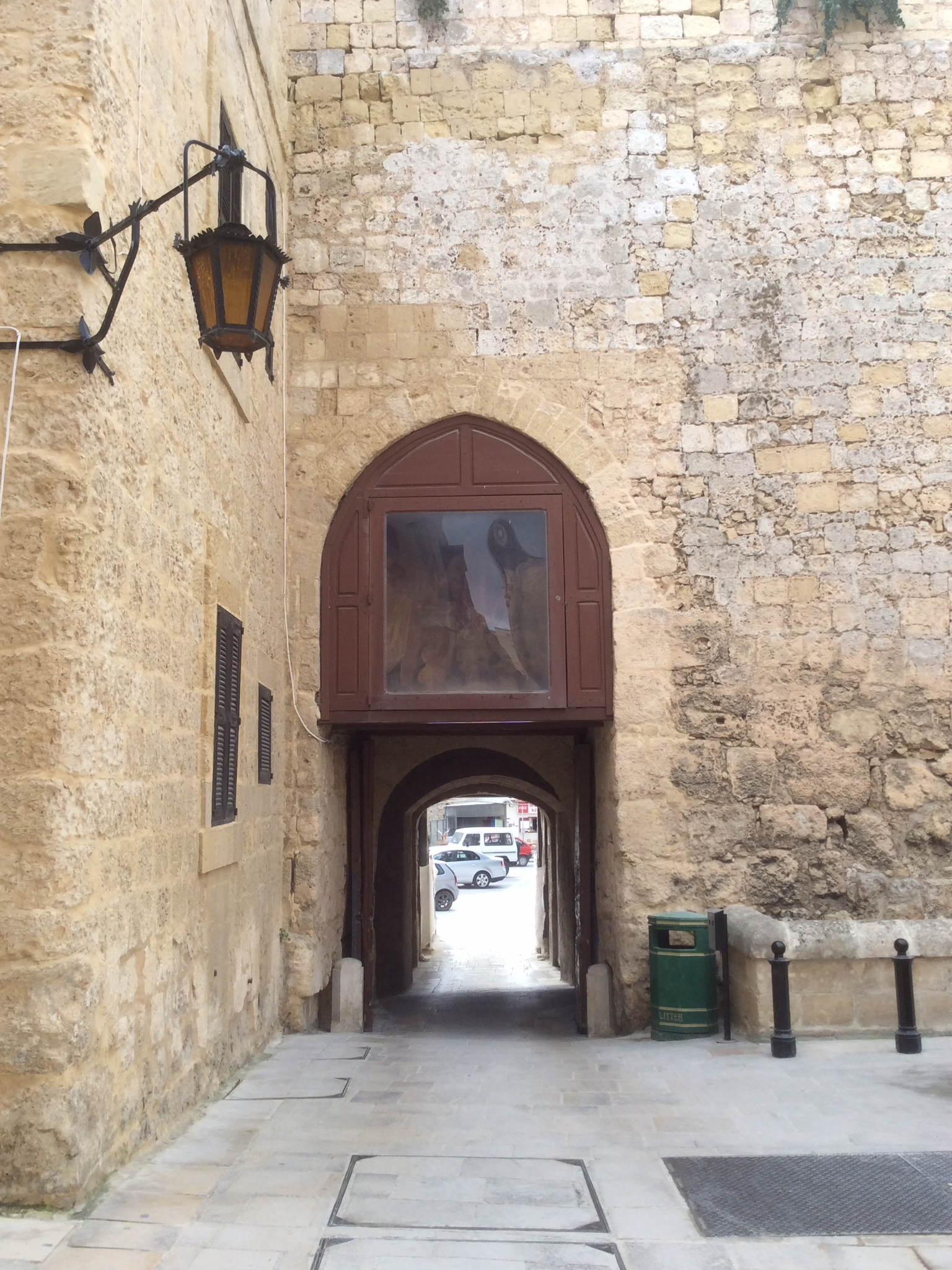
The gate viewed from the rear

The Greeks Gate actually consists of two vaulted gateways grafted in front of each other. The inner gate still retains its original medieval features, including a pointed arch. A guardhouse was located inside the passageway between the gates. The outer gate consists of a Baroque portal, decorated with various coats of arms and a Latin inscription reading:

VETUSTISSIMÆ HUJUS URBIS
SUB SERENISS. M. MAG. D. ANTONII MANOEL
FELICISSIMO PRINCIPATU RESTAURATA MOENIA
TUO, DIVE PAULE, HOSPITO,
PRÆDICATIONE, QUAM VETUSTATE, CLARIORE
TIBI MERITO NUNCUPANT MELITENSES CIVES
ANNO SALUTIS MDCCXXIV.

The upper part of Greeks Gate contains a mural and oil paintings, one representing the Virgin and Child with Saint Anne and the Trinity, and the other showing the Baptism of Saint Publius by Paul the Apostle accompanied by Luke the Evangelist.

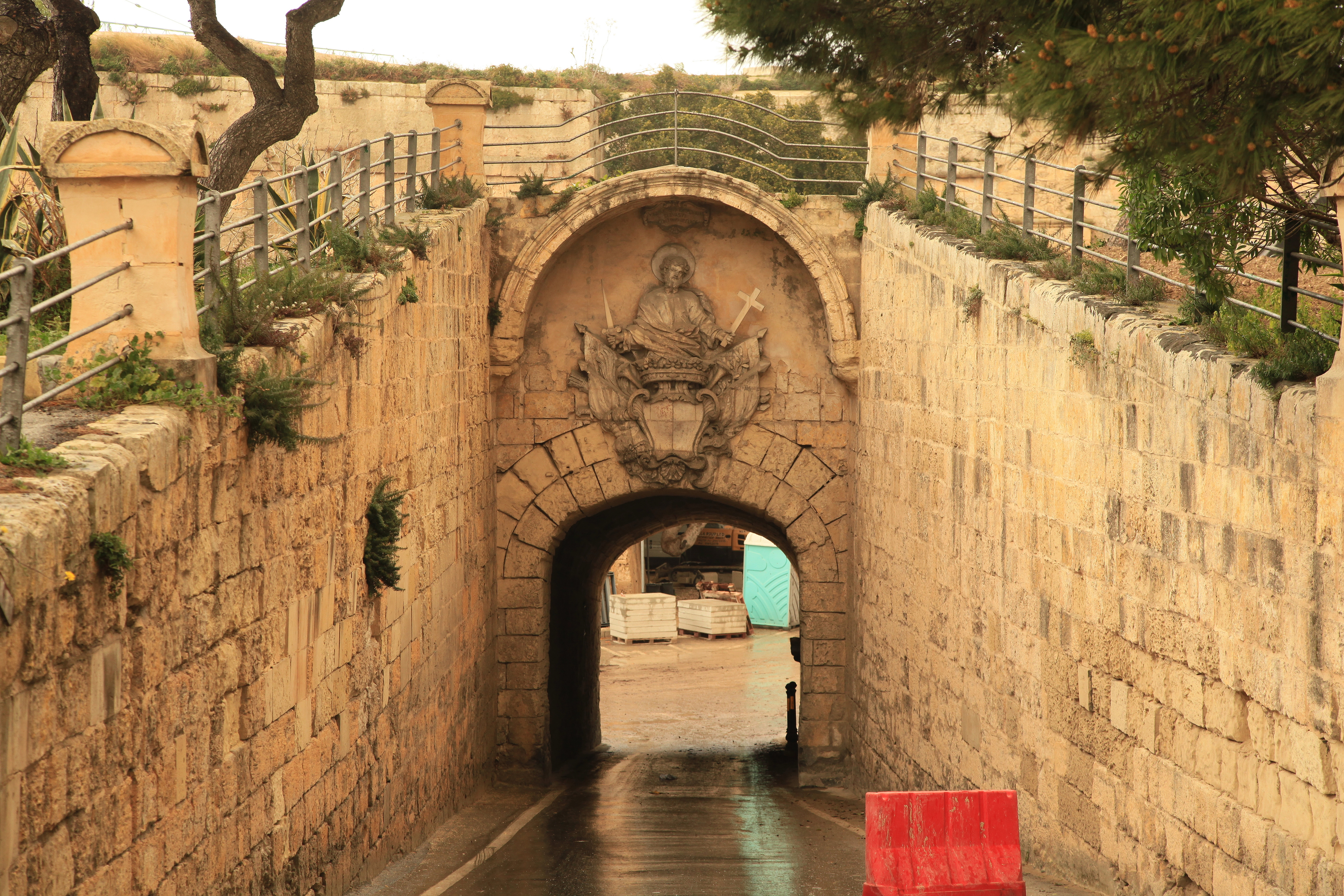
Outer Greeks Gate

The gate is approached through a pas-de-souris which is sometimes referred to as the Outer Greeks Gate. This was originally protected by a re-entrant place-of-arms, and was linked to the gate by a caponier. Today, the pas-de-souris provides vehicular access into the Mdina ditch, while the place-of-arms and caponier no longer exist. The gate was protected by a wooden à la Vauban drawbridge and a drop ditch, but the latter has been filled in. The underground chamber in which the drawbridge was retracted still exists. The gate still retains its wooden door in situ.

== See also ==
- Mdina Gate
