= Mdina Gate =

- Il-Bieb tal-Imdina
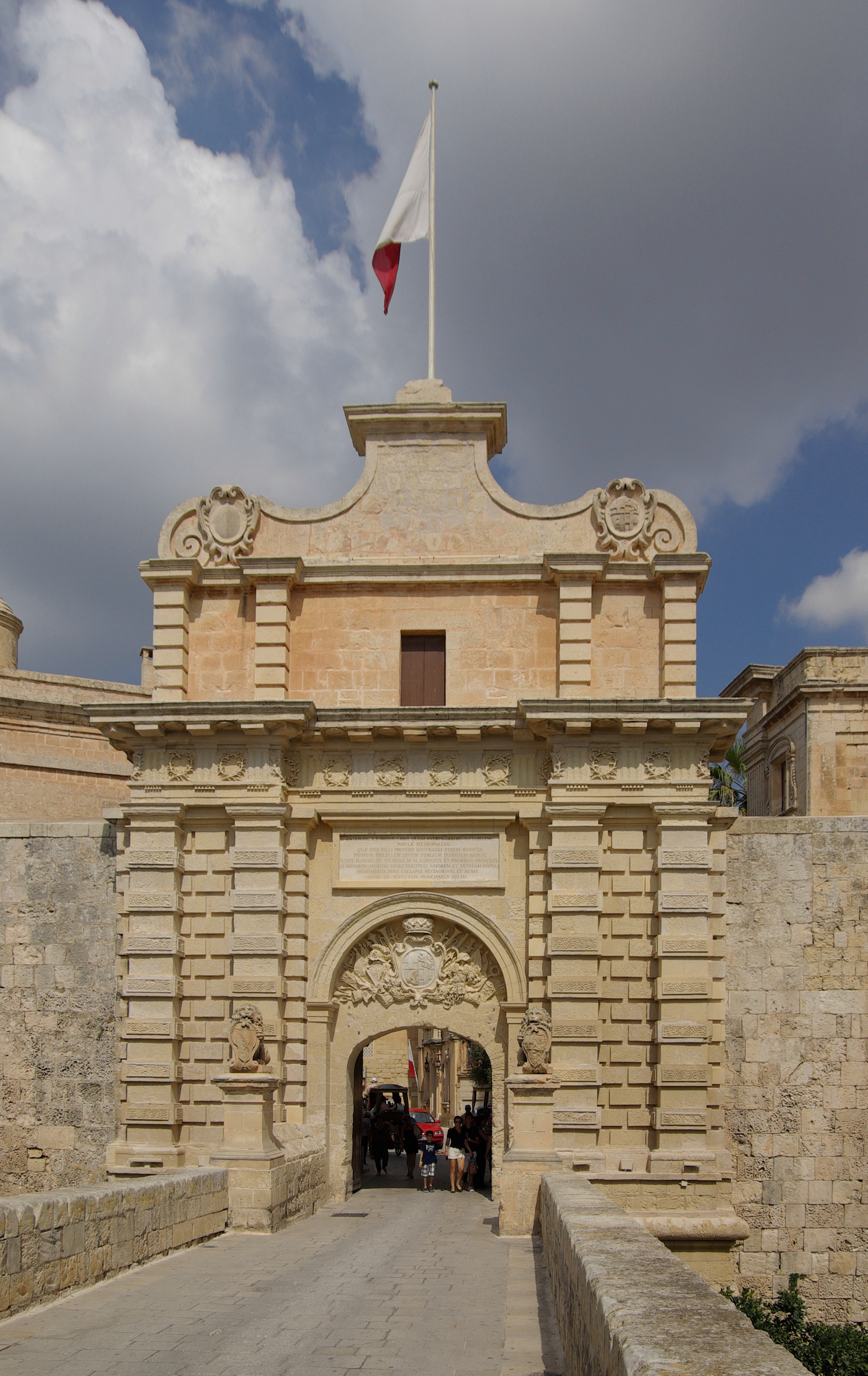
- View of the Mdina Gate
- Interactive map of the Mdina Gate area
- Alternative names: Main Gate; Vilhena Gate

General information
- Status: Intact
- Type: City gate
- Architectural style: Baroque
- Location: Mdina, Malta
- Coordinates: 35°53′5″N 14°24′12.4″E
- Completed: 1724
- Owner: Government of Malta

Technical details
- Material: Limestone

Design and construction
- Architect: Charles François de Mondion

Mdina Gate (Maltese: Il-Bieb tal-Imdina), also known as the Main Gate or the Vilhena Gate, is the main gate into the fortified city of Mdina, Malta. It was built in the Baroque style in 1724 to designs of Charles François de Mondion, during the magistracy of Grand Master António Manoel de Vilhena.

== History ==
The city of Maleth was founded by the Phoenicians in around 700 BC, and it later became part of the Roman Empire under the name Melite. The Punic-Roman city occupied all of present-day Mdina, and its walls also extended into part of Rabat. The city was reduced to its present size sometime during the early medieval period, either by the Byzantines or the Arabs. By the 15th century, the city (now known as Mdina) was defended by a system of double walls on the land front, with the main entrance being located close to the southeast corner of the city, near a tower known as the Turri Mastra.

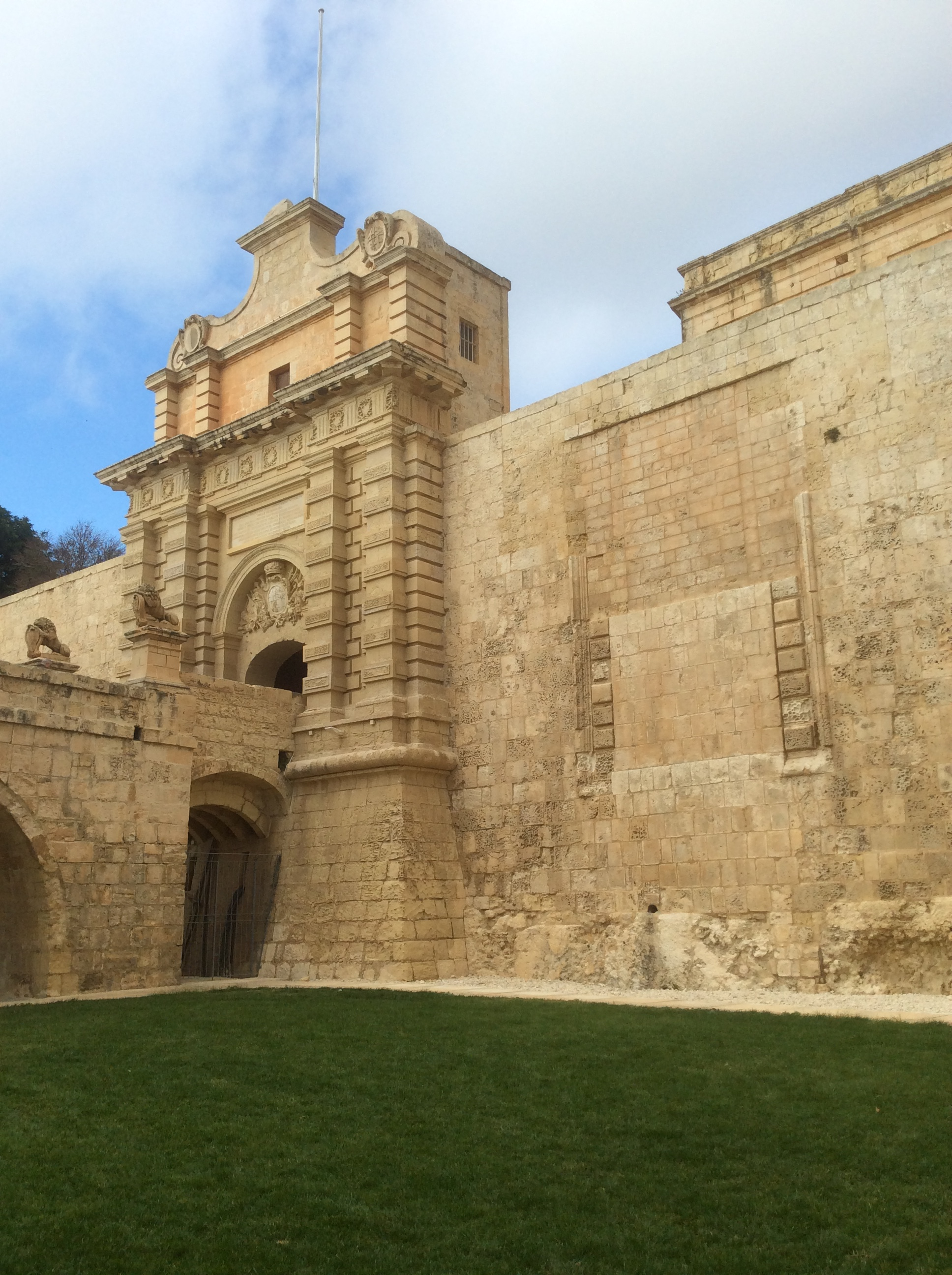
Mdina Gate and the walled up medieval entrance

In the medieval period, the main entrance to Mdina consisted of three gates which were separated by courtyards. The outer gate was called the Prima Porta Principale or the Porta di Santa Maria, and it was decorated with the coat of arms of Sua Cesarea Majestati in 1527. A barbican was built to protect the gate sometime after 1448, but it was demolished in 1551 since it was no longer regarded as being suitable for defence. It is believed that this gate was reconstructed by the Order of St. John in the early 17th century.

In 1722, Grand Master António Manoel de Vilhena issued orders for the restoration and renovation of Mdina. The city entrance was completely rebuilt, and a new Baroque gate was built to designs of the French architect Charles François de Mondion in 1724. Since the courtyards behind the old gate were demolished to make way for the Palazzo Vilhena, the original gate was walled up and the new one was built a couple of metres to its left. The city's medieval fortifications were also rebuilt at this point, and the Turri Mastra was demolished and replaced by the Torre dello Standardo.

The Mdina Gate was depicted on a £M 2 commemorative silver coin minted by the Central Bank of Malta in 1973. The rear of the gate, along with the Torre dello Standardo, was depicted on the Lm 5 banknote that was in circulation between 1989 and 2007.

The gate was restored in 2008 by the Restoration Unit of the Works Department.

Today, the Mdina Gate is one of the main tourist attractions of Mdina. The gate was included on the Antiquities List of 1925. It is now scheduled as a Grade 1 national monument, and it is also listed on the National Inventory of the Cultural Property of the Maltese Islands.

== Architecture ==
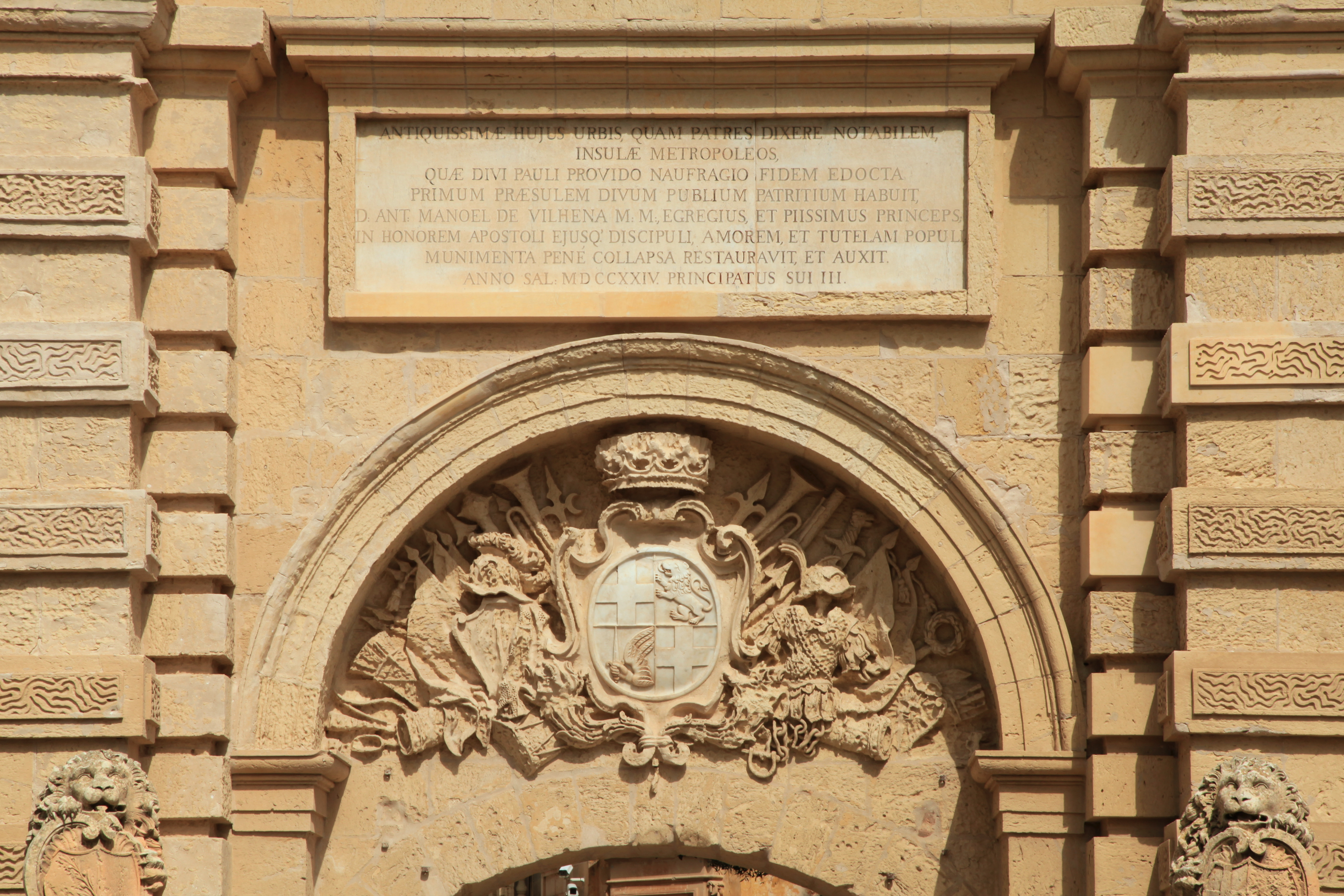
Inscription and Vilhena's coat of arms

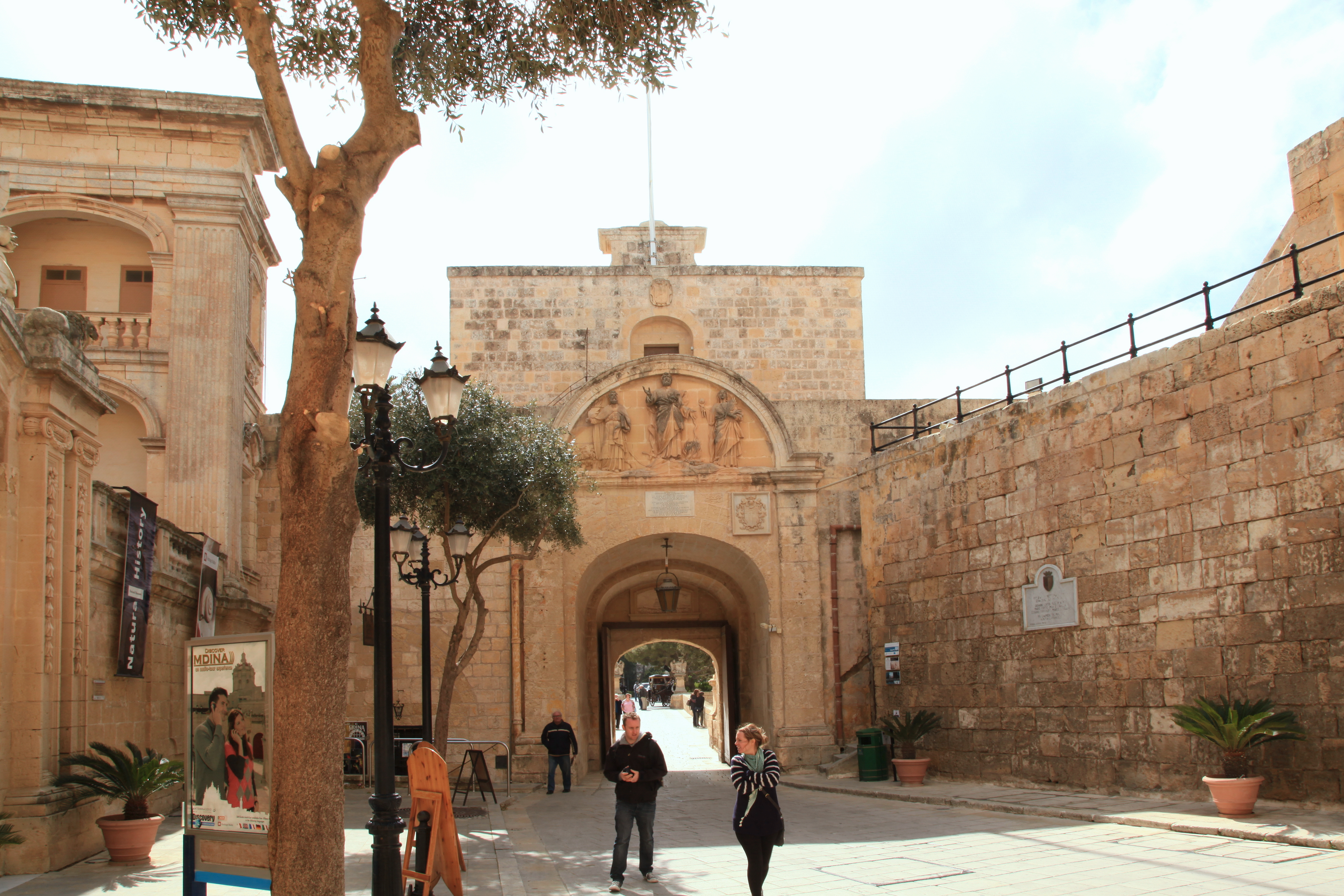
Rear of the gate

The Mdina Gate consists of a Baroque portal and a superstructure serving as a gatehouse. The portal is decorated with double pilasters, the coats of arms of Grand Master António Manoel de Vilhena and the city of Mdina, a trophy of arms and a Latin inscription reading:

ANTIQUISSIMÆ HUJUS URBIS, QUAM PATRES DIXERE NOTABILEM,
INSULÆ METROPOLEOS,
QUÆ DIVI PAULI PROVIDO NAUFRAGIO FIDEM EDOCTA
PRIMUM PRÆSULEM DIVUM PUBLIUM PATRITIUM HABUIT,
D: ANT: MANOEL DE VILHENA M: M:, EGREGIUS, ET PIISSIMUS PRINCEPS;
IN HONOREM APOSTOLI EJUSQ.' DISCIPULI, AMOREM, ET TUTELAM POPULI;
MUNIMENTA PENÉ COLLAPSA RESTAURAVIT, ET AUXIT.
ANNO SAL: MDCCXXIV. PRINCIPATUS SUI III.

The rear of the gate is decorated with reliefs of St. Publius, St. Agatha and St. Paul, who are the patron saints of Malta.

An arched stone bridge, which is decorated by statues of lions holding the coat of arms of Vilhena or the town of Rabat, leads to the gate. A wooden à la Vauban drawbridge originally linked the bridge to the gate.

== In popular culture ==
The Mdina Gate represented one of the gates of King's Landing in the filming of Lord Snow, the third episode of the first season of Game of Thrones.

== See also ==
- Greeks Gate
