= Charles François de Mondion =

French architect and military engineer (1681–1733)

- Born: 6 October 1681; Paris, France
- Died: 25 December 1733 (aged 52); Hospitaller Malta
- Resting place: Chapel of St Anthony, Fort Manoel; 35°54′11.4″N 14°30′18.4″E
- Occupations: Architect and military engineer
- Notable work: Various buildings in Mdina, and several fortifications in the Maltese Islands
- Style: Baroque

Charles François de Mondion (6 October 1681 – 25 December 1733) was a French architect and military engineer who was active in Hospitaller Malta in the early 18th century. He was also a member of the Order of Saint John.

== Career ==
Mondion was born in Paris, and he studied military engineering under Sébastien Le Prestre de Vauban. He first arrived in Malta in 1715 during the magistracy of Grand Master Ramon Perellos y Roccaful of the Order of St. John. His early work was as deputy to the military engineer René Jacob de Tigné. One of his early works was the second Marsalforn Tower, which however no longer exists.

Mondion was eventually admitted into the Order of St. John as a Cavaliere di Grazia, and he obtained permanent residency in Malta.

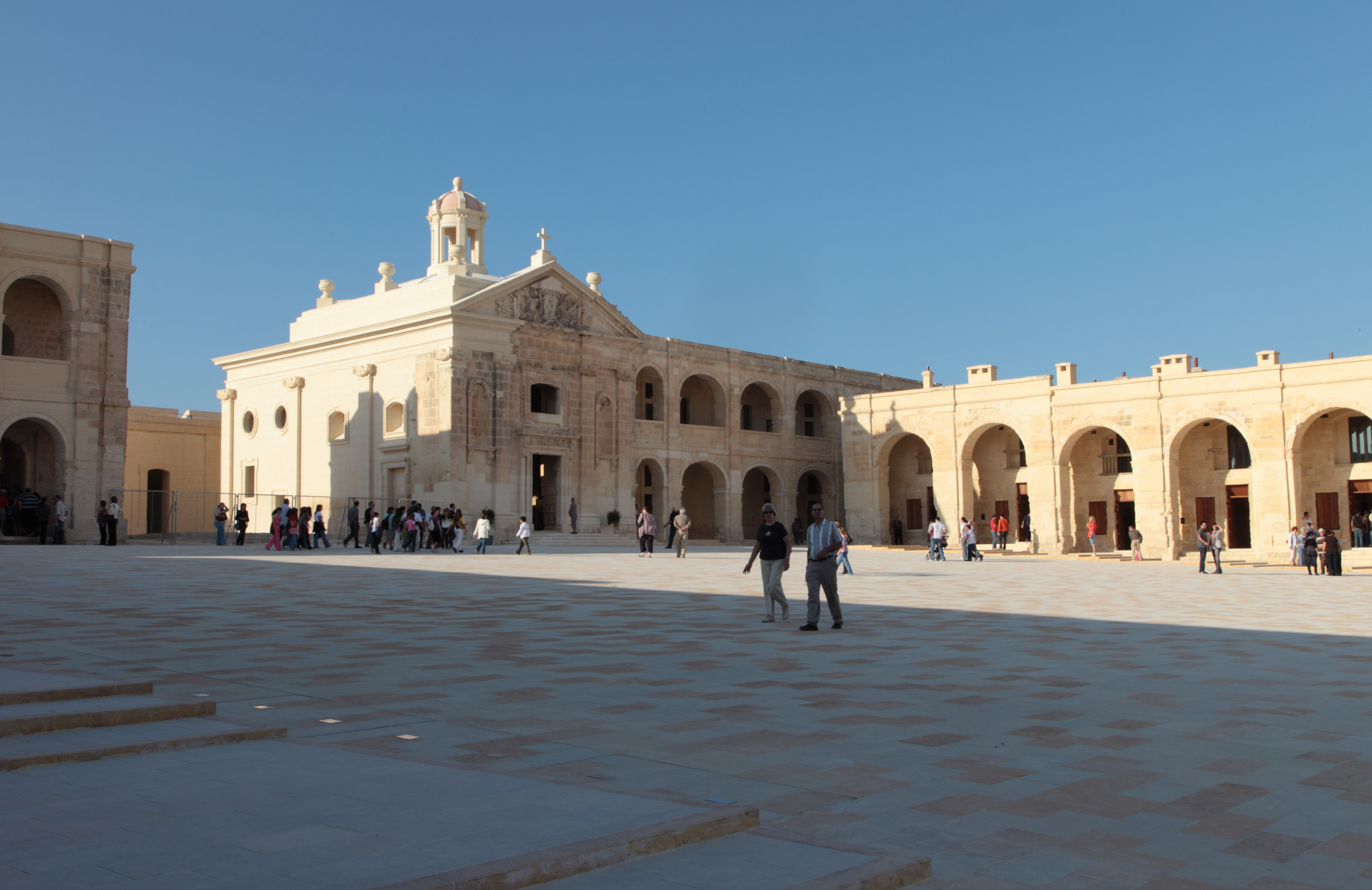
Mondion is buried in the crypt of the Chapel of St. Anthony of Padua in Fort Manoel

Grand Master António Manoel de Vilhena's accession in June 1722 created a significant opportunity for Mondion, as the new Prince of Malta decided to unleash an ambitious building programme. On 3 November 1722, Vilhena issued orders for the restoration of the former capital Mdina and its fortifications, and entrusted de Mondion with this renovation. Mondion designed a number of Baroque buildings in the city, including the Main Gate, the portal of Greeks Gate, the Torre dello Standardo, Palazzo Vilhena, the Banca Giuratale and the Corte Capitanale.

Mondion was also involved in the construction or modifications of the Floriana Lines, Fort Manoel, the fortifications of Birgu and the Santa Margherita Lines. He designed several gates within these fortifications, including Porte des Bombes and St. Helen's Gate.

His unexpected death in 1733 cut short a promising career. Mondion was buried in the crypt of the Chapel of St Anthony of Padua within Fort Manoel.

== Gallery ==
Buildings designed by Mondion
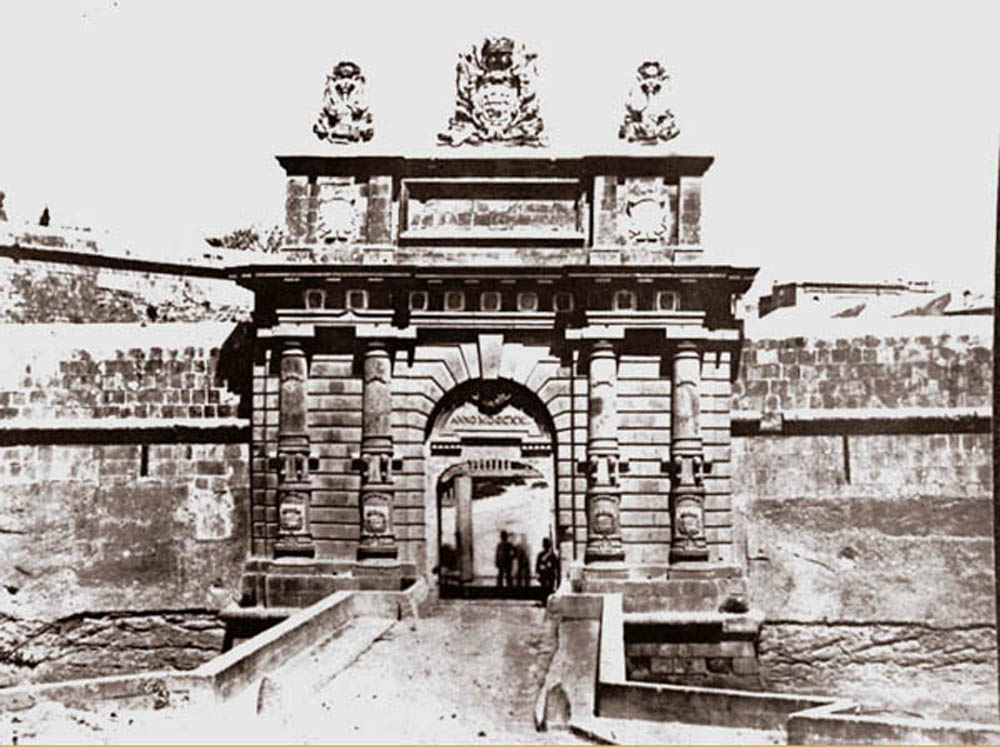
Porte des Bombes (1720–21)

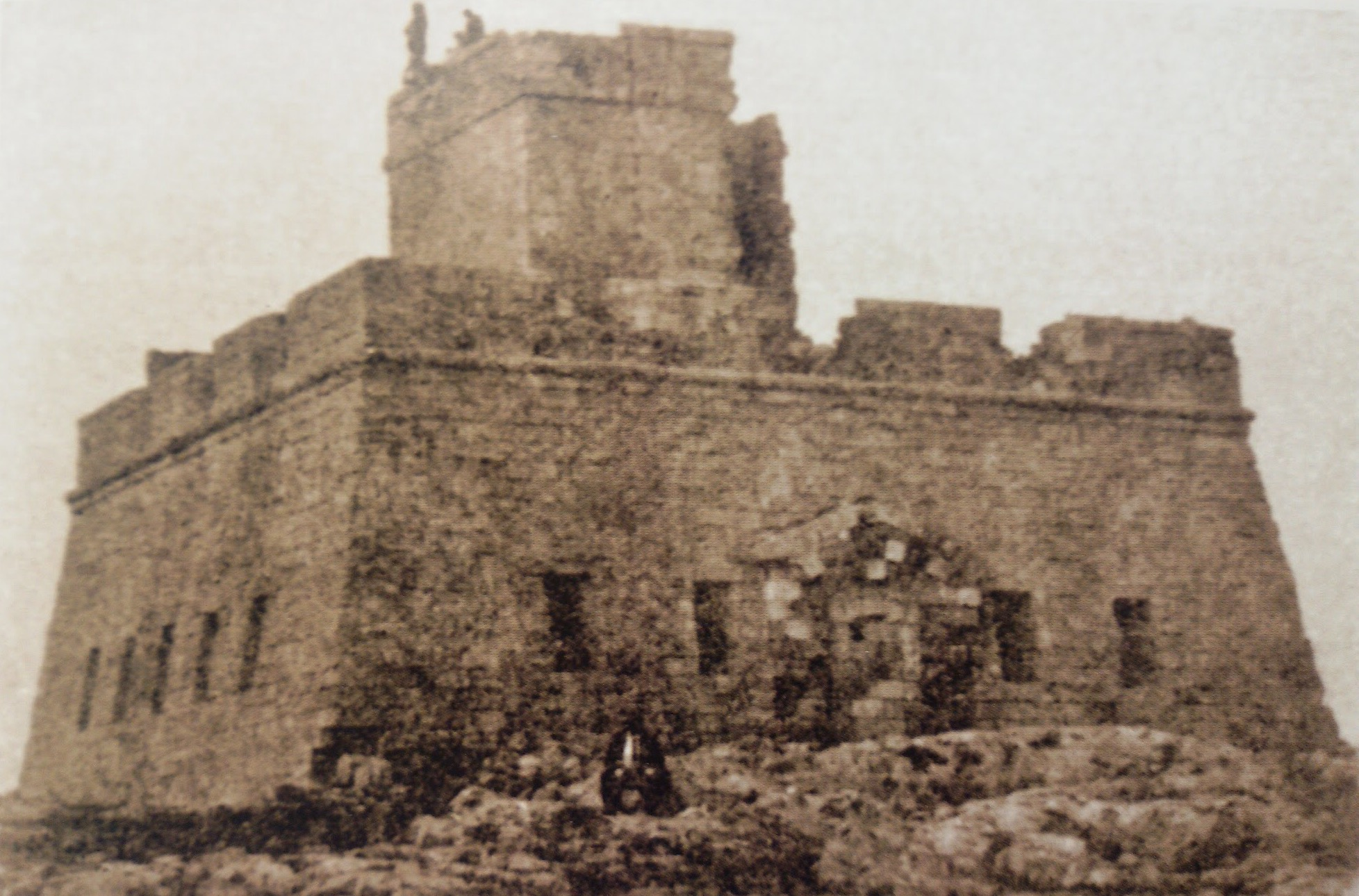
Marsalforn Tower (1720–22)

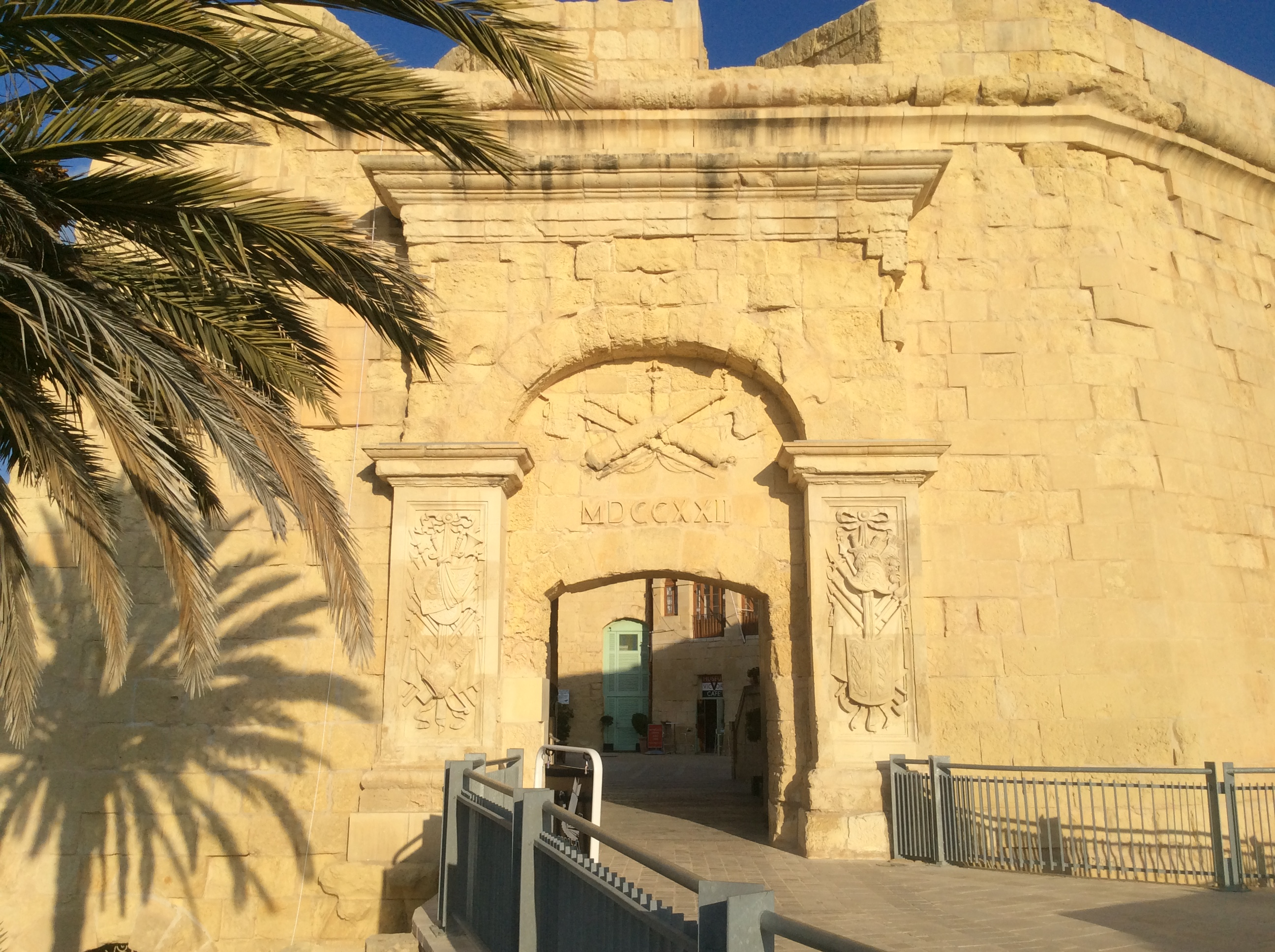
Couvre Porte Gate (1722)

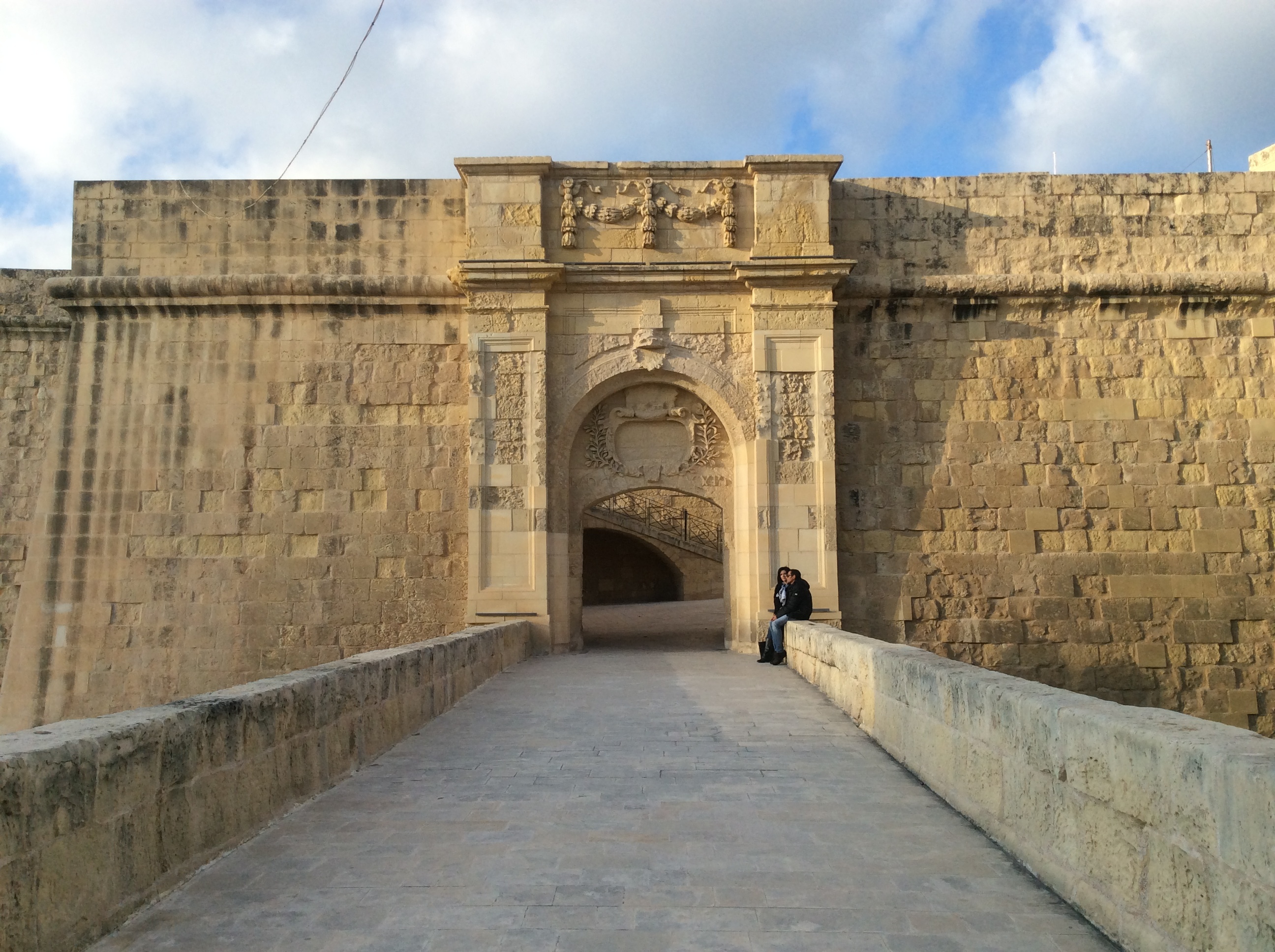
Advanced Gate (1723)

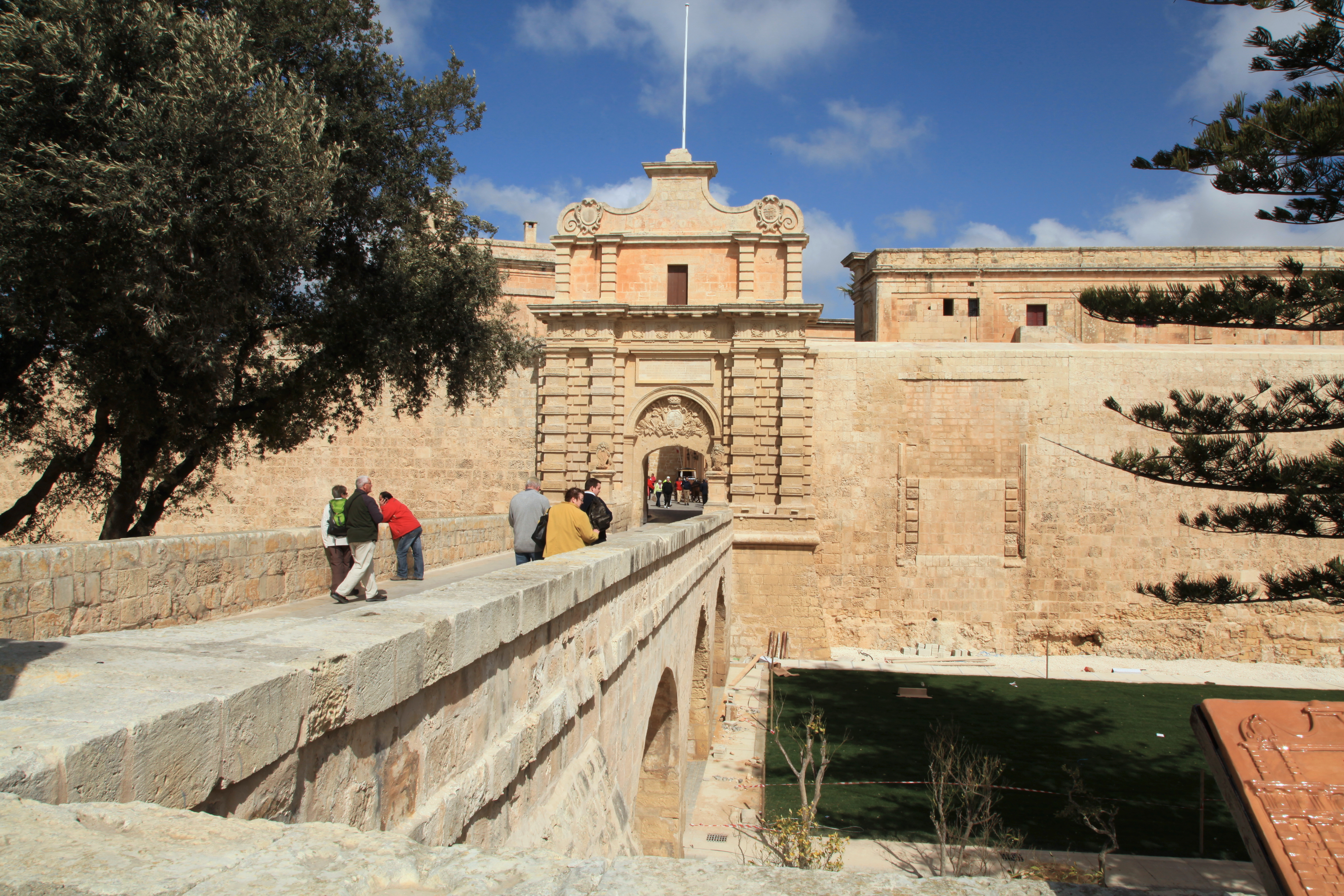
Mdina Gate (1724)

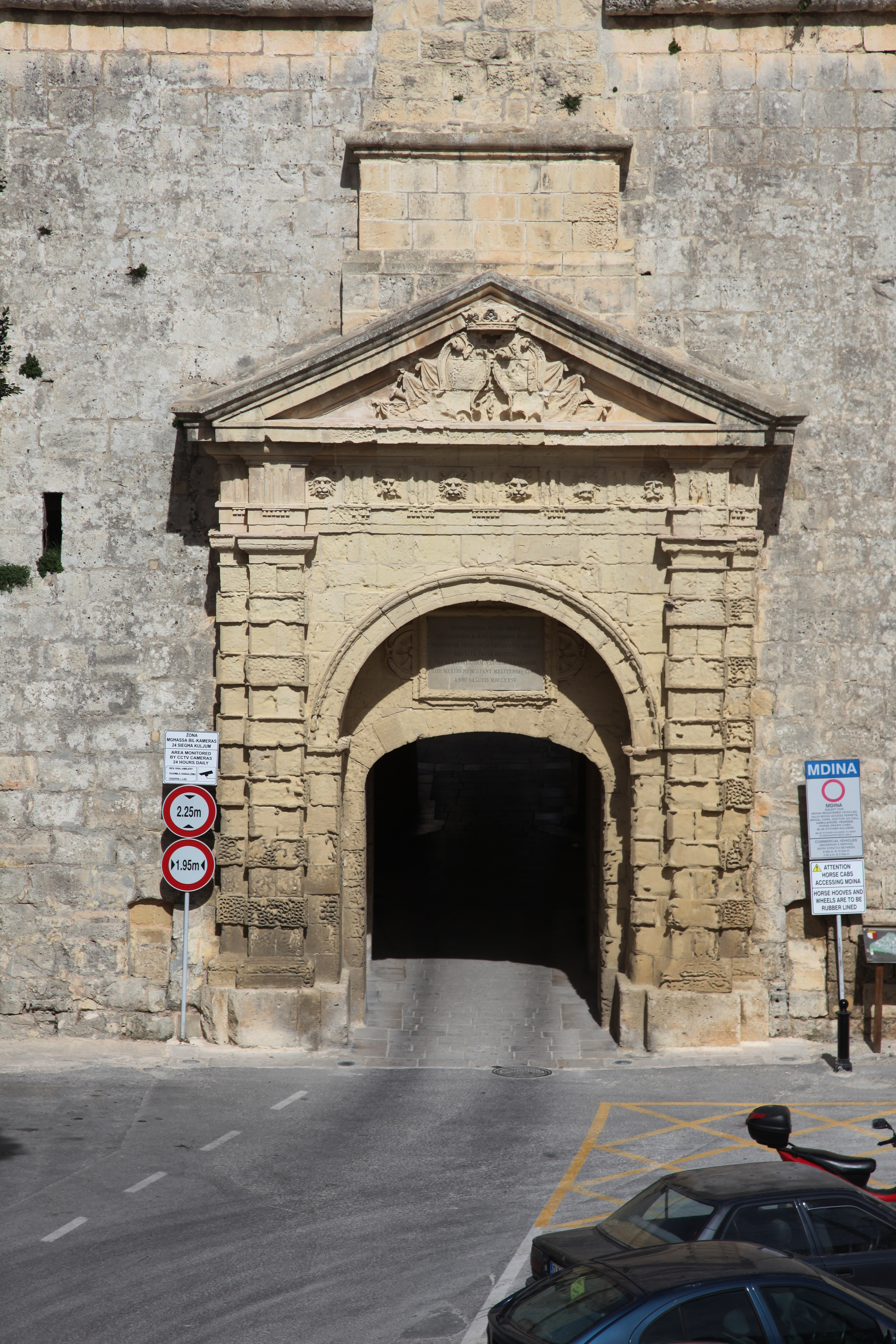
Portal of Greeks Gate (1724)

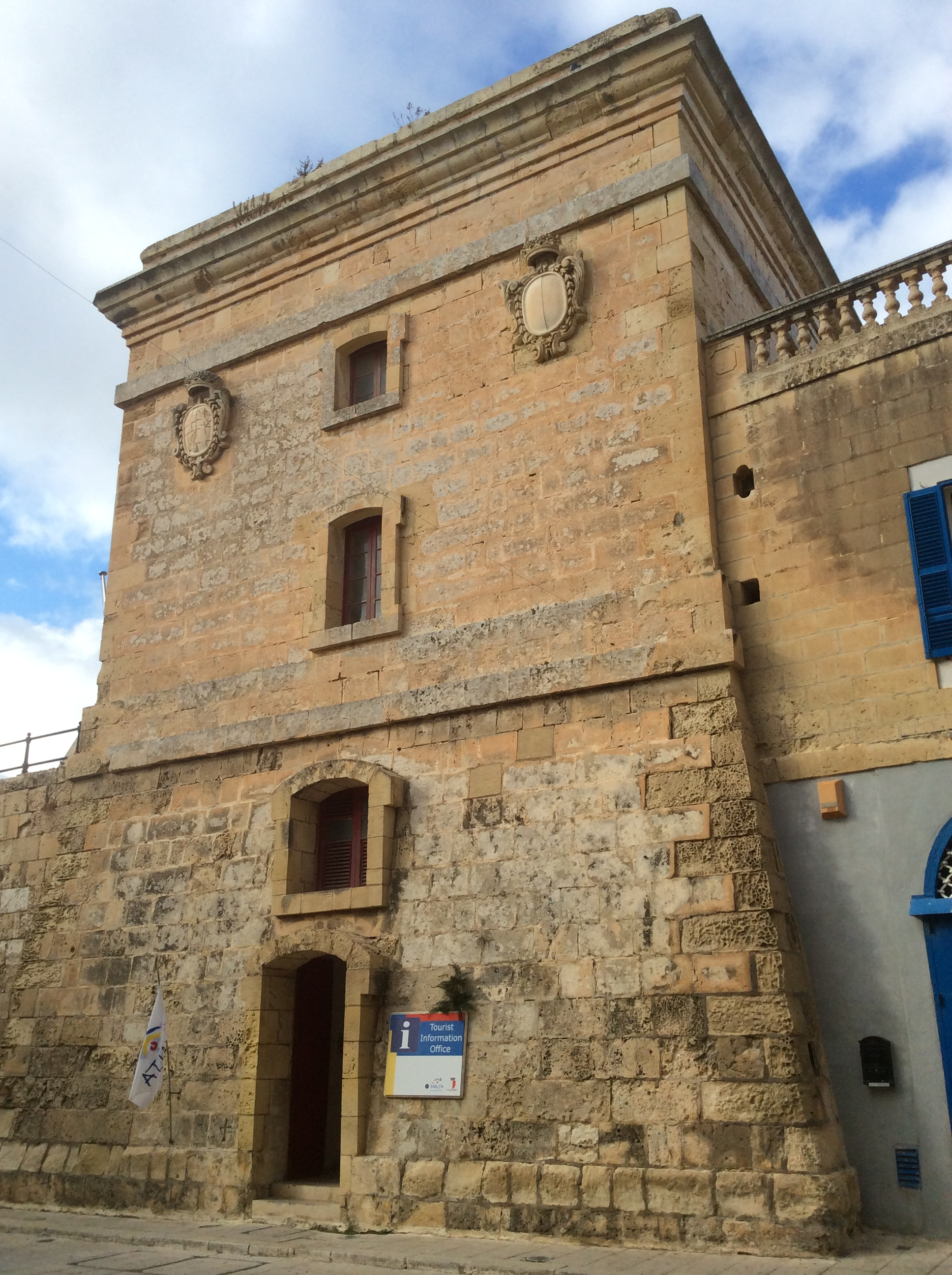
Torre dello Standardo (1725)

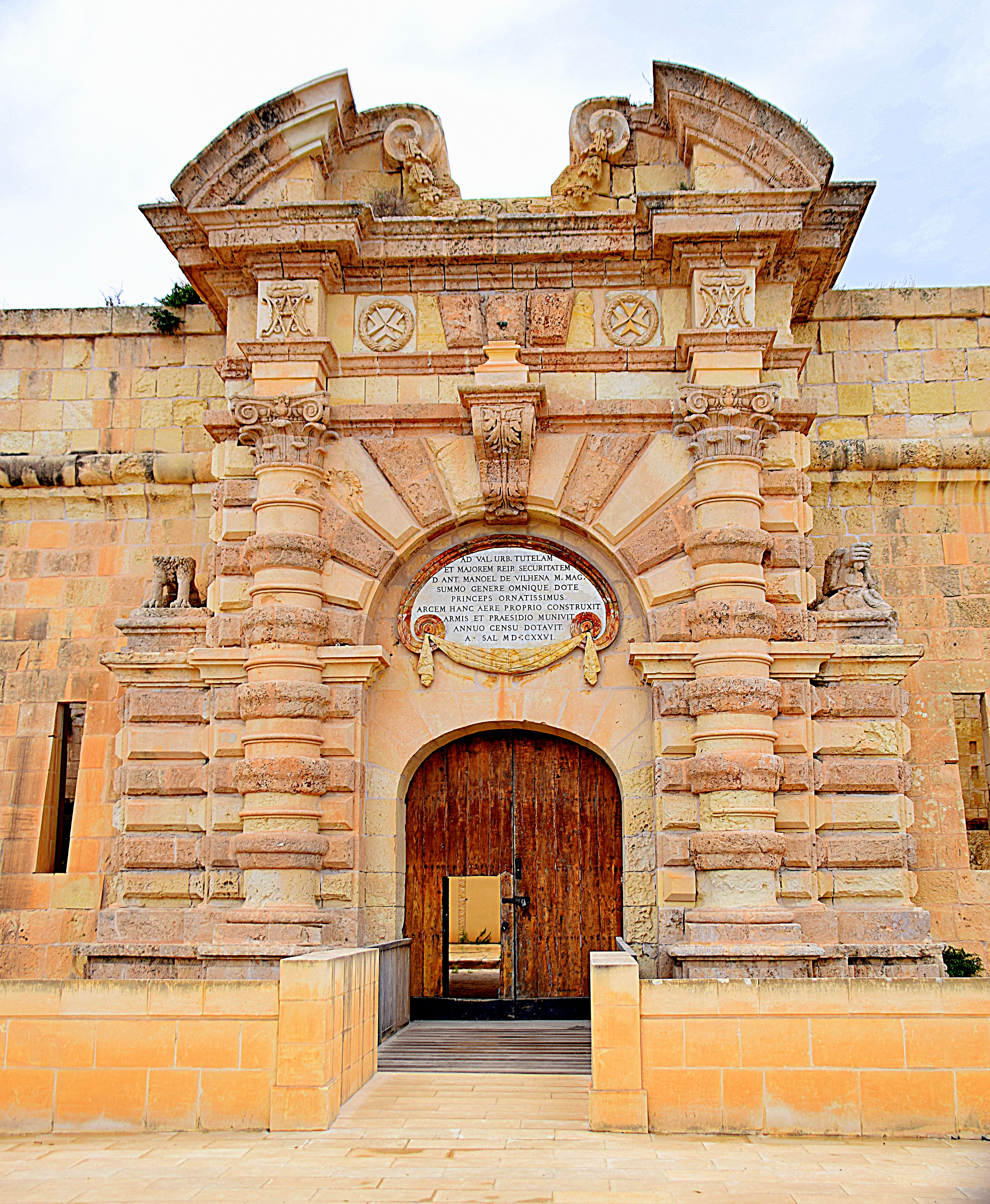
Fort Manoel Gate (1726)

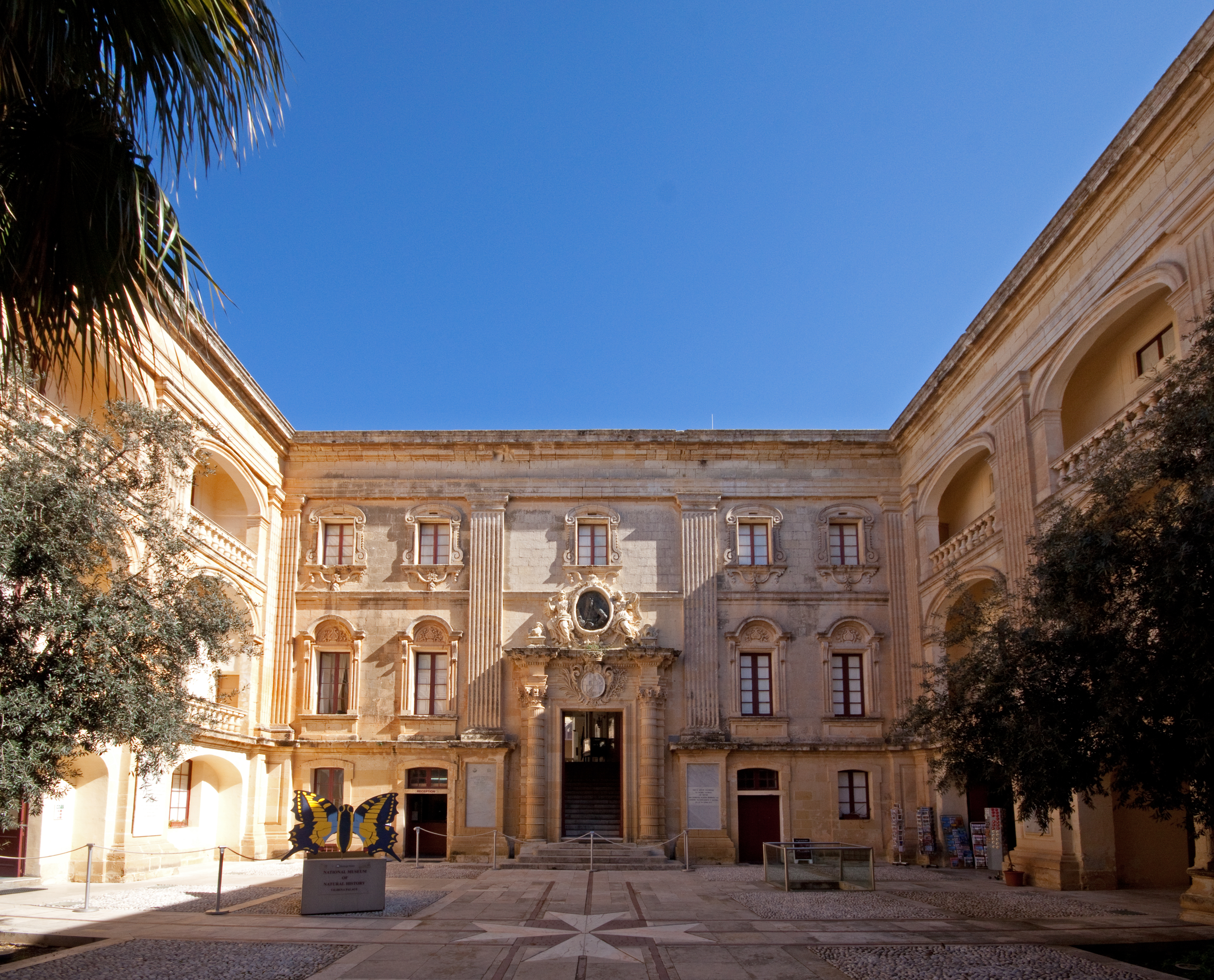
Palazzo Vilhena (1726–28)

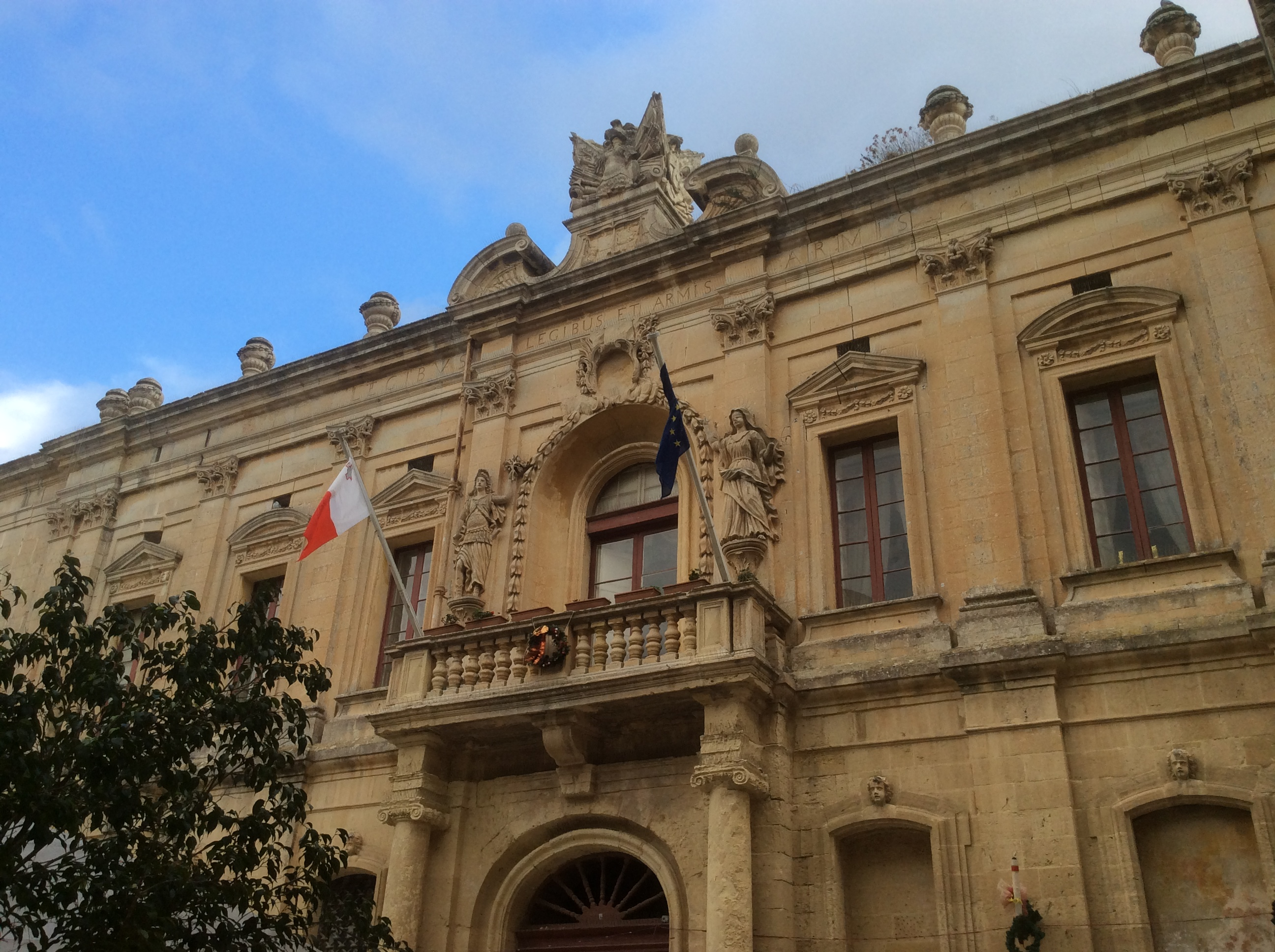
Corte Capitanale (1726–28)

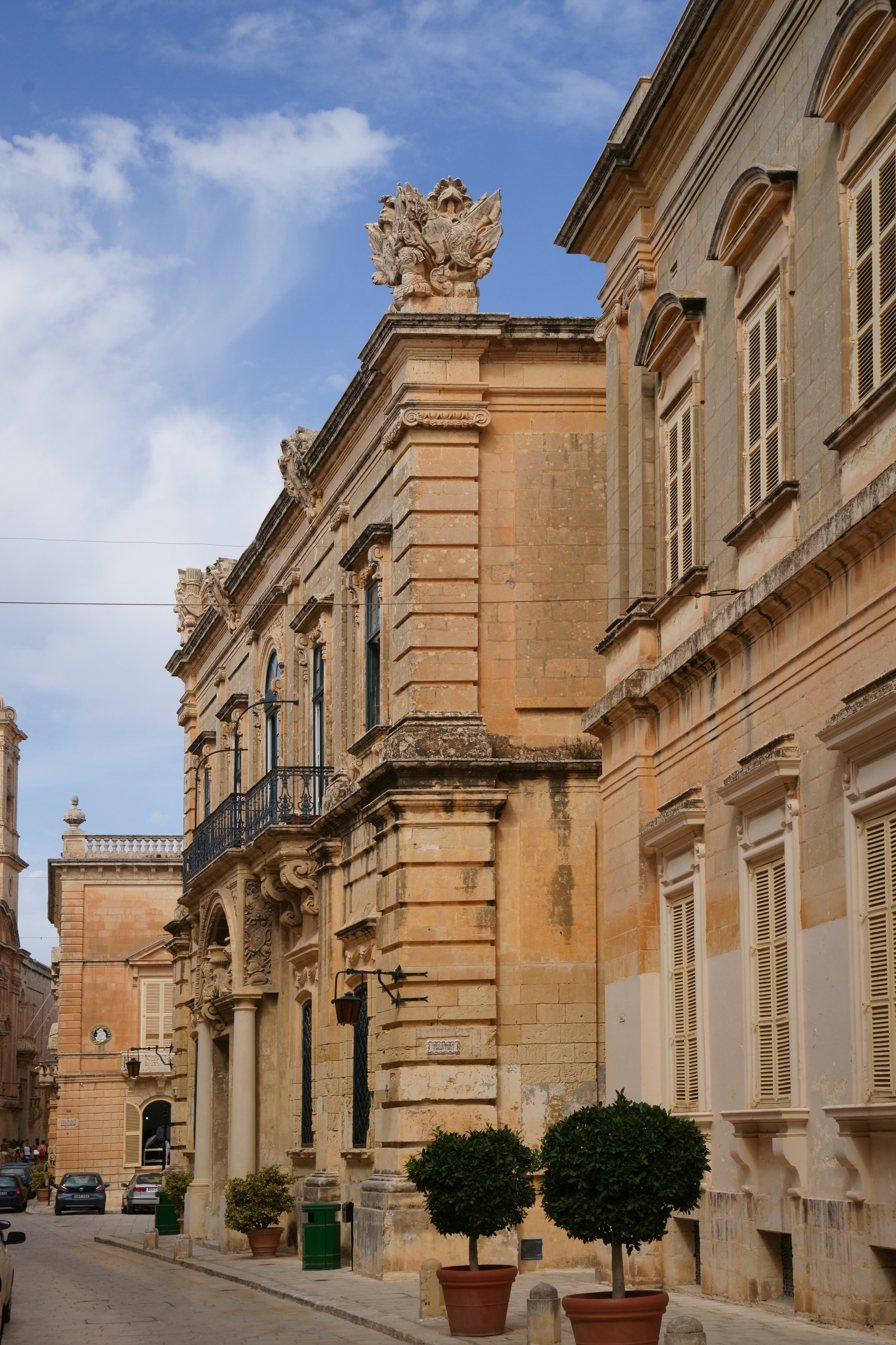
Banca Giuratale (1726–28)

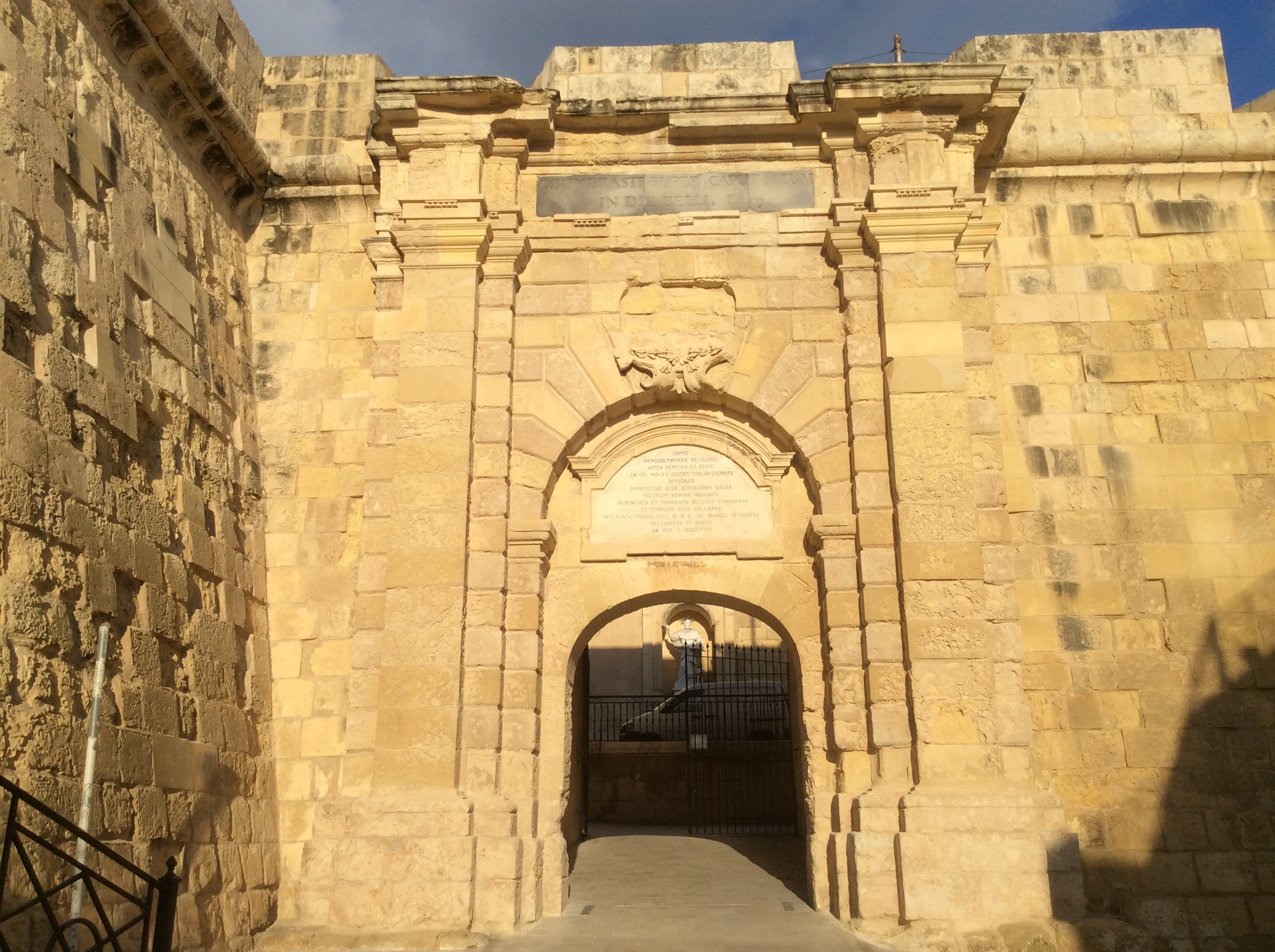
Gate of Provence (1727)

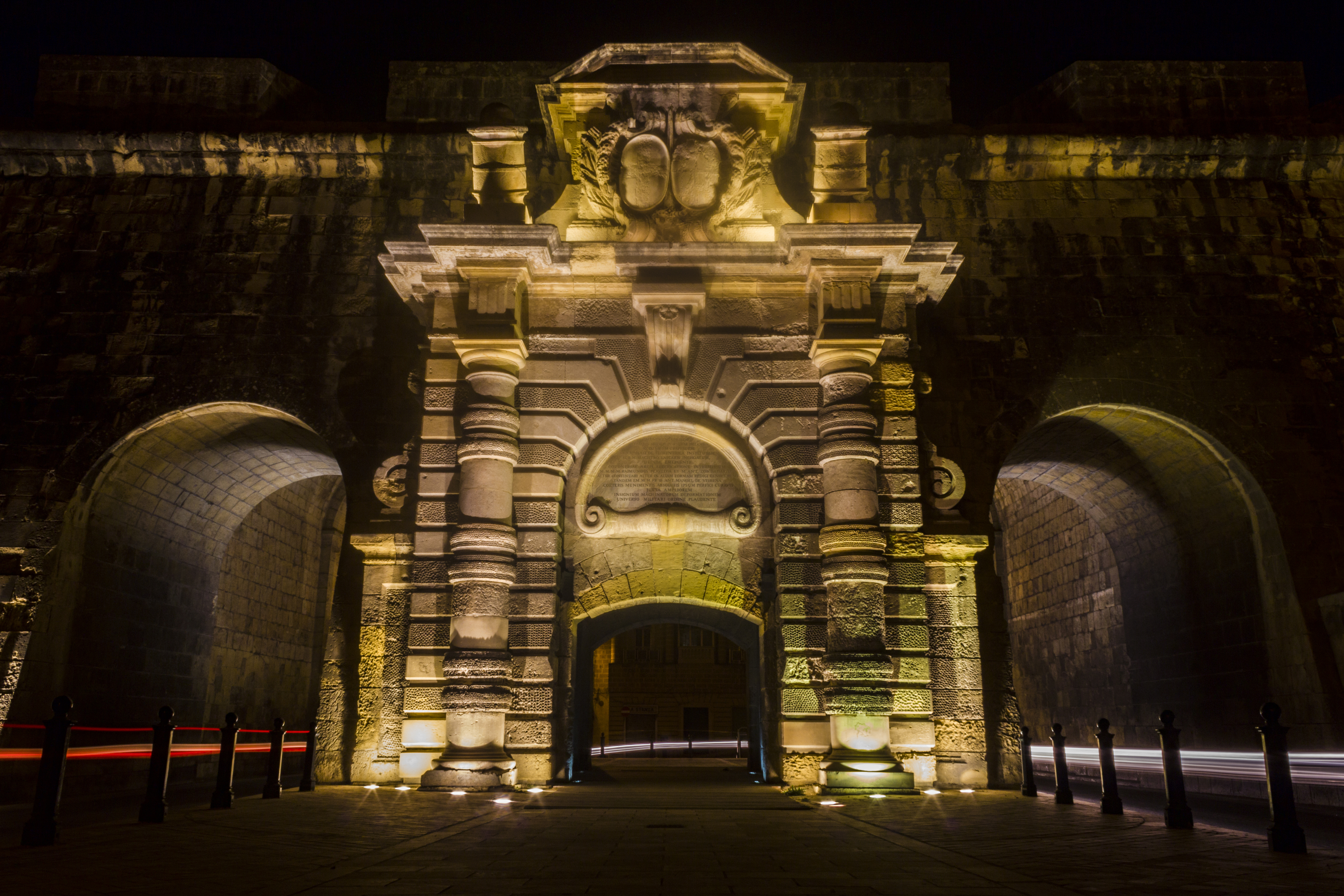
St. Helen's Gate (1736)
