= Vilhena Palace =

French Baroque palace in Mdina, Malta

- Il-Palazz De Vilhena
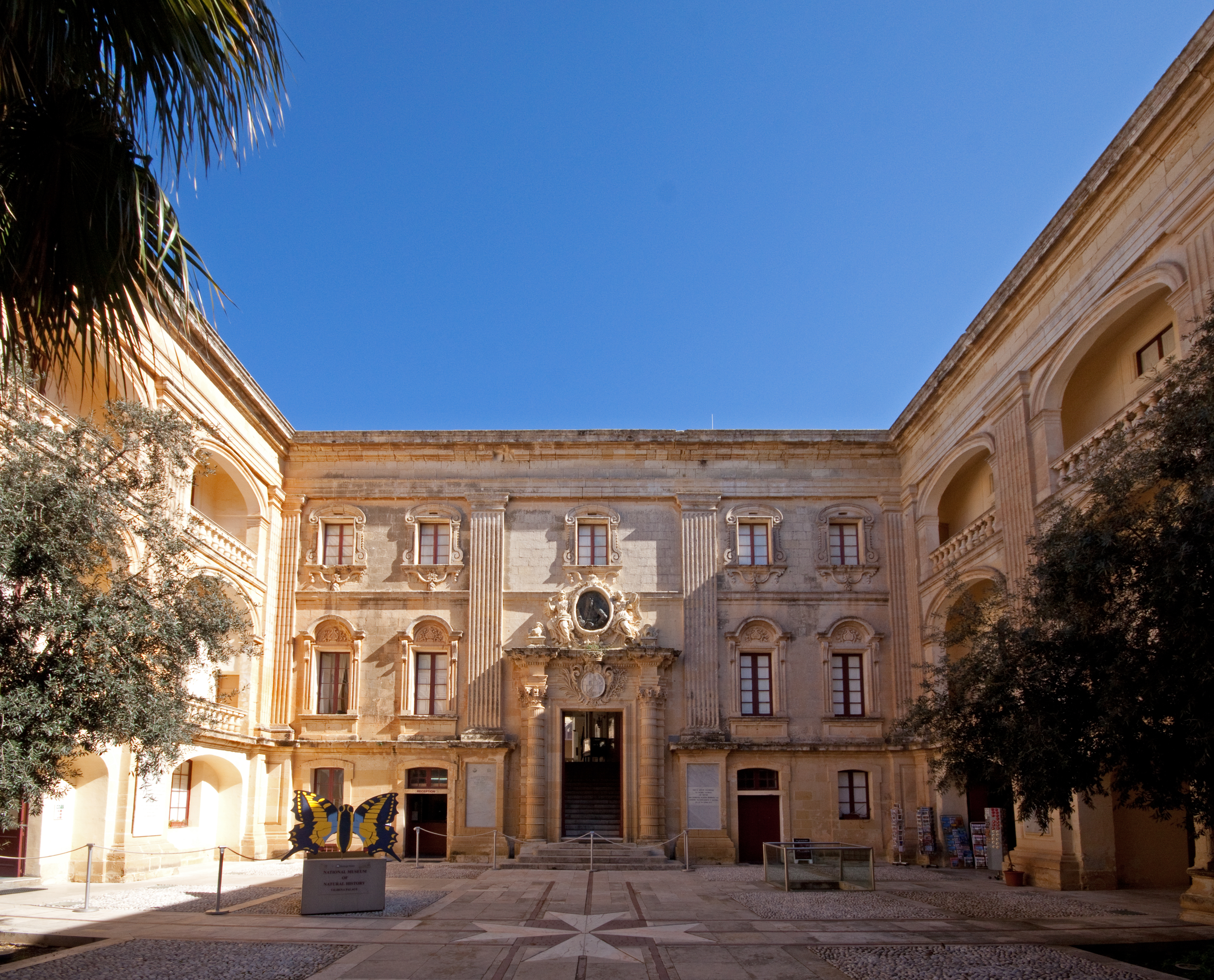
- Forecourt of Vilhena Palace
- Interactive map of the Vilhena Palace area
- Former names: Connaught Hospital
- Alternative names: Palazzo Vilhena; Magisterial Palace; Palazzo Pretorio

General information
- Status: Intact
- Type: Palace
- Architectural style: French Baroque
- Location: Mdina, Malta
- Coordinates: 35°53′5.3″N 14°24′14″E
- Named for: António Manoel de Vilhena
- Construction started: 1726
- Completed: 1728
- Owner: Government of Malta

Technical details
- Material: Limestone

Design and construction
- Architect: Charles François de Mondion

Website
- Heritage Malta

Vilhena Palace (Maltese: Il-Palazz De Vilhena; Italian: Palazzo Vilhena), also known as the Magisterial Palace (Maltese: Palazz Maġisterjali) and Palazzo Pretorio, is a French Baroque palace in Mdina, Malta. It is named after António Manoel de Vilhena, the Grand Master who commissioned it. It was built between 1726 and 1728 to designs of the French architect Charles François de Mondion, on the site of the meeting place of the Università. The palace was used a hospital in the 19th and 20th centuries, and it became known as Connaught Hospital after 1909. Since 1973, it has been open to the public as Malta's National Museum of Natural History.

== History ==
=== Background and construction ===
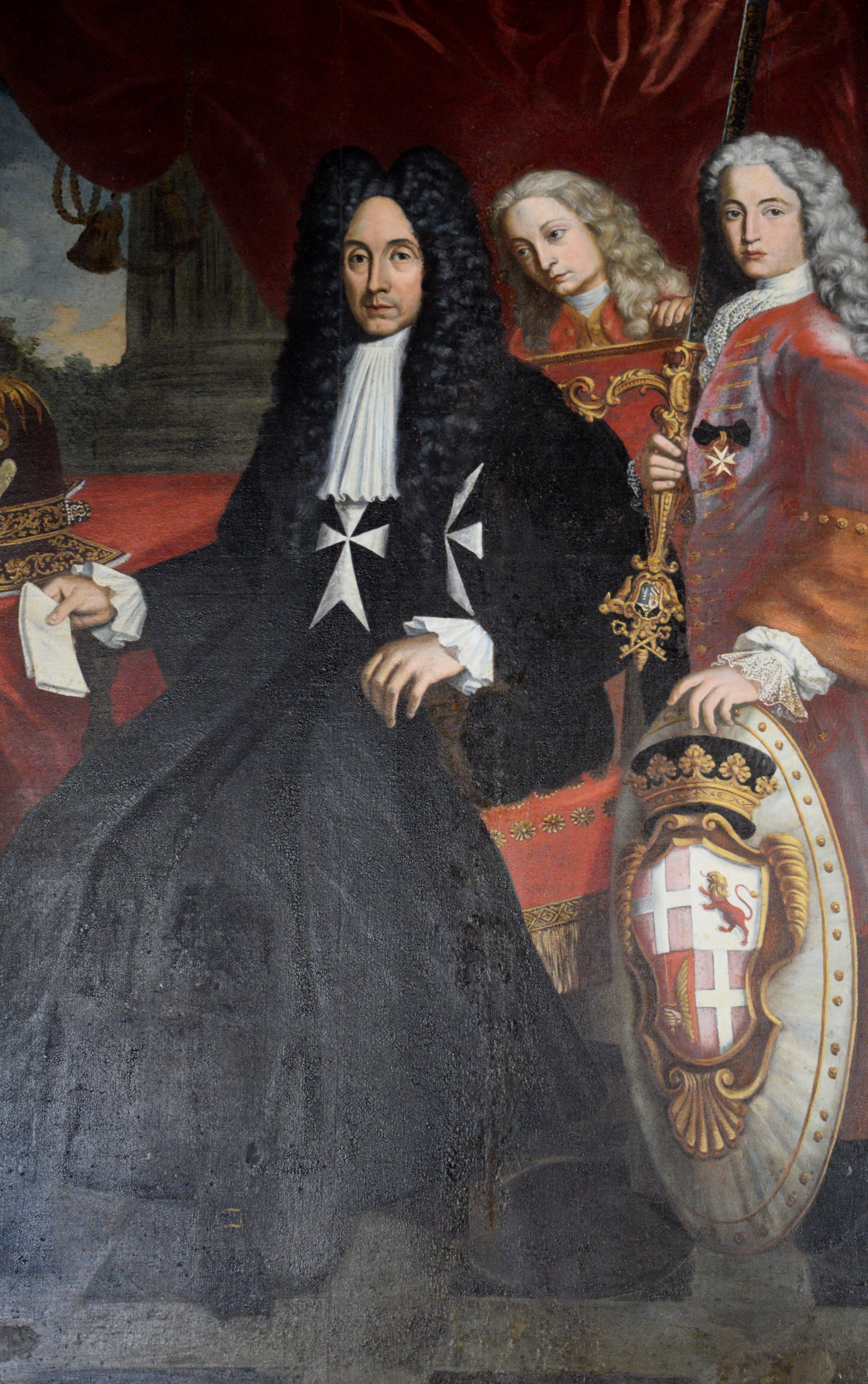
The palace was built, and named after, António Manoel de Vilhena, a Portuguese nobleman who was elected Grand Master in 1722.

The site of Vilhena Palace has been inhabited since ancient times, and post-Punic remains have been found in the area. In around the 8th century, a Byzantine fort was probably built on the site, and in the Middle Ages it developed into a castle known as the Castellu di la Chitati. The castle's inner walls were demolished in the 15th century, and the remaining part was built up as a palace by Grand Master Philippe Villiers de L'Isle-Adam in the 1530s. The palace was called the Palazzo Giuratale, and it housed the civil administrative council known as the Università. The structure was damaged in the 1693 Sicily earthquake.

On 3 November 1722, the newly elected Grand Master, António Manoel de Vilhena, issued orders for the restoration and renovation of Mdina. The city entrance was completely rebuilt, and the seat of the Università was demolished to make way for a summer palace for the Grand Master. A new Banca Giuratale was built to house the Università following the demolition of its meeting place.

Construction of Vilhena's new palace began in 1726, and it was completed two years later in 1728. The building was designed by Charles François de Mondion in the French Baroque style that was popular in Parisian hôtel palaces, and it was constructed under the supervision of the Maltese capomastro Petruzzo Debono.

=== Hospital ===
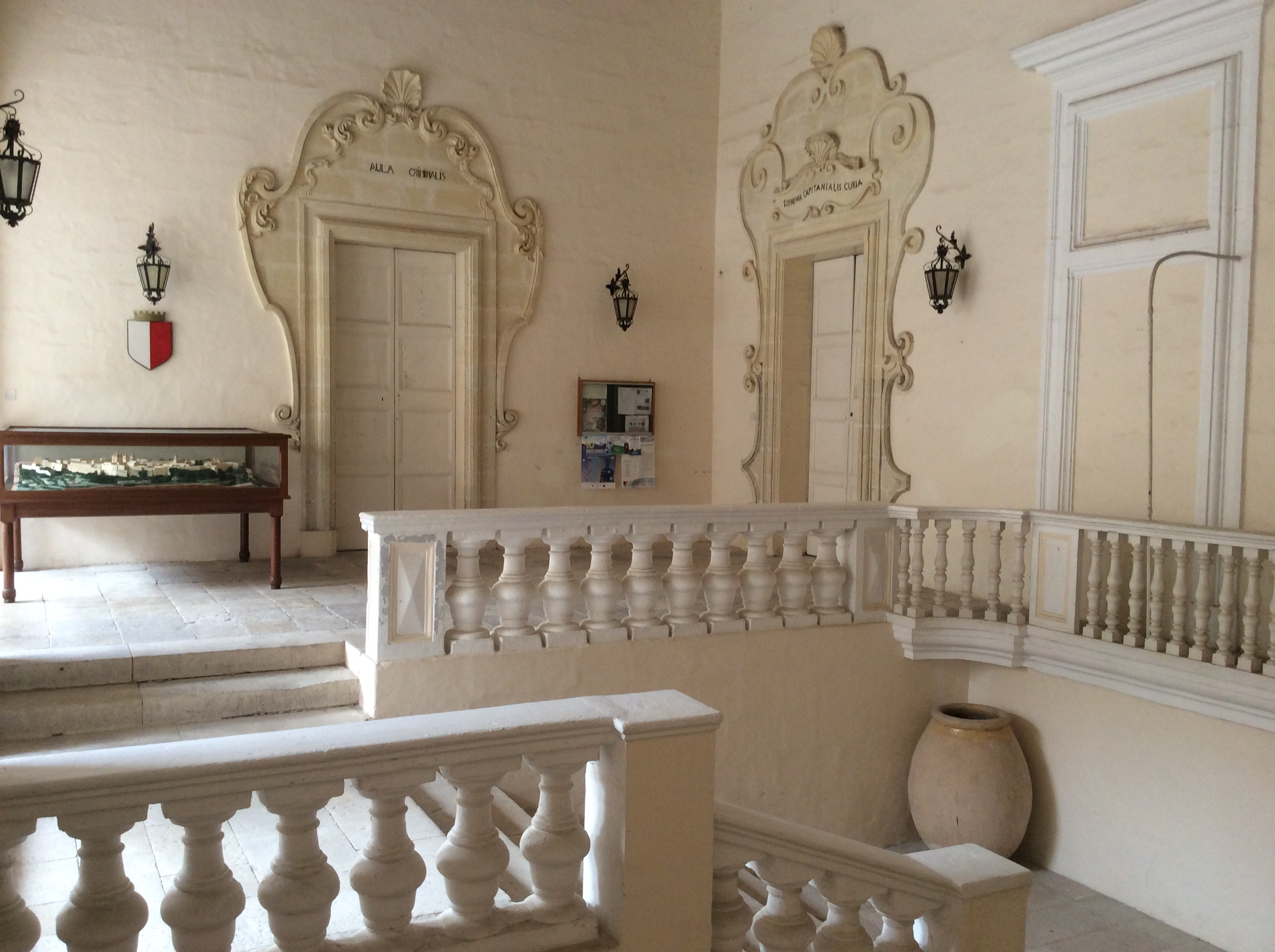
Interior of the palace

The palace served as a temporary hospital during a cholera outbreak in 1837.

On 12 June 1860, the palace was converted into a sanatorium by the British military. The palace was leased for £160 a year, and conversion of the building into a hospital cost less than £1000. The hospital was temporarily closed down in 1890, and it briefly served as a barracks. It reopened soon afterwards, and was finally closed down in 1907.

The palace was reopened by King Edward VII on 22 April 1909, as a hospital for patients suffering from tuberculosis. It was known as Connaught Hospital after Prince Arthur, Duke of Connaught and Strathearn, who donated £800 to buy new equipment for the hospital. The hospital was closed down in 1956.

=== Museum ===
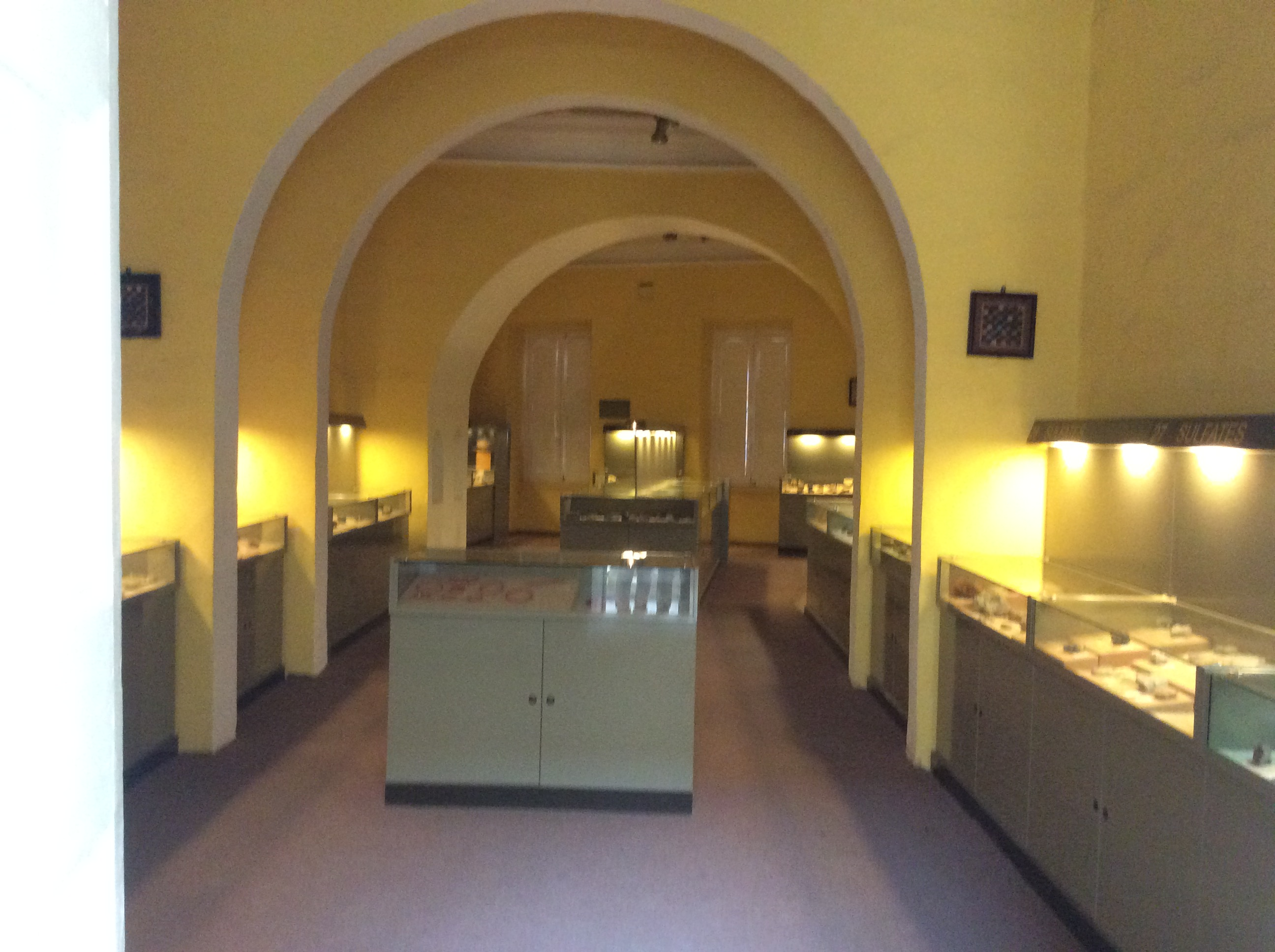
A section of the National Museum of Natural History

The palace was inaugurated as the National Museum of Natural History on 22 June 1973. Its collections include samples of flora and fauna, fossils, rocks, minerals and dioramas of Maltese habitats.

The palace's forecourt was restored in the early 2000s at a cost of around Lm46,000. It was inaugurated by the President of Malta, Guido de Marco, in July 2002.

The building was included on the Antiquities List of 1925. It is now a Grade 1 national monument, and it is listed on the National Inventory of the Cultural Property of the Maltese Islands.

== Architecture ==
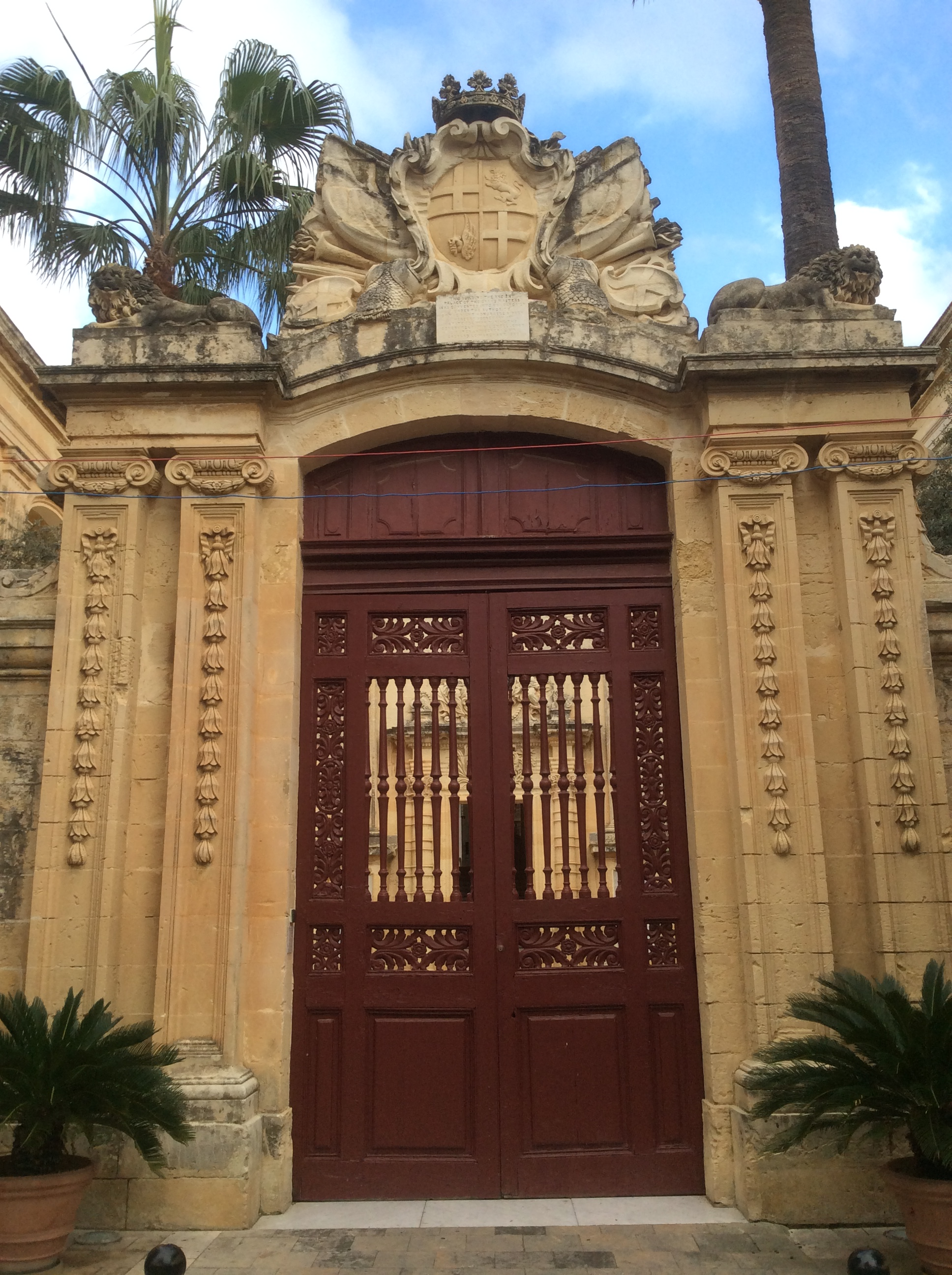
The arch leading to the forecourt

Vilhena Palace is a large building which is considered to be "an excellent example of French Baroque." It has a U-shaped forecourt surrounded with loggias, which follows the plan of the original castle, and it possibly contains some remnants of the 16th-century palace incorporated into the structure. The forecourt is approached through a gate decorated with Vilhena's coat of arms. The central façade of the palace contains the ornate main doorway, which is flanked by Corinthian columns and is surmounted by a bronze relief of De Vilhena and another coat of arms.

The palace's interior is irregularly planned, contrasting sharply with the regularity and balance of the exterior. The building also contains an inner courtyard.

Vilhena Palace is linked to the Corte Capitanale, which was built at the same time as the palace and was also designed by Mondion. This building served as Mdina's law courts, and its linking to the palace was a symbolic gesture to convey that the courts were under the jurisdiction of the Order of St. John. The Corte Capitanale now serves as the seat of Mdina's local council.

== See also ==
- List of Baroque residences
- Casa Leoni, another palace built by Vilhena
