= Banca Giuratale (Mdina) =

- Banka Ġuratali
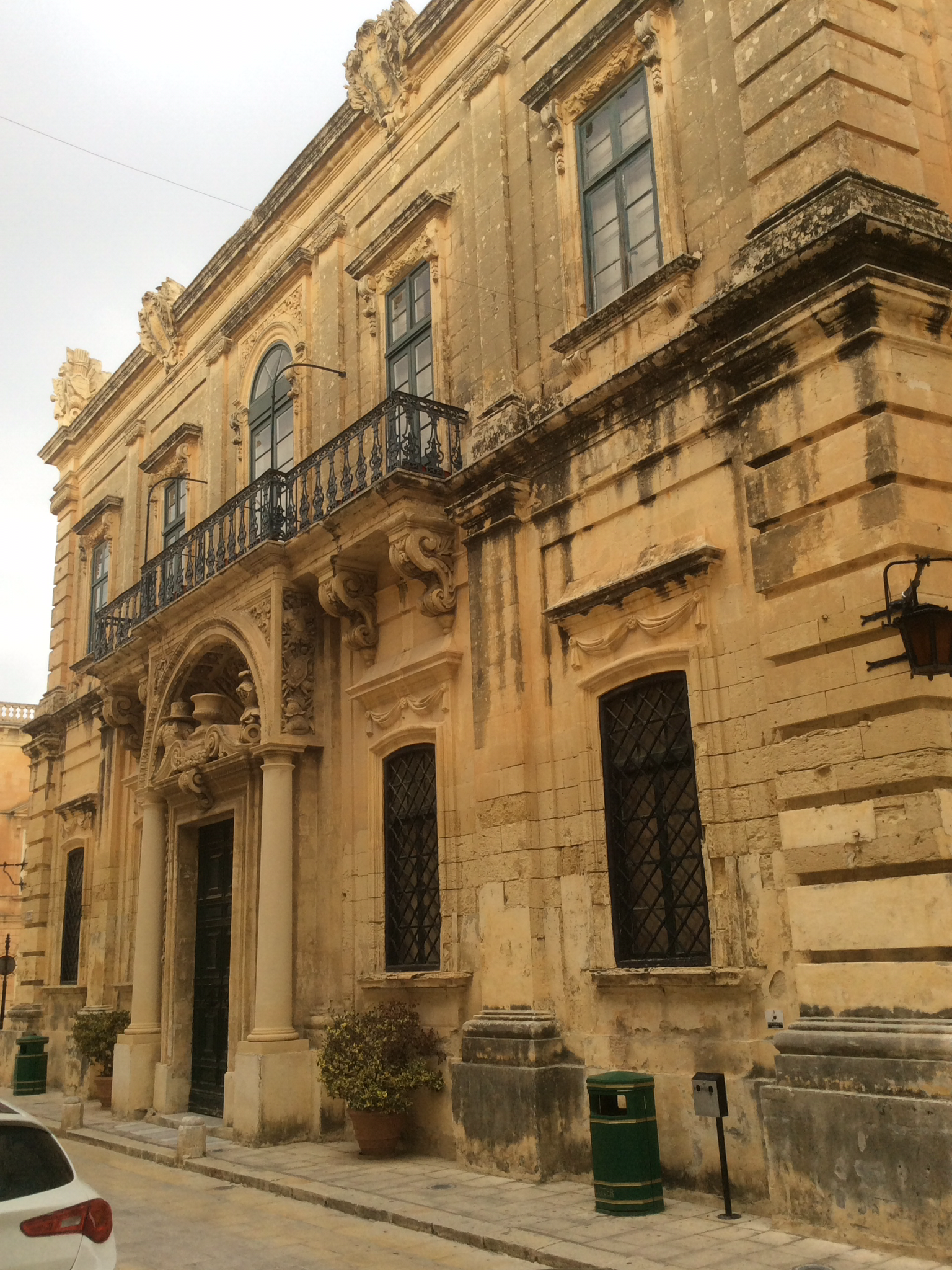
- View of the Banca Giuratale
- Interactive map of the Banca Giuratale area
- Alternative names: Municipal Palace

General information
- Status: Intact
- Type: City hall
- Architectural style: Baroque
- Location: Mdina, Malta
- Coordinates: 35°53′9.87″N 14°24′12.23″E
- Current tenants: National Archives of Malta
- Construction started: 1726
- Completed: 1728

Technical details
- Material: Limestone

Design and construction
- Architect: Charles François de Mondion

The Banca Giuratale (Maltese: Banka Ġuratali), also known as the Municipal Palace (Maltese: Palazz Muniċipali), is a public building in Mdina, Malta. It was built in the 18th century to house the city's administrative council and courts, and was later used as a private residence and a school. It now houses part of the National Archives of Malta.

== History ==
The site was originally occupied by the Archives Building of Mdina. The Banca Giuratale was built between 1726 and 1728 to house the Università, the civil administrative council of Mdina, after their original premises were taken over by Grand Master António Manoel de Vilhena in order to build Palazzo Vilhena. The new building was designed by Charles François de Mondion, a French architect who was responsible for rebuilding many buildings in Mdina. It also housed the district court.

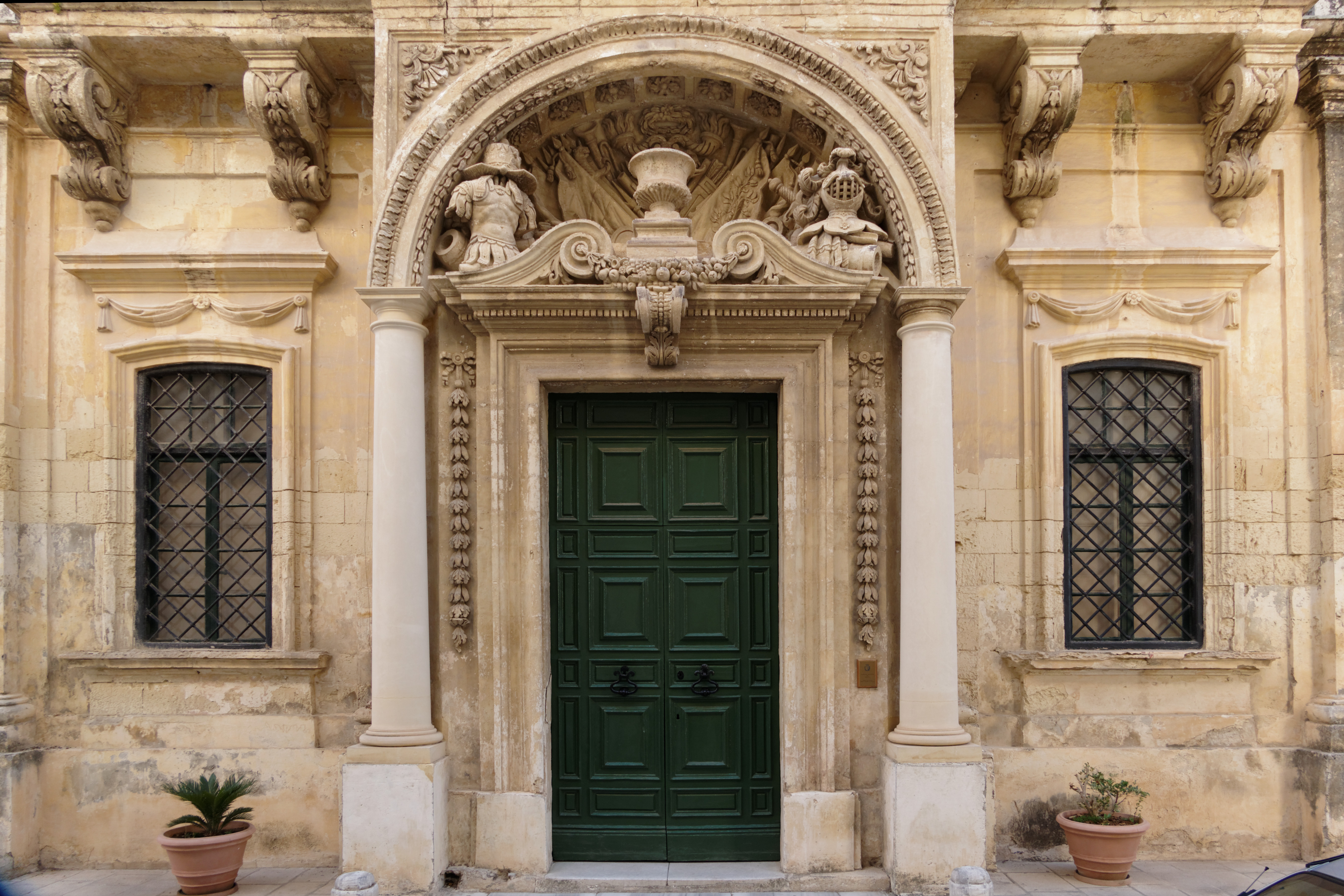
Details of the façade and main entrance

During the Maltese uprising against the French occupation of Malta, the Banca Giuratale was the meeting place of the National Assembly, which was set up by the Maltese to govern the island and blockade the French forces.

The building was leased to private individuals in 1831. In 1881, the Education Department converted it into a secondary school, which closed in 1969. The Sisters of St. Dorothy subsequently used the building as a private school, until the lease was terminated in 1978.

Since 1988, the Banca Giuratale has housed the Legal Documentation Section of the National Archives of Malta. The archives contain all the court records from 1530 to 1899, including the documents of the Consolato del Mare di Malta, Malta's maritime tribunal between 1697 and 1814.

The Banca Giuratale of Mdina along with that of Gozo was depicted on the Lm2 banknote that was in circulation between 1989 and 2007.

In 2012, Mdina's local council, which is housed in the Corte Capitanale, requested to use the Banca Giuratale as its premises.

The building was included on the Antiquities List of 1925. It is now a Grade 1 national monument, and it is also listed on the National Inventory of the Cultural Property of the Maltese Islands.

== Architecture ==
The Banca Giuratale is built in the Baroque style. The main entrance has a richly decorated semicircular vault, which is supported on two columns.

== See also ==
- Corte Capitanale, Mdina's present city hall
