= Corte Capitanale =

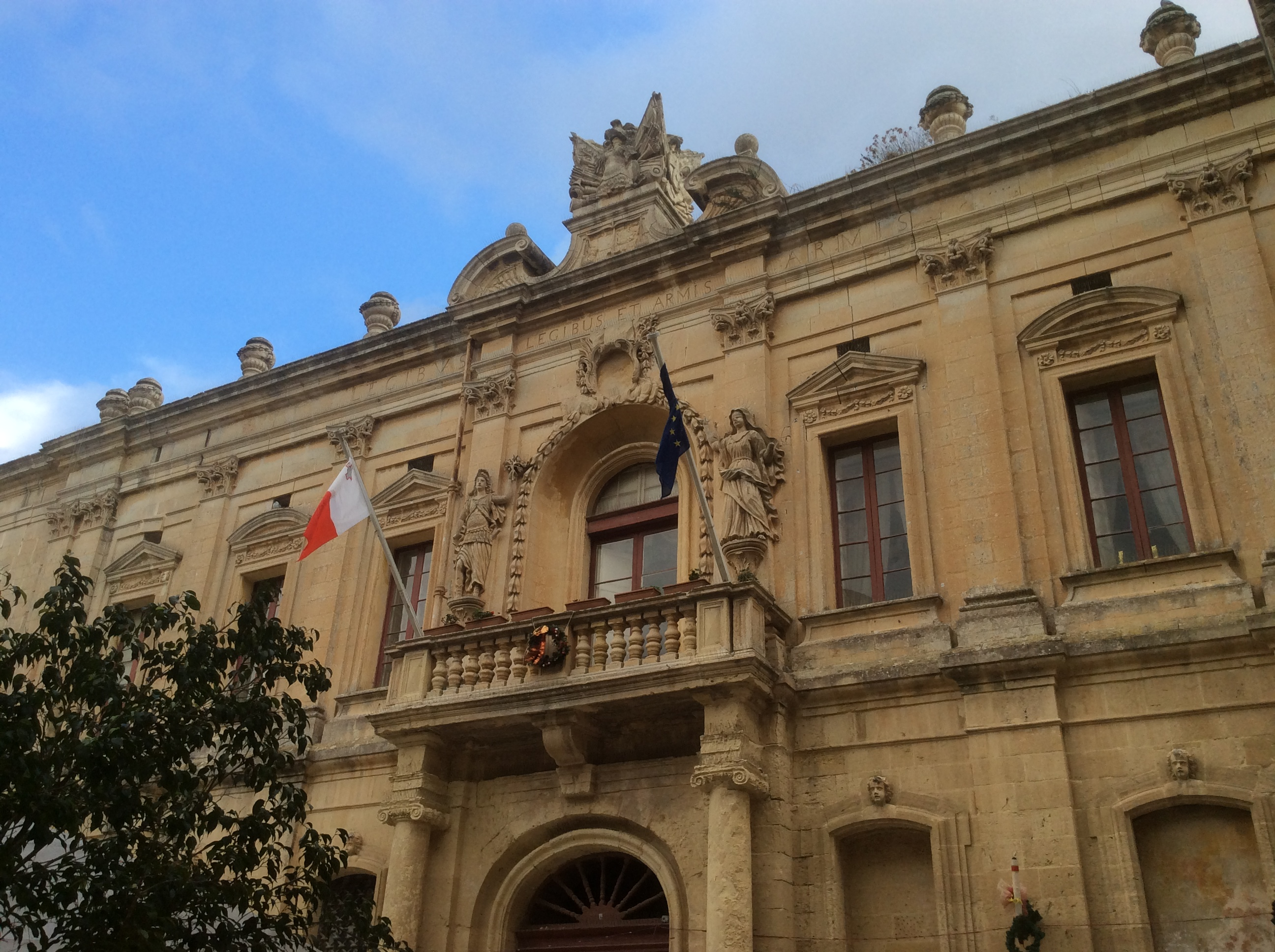
- Façade of the Corte Capitanale
- Interactive map of the Corte Capitanale area

General information
- Status: Intact
- Type: Courthouse
- Architectural style: Baroque
- Location: Mdina, Malta
- Coordinates: 35°53′5.81″N 14°24′14.9″E
- Current tenants: Mdina Local Council
- Construction started: 1726
- Completed: 1728
- Owner: Government of Malta

Technical details
- Material: Limestone
- Floor count: 2

Design and construction
- Architect: Charles François de Mondion

The Corte Capitanale is a former courthouse in Mdina, Malta, which currently serves as a city hall. It was built in the Baroque style between 1726 and 1728, to designs of the French architect Charles François de Mondion. The building is linked to Palazzo Vilhena, but it has its own entrance and façade.

== History ==
The Corte Capitanale was built between 1726 and 1728 along with the rest of Palazzo Vilhena, the Grand Master's official residence in Mdina. The building was mainly a courthouse, but it also served as the seat of the Capitano della Verga.

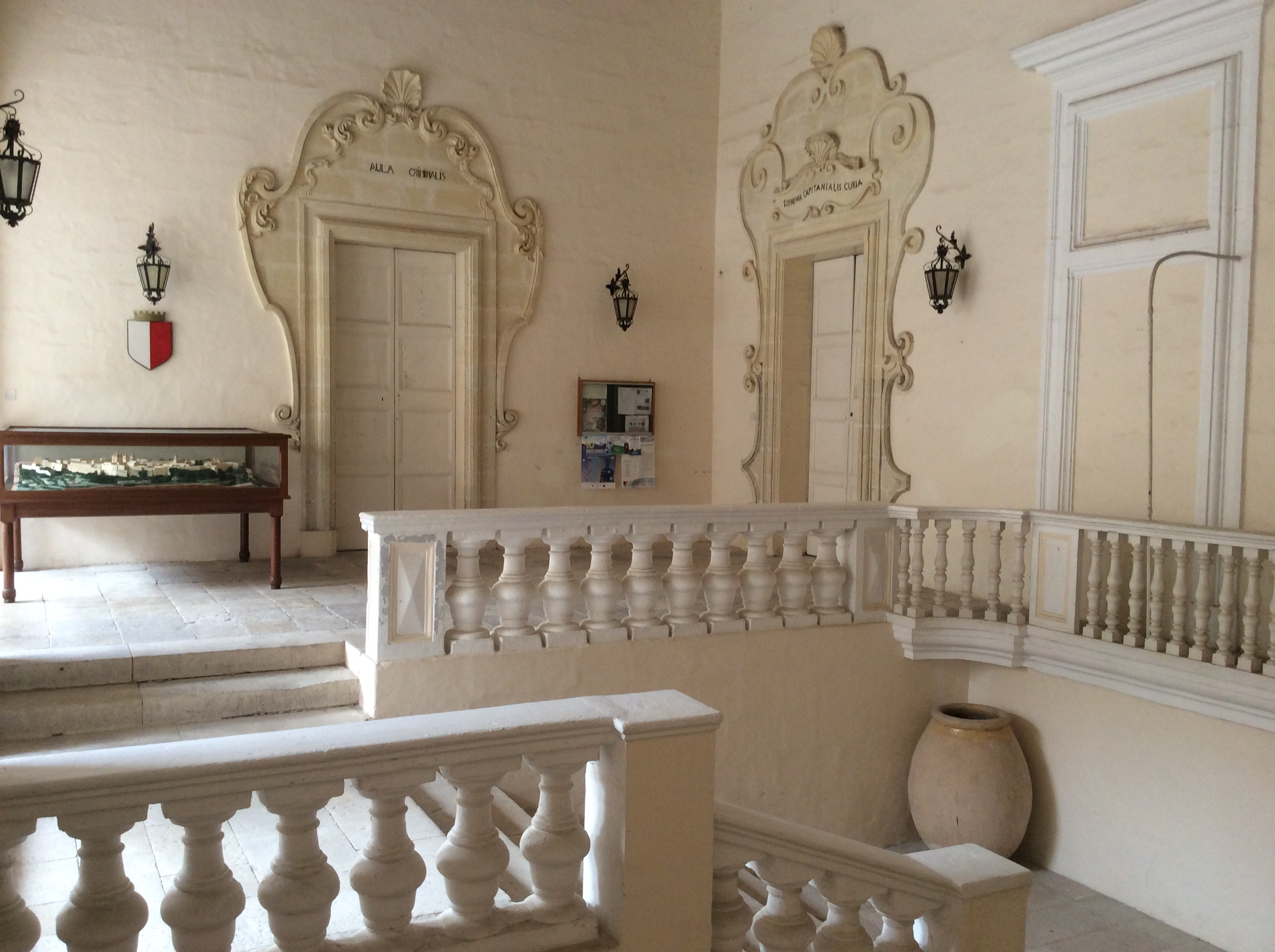
Stairway with the doors of the courtrooms

Its linking to the palace was a symbolic gesture to convey the fact that the courts were under the jurisdiction of the Order of St. John. The courthouse was also linked to the Bishop's Palace through a now-blocked underground passage, indicating the Church's role in the courts.

During the French occupation of Malta, a Maltese doctor was accused of spying for the French by the Maltese insurgents. Despite not being found guilty by the court, the Maltese requested for him to be given a death sentence. Though the judge refused their demand, the Maltese assassinated him as soon as he exited the building.

In 1813 Civil Commissioner Alexander Ball terminated and transferred the judicial power of the Corte Capitanale of Mdina to the Castellania in Valletta.

Today, the Corte Capitanale is Mdina's city hall, being the seat of the city's local council. The council considers the building as inadequate, and in 2012 it requested to move its premises to the Banca Giuratale. It is not regularly open to the public, but the main hall is occasionally open with temporary historical or cultural exhibitions.

The building was included on the Antiquities List of 1925. It is now a Grade 1 national monument and it is listed on the National Inventory of the Cultural Property of the Maltese Islands.

== Architecture ==
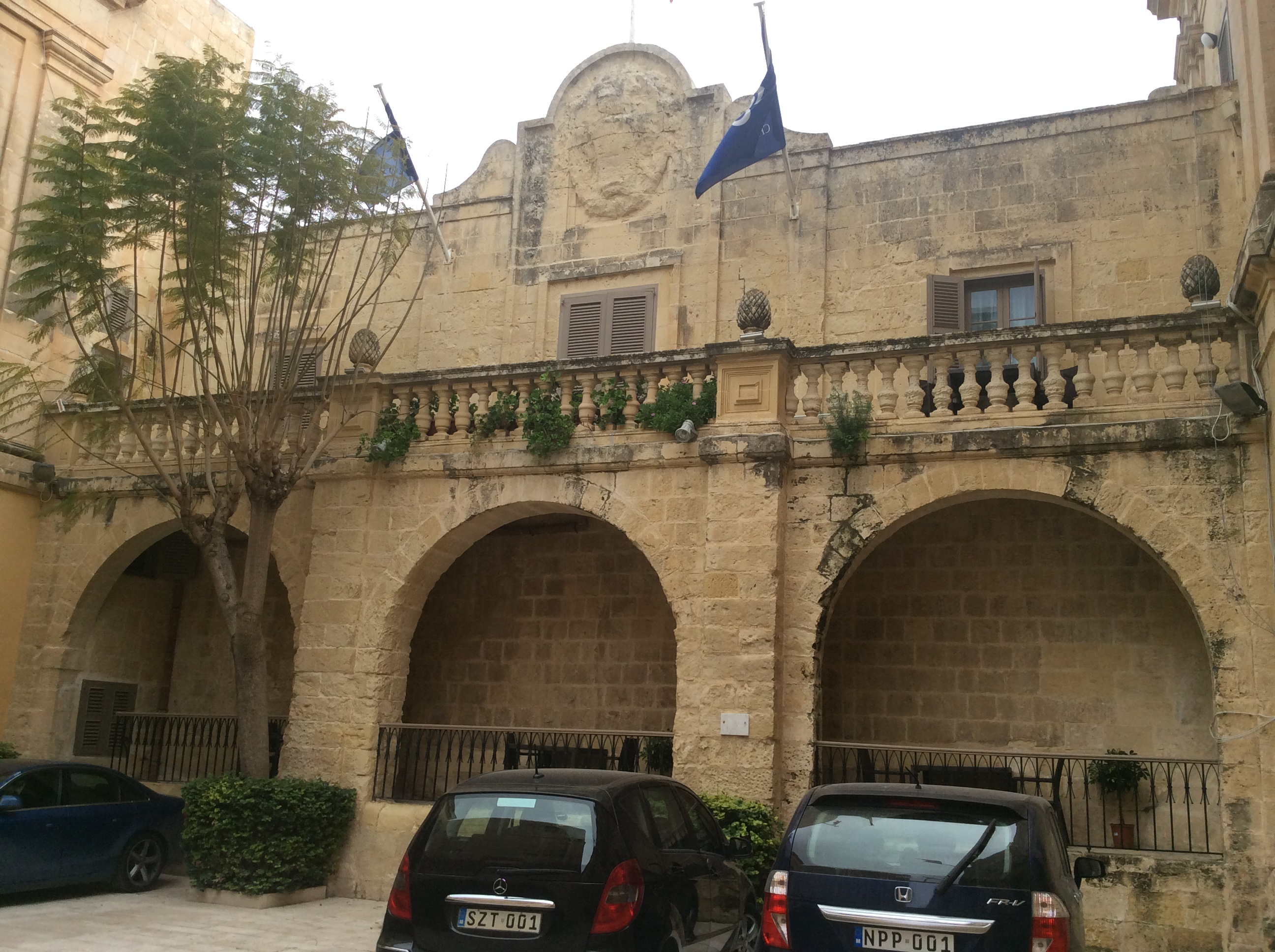
Herald's Loggia

The Corte Capitanale is built in the French Baroque style. The façade is decorated by superimposed Tuscan and Corinthian pilasters, and a cornice along roof level. A balcony is located above the main doorway, and it is decorated with allegorical statues of Justice and Mercy. The inscription Legibus et Armis (by using laws and arms) is inscribed below the centrepiece of the façade.

The courthouse incorporates some prison cells and dungeons, which had been built in the 16th century. The building is also linked to a loggia known as Herald's Loggia, from which town criers used to announce decrees to the people. The loggia also predates the courthouse, and it is believed to date to the 17th century.
