= Maltese lira =

Currency of Malta from 1825 to 2007

Maltese pound (English); Lira Maltija (Maltese)
Maltese banknotes
Maltese coins

ISO 4217
- Code: MTL until June 1983: MTP, Maltese pound

Units of account
- Plural: liri
- Symbol: ₤M and Lm
- Subunit
- 1/100: cent (c)
- 1/1000: mill (m)

Denominations
- Banknotes: Lm 2, Lm 5, Lm 10, Lm 20
- Coins
- Freq. used: 1c, 2c, 5c, 10c, 25c, 50c, Lm 1

Demographics
- User(s): None, previously: Malta

Issuance
- Central bank: Board of Commissioners of Currency (1940-1968); Central Bank of Malta (1968-2007)
- Website: www.centralbankmalta.com

Valuation
- Inflation: 2.8%
- Source: The World Factbook, 2006 est.

EU Exchange Rate Mechanism (ERM)
- Since: 2 May 2005
- Fixed rate since: 2 May 2005
- Replaced by euro, non cash: 1 January 2008
- Replaced by euro, cash: 31 January 2008
- 1 € =: Lm 0.429300
- Band: pegged in practice, 15% de jure
- This infobox shows the latest status before this currency was rendered obsolete.

The lira (Maltese: lira Maltija, plural: liri, ISO 4217 code: MTL) or pound (until ca. 1986 in English, code MTP) was the currency of Malta from 1972 until 31 December 2007. One lira was divided into 100 cents, each of 10 mils. After 1986 the lira was abbreviated as Lm, although the original ₤M sign continued to be used unofficially. In English the currency was still frequently called the pound even after its official English language name was changed to lira.

The euro replaced the lira as the official currency of Malta on 1 January 2008 at the irrevocable fixed exchange rate of €1 per Lm 0.4293, or approximately €2.33 per Lm 1.

== History ==
=== Sterling ===
In 1825, an imperial order-in-council introduced sterling coinage to Malta, replacing a system under which various coinages circulated, including that issued in Malta by the Knights of St John. The pound was valued at 12 scudi of the local currency. This exchange rate meant that the smallest Maltese coin, the grano, was worth one third of a farthing (1 scudo = 20 tari = 240 grani). Consequently, 1/3-farthing (1/12-penny) coins were issued for use in Malta until 1913, alongside the regular sterling coinage. Amongst the British colonies which used sterling coinage, Malta was unique in issuing a 1/3-farthing coin.

Between 1914 and 1918, wartime emergency paper money issues were made by the government.

Until 1972, the pound was divided into 20 shillings, each of 12 pence with 4 farthings to the penny; from May 1972 it was decimalised into 100 cents, and each cent into 10 mils.

Pre-decimal sterling coinage continued to circulate in Malta for nearly a year after it was withdrawn in the UK due to decimalisation as Malta did not decimalise until 1972. Although the Maltese pound was initially equal to its sterling counterpart, this parity did not survive long after the floating of sterling on 22 June 1972.

==== Banknotes ====
Emergency issues between 1914 and 1918 were in denominations of 5 and 10 shillings, ₤1, ₤5 and ₤10. In 1940, notes dated 13 September 1939 in denominations of 2/6, 5/–, 10/– and ₤1 were issued, followed late in the year by a provisional 1/– note overprinted on old 2/– notes dated 20 November 1918. Note production continued after the Second World War in denominations of 10/- and ₤1, with ₤5 notes reintroduced between 1961 and 1963.

After the Central Bank of Malta was established by the Central Bank Act of 1967 and began operating on April 17, 1968, the issuing body named on the banknotes switched from "Government of Malta" to "Central Bank of Malta." While the designs of the notes remained unchanged, the colors were changed. The Central Bank refers to this series as the "CBM first series". The CBM second series began with the introduction of lira-denominated notes on January 15, 1973.

=== Lira ===
Banknotes issued by the Government of Malta and then by the Central Bank of Malta were written in English up to 1972. From 1973 to 1985, they were written in Maltese on the obverse (with the currency identified as "lira"), and in English on the reverse (identifying the currency as pound). From 1986 to 2007, Maltese was used on both sides.

Although exclusively using British coins at that time, Malta did not decimalise with the UK in 1971. Instead, decimalisation occurred a year later, on the "pound and mil" system, dividing the pound into 1,000 mils and 100 cents. The Maltese name "lira" and the English name "pound" were used concurrently on banknotes until 1986, when "lira" became the official name of the currency in both languages. Mil denominated coins were removed from circulation in 1994.

On entry into the European Union, Malta agreed to adopt the euro. The lira was replaced by the euro on 1 January 2008, as part of the Economic and Monetary Union of the European Union.

=== Euro changeover ===
The Maltese lira was replaced by the euro as the official currency of Malta at the irrevocable fixed exchange rate of Lm 0.429300 per €1. However, Maltese lira banknotes and coins continued to have legal tender status and were accepted for cash payments until 31 January 2008. Maltese lira were convertible free of charge at all Maltese credit institutions until 30 March 2008. Maltese coins were convertible at the Central Bank of Malta until 1 February 2010, and banknotes remained convertible until 31 January 2018.

== Exchange rate ==
The cost of one euro in Maltese lira's (from 1999 till 2007).

Since the Maltese currency was considered a local issue of sterling rather than an entirely separate currency until 13 December 1971, the two currencies maintained an exact 1:1 equivalence with each other. Afterwards, the Maltese currency was allowed to float, anchored to a basket of reserve currencies. The lira had subsequently been worth around GBP 1.60. After the Kuwaiti dinar, it was the second-highest-valued currency unit in the world, being worth US$3.1596 as of 28 April 2007. After the dollar weakened against other currencies in mid-2006, the lira was worth US$3.35289 as of 16 December 2007.

The currency entered the ERM II on 2 May 2005, by which its value had to be maintained within a 15% band around the central parity rate of Lm 0.429300 per euro. The Central Bank of Malta and Maltese Government unilaterally decided to keep the actual Lm/€ exchange rate equal to the central parity rate (i.e., doing away with the 15% band) throughout the ERM II period.

The irrevocable fixed conversion rate was established by the ECOFIN on 10 July 2007, at Lm 0.4293 to one euro.

== Coins ==
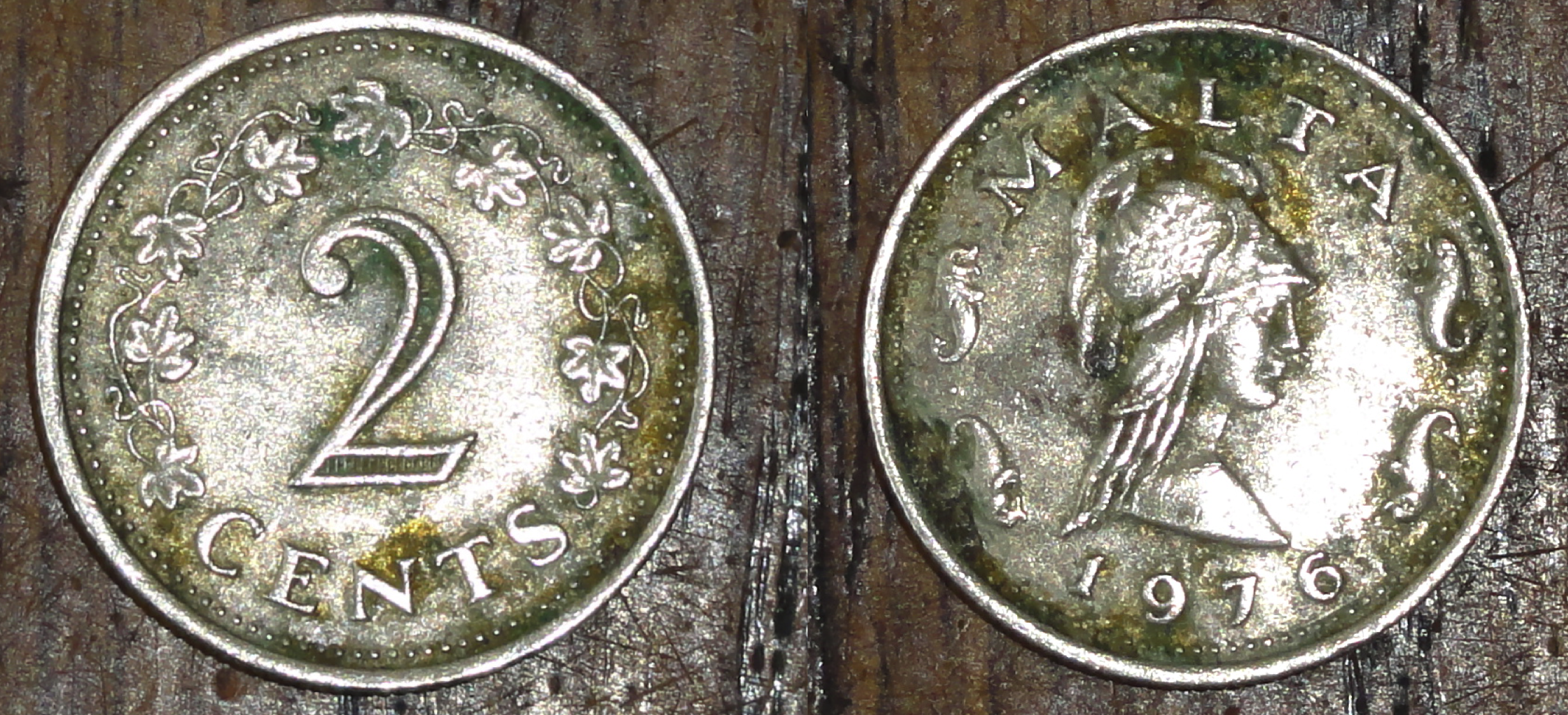
Maltese 2 cent coin, 1976

Decimal coinage was introduced in 1972 (one year after the United Kingdom) based on the "pound and mil" system proposed in 1855 by Sir William Brown MP in denominations of 2, 3, and 5 mils, 1, 2, 5, 10, and 50 cents. There was no one-mil coin, although, the coins that were provided (2m, 3m, and 5m) allowed goods to be priced (and change given) for any number of mils. In 1975, a 25c coin was introduced.

A new coinage was issued in 1986 in denominations of 1c, 2c, 5c, 10c, 25c and 50c and Lm 1. A third series was introduced in 1991 due to the change in Malta's coat of arms. The mils were withdrawn in 1994, although for some time only the 5 mils had been seen (and then only rarely).

== Banknotes ==
On 15 January 1973, banknotes were introduced, denominated in liri on the obverse and pounds on the reverse, in denominations of ₤M 1, ₤M 5 and ₤M 10. In 1986, ₤M1 notes were replaced by coins and Lm 2 and Lm 20 notes were introduced.

First series (1967)
| Image | Value | Euro equivalent | Dimensions (mm) | Main colour | Description | | Issue | Withdrawn | Lapse |
| Image | Value | Euro equivalent | Dimensions (mm) | Main colour | Obverse | Reverse | Issue | Withdrawn | Lapse |
|---|---|---|---|---|---|---|---|---|---|
| | 10/- | | 133 × 70 | Red | Elizabeth II; George's Cross | Mġarr, Gozo; Għajnsielem church, Gozo | 13 June 1968 | 30 June 1972 | |
| | ₤M 1 | | 139 × 76 | Green | Elizabeth II; George's Cross | Marsa Industrial Estate | 24 September 1969 | 15 April 1981 | |
| | ₤M 5 | | 145 × 82 | Brown | Elizabeth II; George's Cross | Grand Harbour, Valletta | 13 June 1968 | 15 April 1981 | |
Second series (1973)
| Image | Value | Euro equivalent | Dimensions (mm) | Main colour | Description | | Issue | Withdrawn | Lapse |
| Image | Value | Euro equivalent | Dimensions (mm) | Main colour | Obverse | Reverse | Issue | Withdrawn | Lapse |
| | ₤M 1 | | 138 × 69 | Green | Central bank coat of arms; map of Malta | St Paul's Cathedral, Mdina | 15 January 1973 | 1982 | |
| | ₤M 5 | | 145 × 78 | Blue | Central bank coat of arms; map of Malta | Yacht marina, Marsaxlokk | 15 January 1973 | 1983 | |
| | ₤m 10 | | 151 × 85 | Brown | Central bank coat of arms; map of Malta | Grand Harbour, Valletta | 15 January 1973 | | |
Third series (1979)
| Image | Value | Euro equivalent | Dimensions (mm) | Main colour | Description | | Issue | Withdrawn | Lapse |
| Image | Value | Euro equivalent | Dimensions (mm) | Main colour | Obverse | Reverse | Issue | Withdrawn | Lapse |
| | ₤M 1 | | 135 × 65 | Brown | Coat of arms; Il-Gardjola tower | New university | 30 March 1979 | 1993 | |
| | ₤M 5 | | 145 × 77 | Violet | Coat of arms; Statue of culture | Marsa Industrial Estate | 30 March 1979 | 1993 | |
| | ₤M 10 | | 152 × 85 | Pink | Coat of arms; Lady Justice, Castellania | Malta Dockyard | 30 March 1979 | | |
Fourth series (1986)
| Image | Value | Euro equivalent | Dimensions (mm) | Main colour | Description | | Issue | Withdrawn | Lapse |
| Image | Value | Euro equivalent | Dimensions (mm) | Main colour | Obverse | Reverse | Issue | Withdrawn | Lapse |
| | Lm 2 | €4.66 | 138 × 66.5 | Red | Agatha Barbara; Brigantine (1531). | Marsaxlokk harbour; gantry cranes | 17 March 1986 | 15 June 1998 | 15 June 2008 |
| | Lm 5 | €11.65 | 145 × 69 | Blue | Agatha Barbara; Speronara (1798) | Mellieħa Bay; fishing pot and lace making | 17 March 1986 | 15 June 1998 | 15 June 2008 |
| | Lm 10 | €23.29 | 152 × 72.5 | Green | Agatha Barbara; Tartana (1740) | Grand Harbour; Malta Dockyard | 17 March 1986 | 13 September 2000 | 13 September 2010 |
| | Lm 20 | €46.59 | 159 × 76 | Brown | Agatha Barbara; Xebec (1743) | Auberge de Castille; Worker's monument, Msida | 17 March 1986 | 30 November 1992 | 2 December 2002 |
Fifth series (1989–1994)
| Image | Value | Euro equivalent | Dimensions (mm) | Main colour | Description | | Issue | Withdrawn | Lapse |
| Image | Value | Euro equivalent | Dimensions (mm) | Main colour | Obverse | Reverse | Issue | Withdrawn | Lapse |
| | Lm 2 | €4.66 | 138 × 66.5 | Red | Melita; Roman mosaics; three doves, UN emblem, Central bank coat of arms | Banca Giuratale, Mdina; Banca Giuratale, Victoria, Gozo | 18 September 1989; 1 June 1994 | 31 January 2008 | 31 January 2018 |
| | Lm 5 | €11.65 | 145 × 69 | Blue | Melita; Roman mosaics; three doves, UN emblem, Central bank coat of arms | Mdina Gate, Torre dello Standardo; Maltese declaration of human rights | 18 September 1989; 1 June 1994 | 31 January 2008 | 31 January 2018 |
| | Lm 10 | €23.29 | 152 × 72.5 | Green | Melita; Roman mosaics; three doves, UN emblem, Central bank coat of arms | Sette Giugno monument, Valletta; National assembly meeting | 18 September 1989; 1 June 1994 | 31 January 2008 | 31 January 2018 |
| | Lm 20 | €46.59 | 159 × 76 | Brown orange | Melita; Roman mosaics; three doves, UN emblem, Central bank coat of arms | George Borg Olivier, flag raising; Independence marble tablet | 18 September 1989; 1 June 1994 | 31 January 2008 | 31 January 2018 |
| For table standards, see the banknote specification table. | | | | | | | | | |

== See also ==
- Banknotes of the Anglo-Egyptian Banking Company Limited (Malta)
- Maltese euro coins
- Euro gold and silver commemorative coins (Malta)
- Economy of Malta
