= Pietro Paolo Troisi =

Maltese silversmith and architect

- Born: 29 June 1686; Valletta, Hospitaller Malta
- Died: March or April 1743 (aged 56)
- Education: Accademia di San Luca
- Occupations: Silversmith; Sculptor; Designer; Master of the Mint
- Style: Baroque
- Spouse: Magdalena Marcella Desira (m. 1716)
- Children: 5
- Parents: Carlo Antonio Troisi (father); Ninfa Bison (mother)

Pietro Paolo Troisi (29 June 1686 – March or April 1743) was a Maltese Baroque silversmith, sculptor, medallist, designer, engraver and Master of the Mint. His works include bronze sculptures of his patron António Manoel de Vilhena, designs of various coins and medals, a wide range of mainly religious works in silver, engraved portraits, designs for temporary triumphal arches and designs for works in a number of churches, most notably the altar of repose at the Mdina cathedral.

== Biography ==
Pietro Paolo Troisi was the son of Carlo Antonio Troisi and Ninfa née Bison, and he was the second of eight or nine children. His family was probably of Sicilian descent. He was born in Valletta on 29 June 1686, and he was baptised at the Porto Salvo parish church on 2 July.

Troisi's first training was at his father's bottega in Malta. Between 1704 and 1705, Troisi studied at the Accademia di San Luca in Rome, on the recommendation of Grand Master Ramon Perellos y Roccaful. He is the second known Maltese artist to have been admitted into the academy, after Melchiorre Cafà. While in Rome, he joined the bottega of the sculptor Pietro Papaleo. Due to his talent, he was promoted to the advanced students' class, and in 1705 he and Antonio Arrighi won first prize in a competition with a religious subject, the Concorso Clementino Prima Classe.

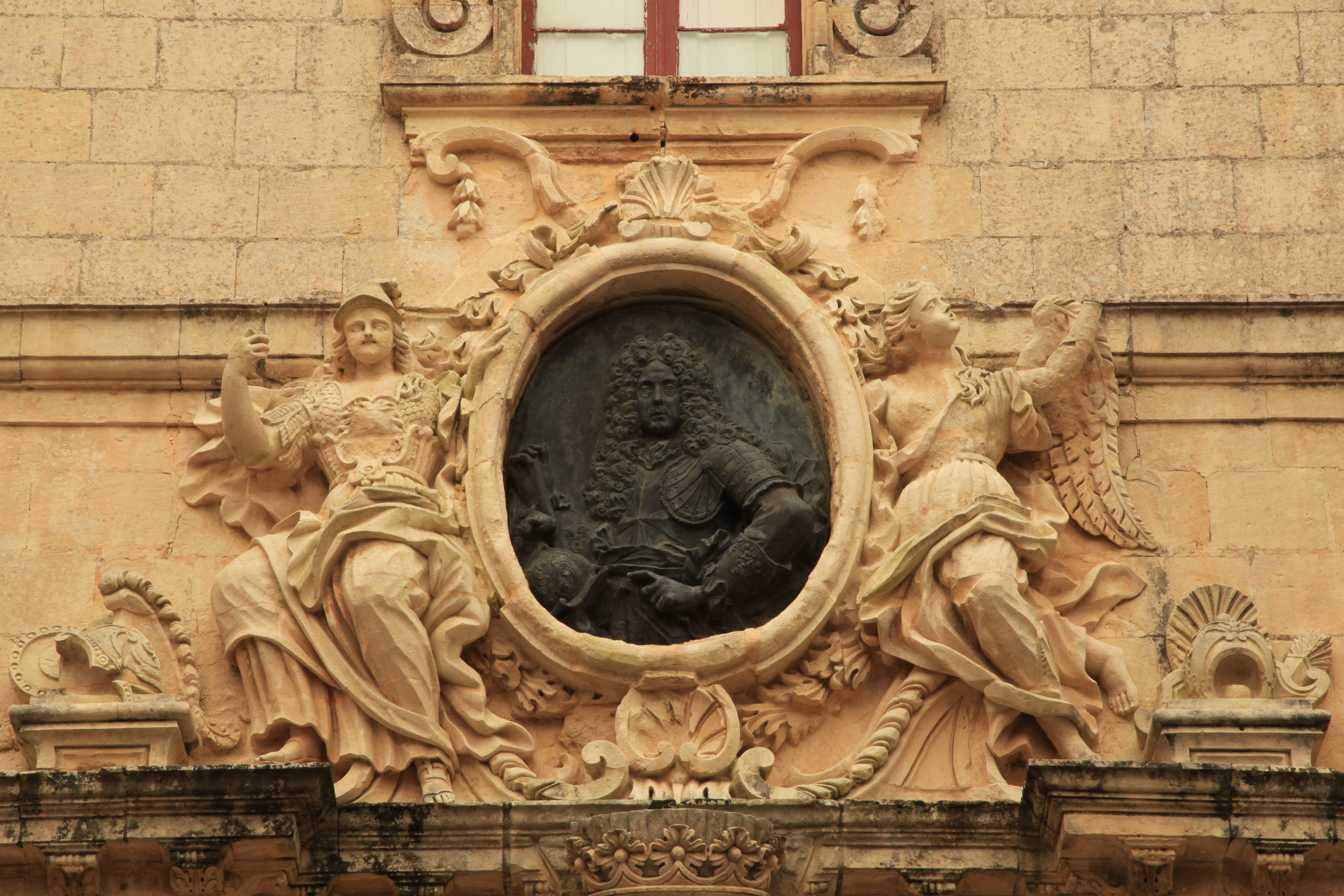
Bronze relief of Vilhena at the Magisterial Palace, Mdina, attributed to Troisi

Upon his return to Malta, Troisi made a name for himself as a successful artist in multiple genres. He was a silversmith, medallist, bronze sculptor, portraitist, designer and scenographer. He made designs for works which were carried out by other artisans, and although he was also given the title of architetto, he does not seem to have designed buildings. He also taught drawing of nude figures, and he co-founded a school of design and painting at the Mint in Valletta together with Marc'Antonio Zondadari (who would later become Grand Master of the Order of St John). Troisi was patronised by Zondadari's successor, António Manoel de Vilhena, who seems to have held him in high esteem. Throughout his career, Troisi collaborated with a number of Maltese sculptors and stone carvers such as Pietro Paolo Zahra and the Fabri brothers.

His father was the Master of the Mint of the Order, and Troisi also worked as his assistant. In April 1714, he petitioned Perellos to take his father's place, but remained an assistant until he finally became Master of the Mint in 1736. He retained the post until his death.

Troisi was a member of the Confraternity of Our Lady of Mount Carmel in the Carmelite church in Valletta from at least 1713 to his death, and at times he was appointed as the Confraternity's secretary, treasurer or rector.

Troisi married Magdalena Marcella Desira, a woman from Senglea, on 26 August 1716. They had five children: Philippus, Xaveria, Veronica, Gaetanus (later known as Gioacchino) and Paola (who died in infancy). Troisi drew up his will on 27 March 1743, and he died soon afterwards, either in late March or early April, at the age of 56. (Note: Prior to 2010, the year of his death was unknown and he was said to have died in around 1750.) In his will he wished to be buried at the Carmelite church in Valletta. His wife Magdalena died in January 1758.

== Works ==
=== Triumphal arches for Zondadari and Vilhena ===
Troisi designed two temporary triumphal arches for the possesso ceremonies of 1720 and 1722. This was a celebration held at Mdina on the occasion of the election of a new Grand Master, in which officials of the city's Università would present the keys of the city to the new Grand Master. For the occasion, a temporary triumphal arch made out of wood would be built near the Banca Giuratale, and it would be dismantled shortly afterwards.

When Zondadari was elected Grand Master, Troisi was one of four artists who were invited to submit designs of the triumphal arch. Troisi's design was chosen, and the ceremony was held on 30 June 1720. Zondadari was succeeded by Vilhena in 1722, and Troisi was once again commissioned to design a triumphal arch which was to be made by remodelling the 1720 arch. Troisi made the designs and supervised its construction, while the woodwork was done by Andrea Camilleri and the painting was renewed by Aloisio Buhagiar. Vilhena's possesso was held on 20 September 1722.

Drawings of both arches still survive, and they were built in three tiers with a central coffered doorway. The arches depicted the emblems of the Università and the Grand Master along with a variety of military paraphernalia, while Vilhena's arch also contained his portrait and symbols of the Kingdom of Sicily.

=== Altar of repose at the Mdina cathedral ===
In 1727, Troisi was commissioned by Canon Gourgion on behalf of the Metropolitan Chapter to design an altar of repose for St Paul's Cathedral in Mdina. This is a moveable chapel intended for the exposition of the Eucharist on Maundy Thursday, and it is erected annually during Holy Week. Troisi was paid 5 scudi for his design, but other artists were also invited to submit their designs and the altar was not built during Troisi's lifetime. However, in 1751 the Chapter decided to build the altar and Troisi's design was chosen. The altar was built by Francesco Zahra and it was inaugurated in 1752.

The chapel consists of a triumphal arch-like portico with stairs leading to a circular space which contains a partial dome and richly decorated walls. A silver capsure made by Giovanni Andrea Troisi (Pietro Paolo's brother) and Annetto Pullicino serves as the centrepiece of the altar.

=== Engravings ===
Troisi engraved portraits of Grand Masters Zondadari and Vilhena in 1720 and 1724 respectively. The latter was published in the code of laws Leggi e costituzioni prammaticali.

He also made engravings on silverware, such as a dish depicting Victory over Land and Sea which was commissioned as a gift on the occasion of a marriage between the Pallavicini and Spinola families.

=== Bronze busts and statues ===
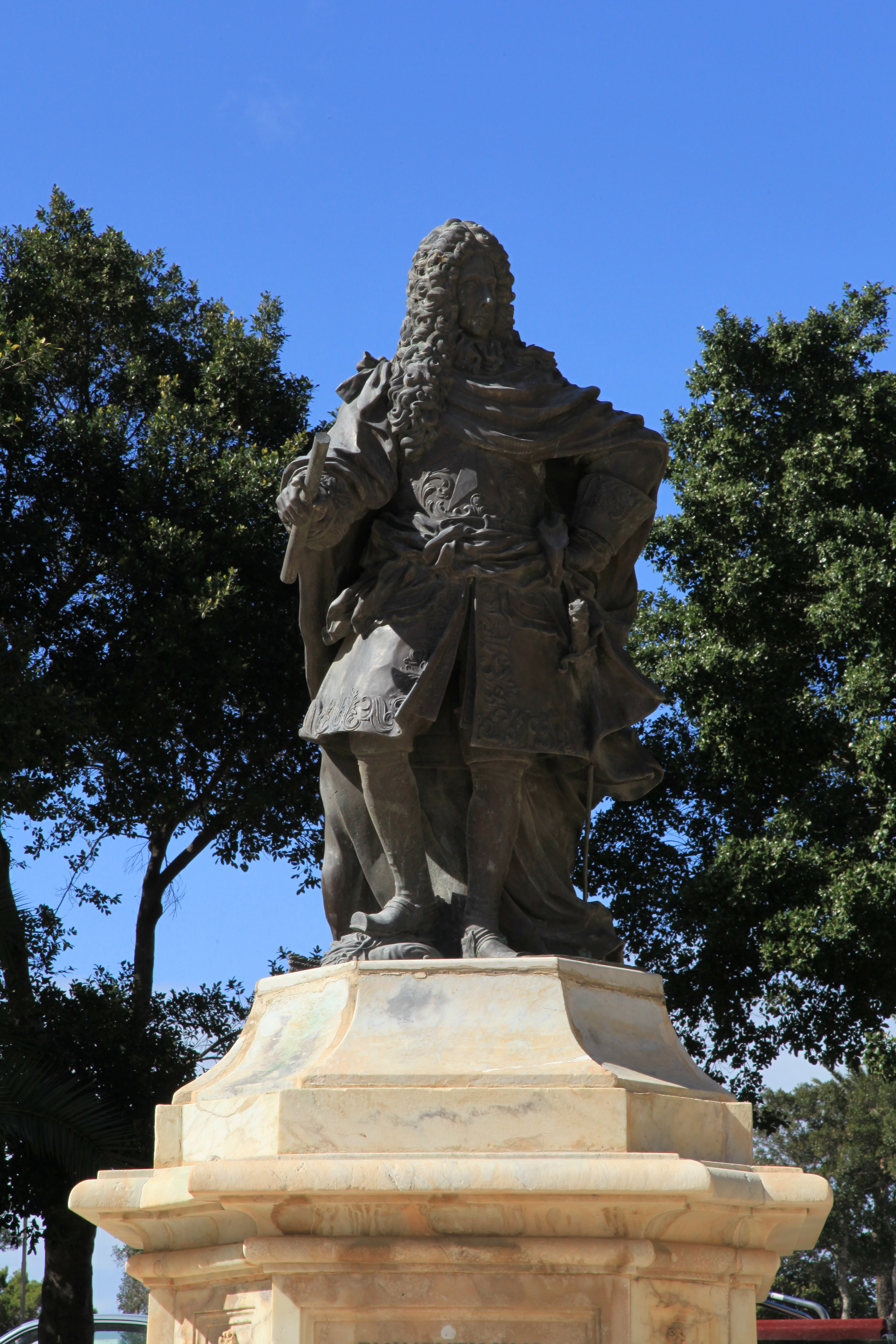
Bronze statue of Vilhena (1736) originally at Fort Manoel, attributed to Troisi

Troisi made a number of bronze busts depicting Grand Master Vilhena. He is known to have made two busts located at the Magisterial Palace and the Banca Giuratale in Mdina; the latter is now found at the Manoel Theatre museum. Other portraits of the Grand Master such as a tondo relief at the Magisterial Palace, and busts at the Franciscan convent in Valletta, the Conservatorio in Floriana and the Chancery in Valletta are also stylistically attributed to Troisi, although there is no documentary evidence of this.

The design of a life-size statue of Vilhena which was commissioned by the knight Felician de Savasse in 1734 is also attributed to Troisi. The statue was cast in bronze by Louis Bouchet, and it was installed in the piazza of Fort Manoel in 1736. The statue was relocated multiple times after 1858, and it is presently located in Pope John XXIII Square in Floriana.

=== Silverwork ===
Troisi was a skilled silversmith, and he gained these skills through apprenticeship with his father. His brothers Massimiliano and Giovanni Andrea and their children also worked in this trade. In 1721, he was commissioned to produce a silver ceremonial mace, possibly for the jurats of the Università of Mdina. He also manufactured a number of silver religious objects for churches, and details of some of his works are known through transactions.

In 1718, Troisi manufactured an altar antependium for the Archconfraternity of the Holy Cross at the Franciscan Church of St Mary of Jesus in Valletta. He is known to have produced a number of silver sanctuary lamps, including for the altar of Our Lady of the Rosary at the Senglea parish church in 1719 and for the high altar of St Paul's parish church in Valletta in 1733. In the 1720s, Troisi made a number of liturgical objects for the Lija parish church, including a case for the consecrated host, a pyx, a chalice and a paten; some of these were gilded in gold. He also manufactured a silver cross spearhead for the banner of the Confraternity of the Holy Rosary in Lija in 1726, and a reliquary for the Naxxar parish church in 1732. In 1738, he was commissioned to produce silver cards for the altar of Baby Jesus at the Franciscan Church of St Mary of Jesus in Valletta.

=== Coins and medals ===
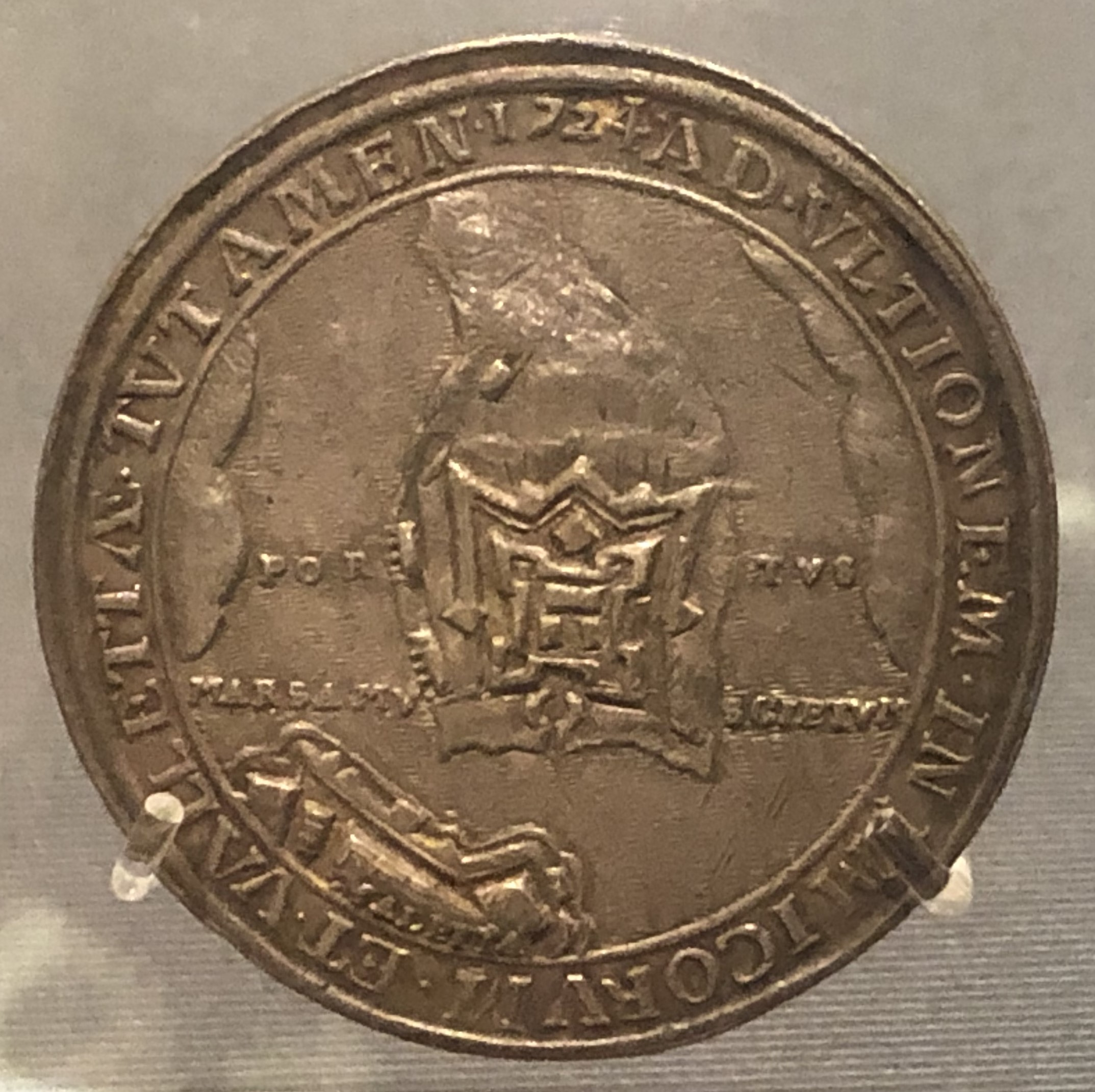
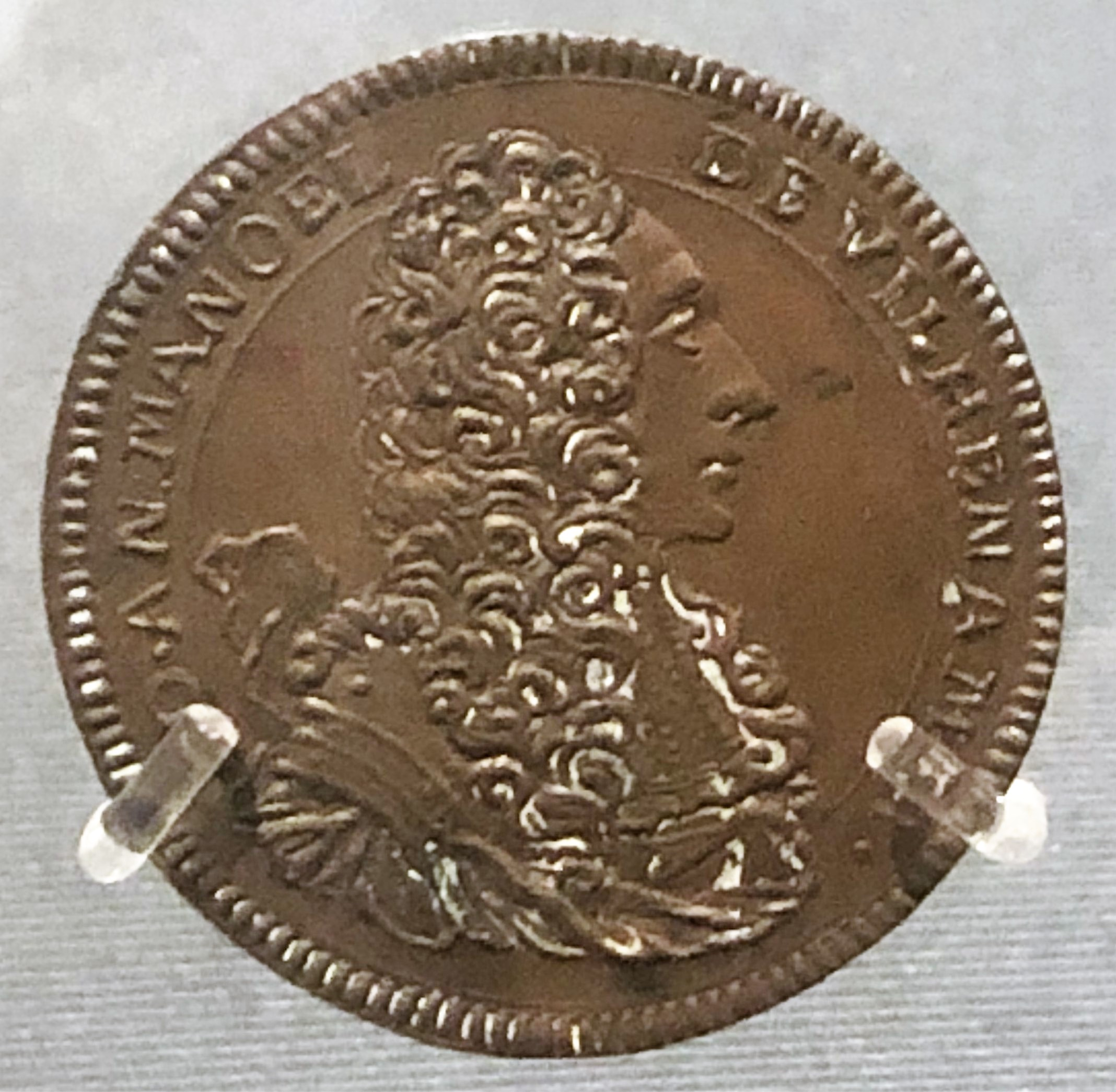
Medal commemorating the construction of Fort Manoel, cast by Troisi in 1724

Troisi was Master of the Mint from 1736 to his death in 1743, and he had previously been the assistant to his father who had held the post until his death 1730. Troisi designed dies of coinage depicting Grand Master Vilhena, and the artistic quality of the gold coins minted during Vilhena's magistracy was never surpassed during the Order's rule in Malta. Today these coins are highly sought after by collectors.

He also designed a number of commemorative medals during Vilhena's magistracy, such as a silver medal commemorating the construction of Fort Manoel in 1724.

=== Other works ===
Troisi also designed a number of reredoses at the Franciscan Conventual church in Rabat between 1710 and 1722, and collaborated with the sculptor Pietro Paolo Zahra and the Fabri brothers on a number of altar reconstructions in the same church along with the parish churches of Balzan and Żebbuġ.

Troisi also designed the reredos of the main altar of the Carmelite church in Mdina and that of the choir altar of the old church of St Mary in Birkirkara. He designed choir stalls in the churches of Lija and Żebbuġ. In the latter, he also designed the choir altar and a monstrance for a relic of the arm of St Philip.

Troisi designed the frame of a marble slab commemorating the consecration of the Parish Church of St George in Qormi in 1731. In 1735 he produced designs for wood carvings at the altar of St John the Evangelist in the Church of Our Lady of Victories, Valletta.
