= Chapel of St Anthony of Padua, Fort Manoel =

Chapel of St Anthony of Padua
- Kappella ta' Sant'Antnin ta' Padova
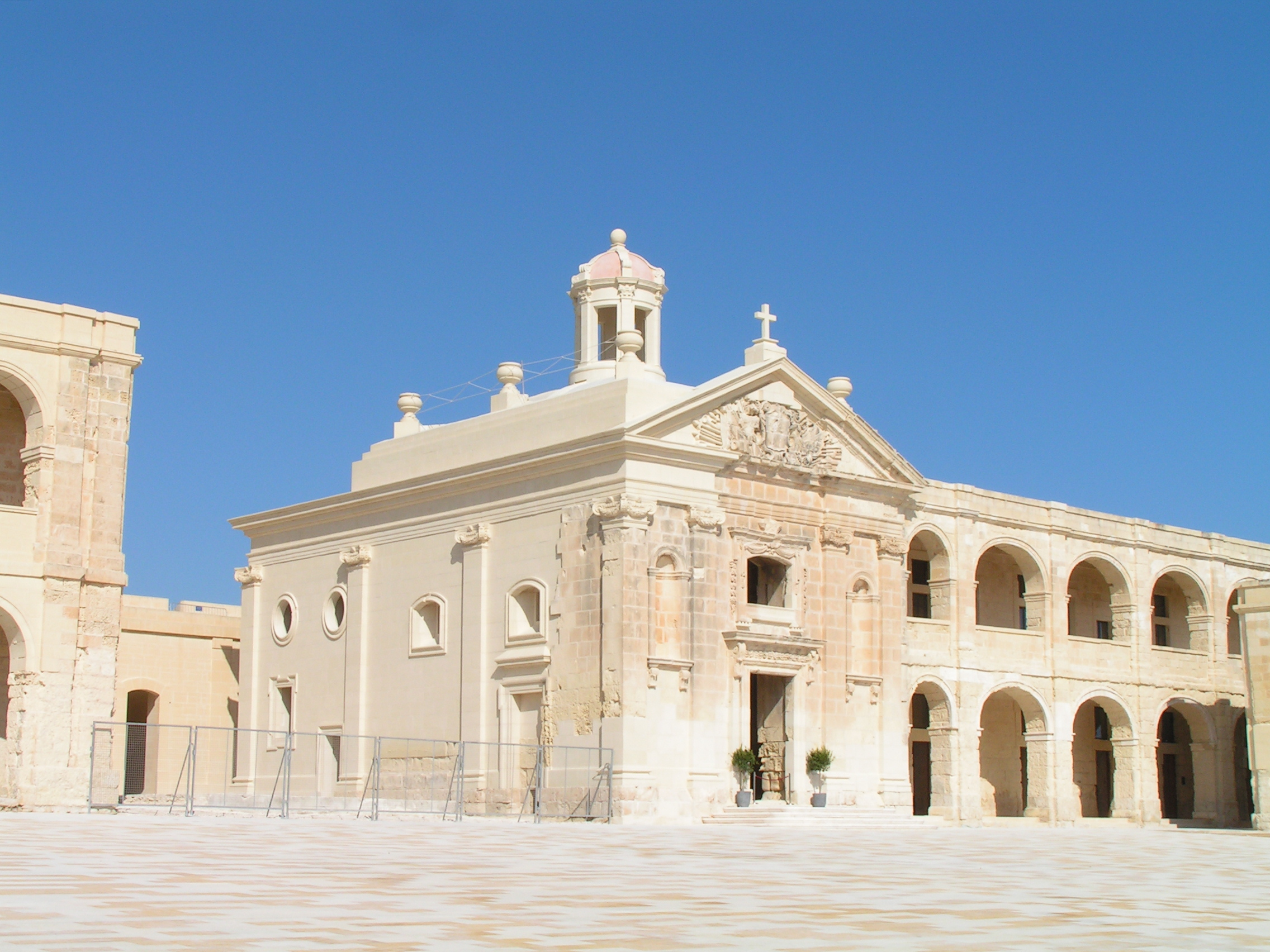
- The reconstructed chapel in 2009
- Chapel of St Anthony of Padua
- 35°54′11.4″N 14°30′18.4″E
- Location: Fort Manoel, Gżira, Malta
- Denomination: Roman Catholic

History
- Status: Chapel; Parish church (formerly)
- Dedication: Anthony of Padua
- Consecrated: 9 June 1727

Architecture
- Style: Baroque
- Years built: 1727; 2007–2009 (reconstruction)

Specifications
- Materials: Limestone

The Chapel of St Anthony of Padua (Maltese: Kappella ta' Sant'Antnin ta' Padova) is a Roman Catholic chapel located in Fort Manoel on Manoel Island in Gżira, Malta. It was completed in 1727 as an integral part of the fort, and it was partially destroyed by aerial bombardment in 1942 during World War II. The chapel was reconstructed as part of a restoration project and it was completed in 2009.

== History ==
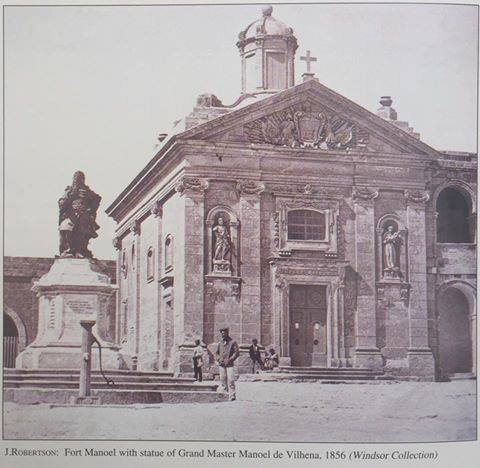
St Anthony's chapel and the Statue of António Manoel de Vilhena (which stood in the fort from 1736 to 1858) in a 1856 photograph by James Robertson

Fort Manoel is a star fort which was constructed by the Order of St John in the 1720s on Manoel Island. It was financed by and named after Grand Master António Manoel de Vilhena. Churches were important features of Hospitaller fortifications due to the Order's religious nature, and the Chapel of St Anthony of Padua was designed as a central feature within the fort's main piazza.

The chapel was one of the first parts of the fort to be completed, and by 1727 its dome was being built and the interior was being decorated. It was consecrated on 9 June 1727 by Bishop Melchiore Alphera in the presence of Grand Master de Vilhena and various other knights and dignitaries including the fort's commander Gio Alessio Margon. It became a parish church in 1728, with Michele Angelo Pisani being appointed as its parish priest on 28 June 1729.

While the fort was garrisoned by the Hospitallers, two masses were celebrated within the chapel every day. Two confraternities dedicated to St Anthony and St Anne were also permitted to meet at the chapel in the 18th century. These were later merged into a single confraternity of St Anne, and it continued to use the chapel until 1775, when it was closed to the public after the Rising of the Priests.

The piazza of Fort Manoel, including the chapel and the Vilhena statue, was the subject of the earliest known photographs of Malta which were taken in 1840 by Horace Vernet while he was quarantined at the nearby Lazzaretto. It is documented that the photographs were taken in the presence of a group of guests including Governor Henry Bouverie, but today the photos themselves seem to be lost.

The chapel was hit by aerial bombardment in 1942 during World War II. About two thirds of the building were destroyed, while some of the surviving stonework was stolen after the war. The chapel's crypt remained intact but it was vandalized when the fort was abandoned after being decommissioned in 1964.

The building remained in ruins until it was reconstructed between 2007 and 2009 as part of a restoration project of the entire fort undertaken by MIDI plc. The crypt was also restored at this point. Today the chapel is listed on the National Inventory of the Cultural Property of the Maltese Islands.

== Architecture ==
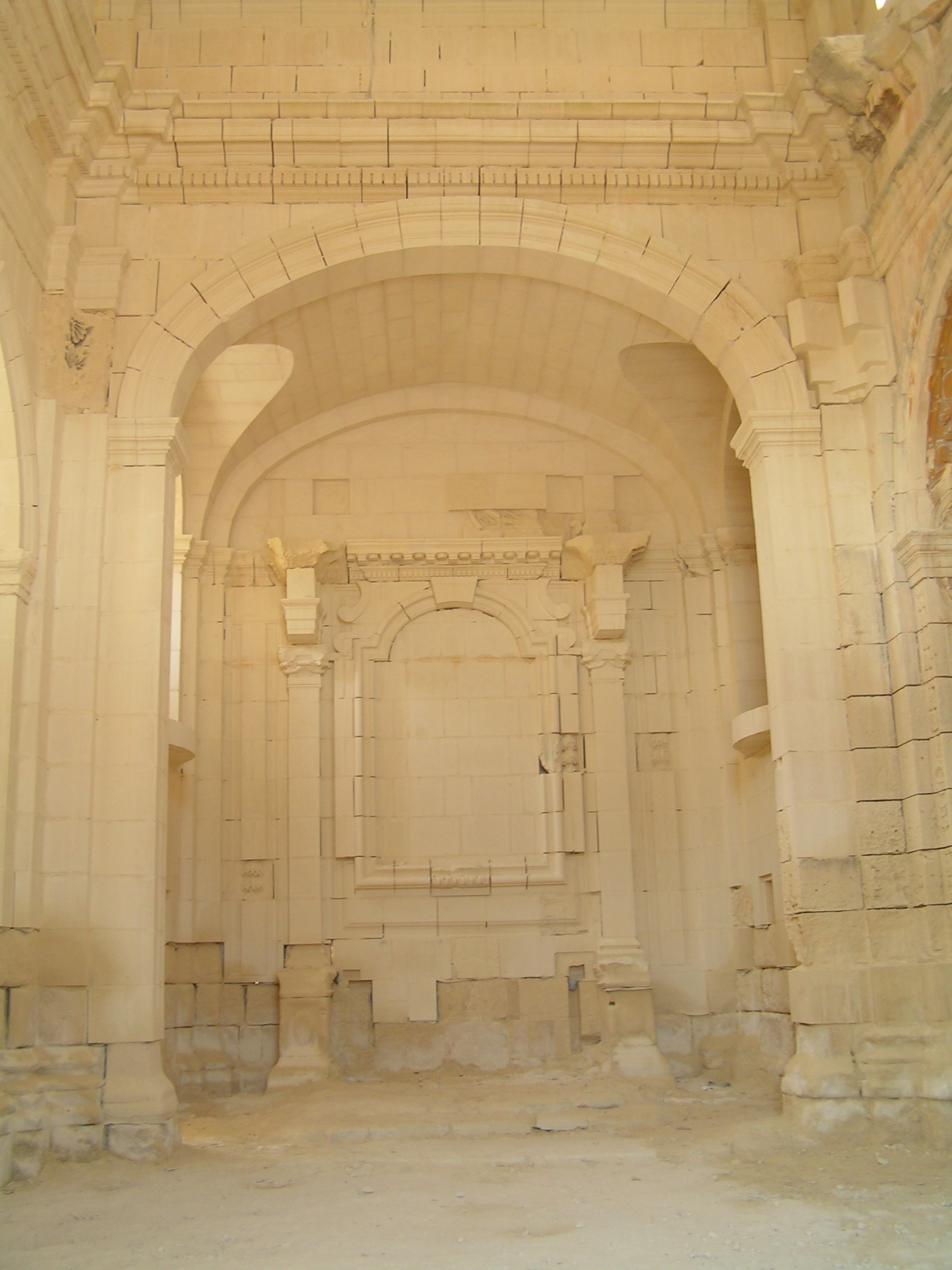
Interior of the chapel in 2009, shortly after reconstruction was completed

The chapel is built in the Baroque style, and it has a rectangular plan with a small dome. It has a classical façade with a central main doorway, four giant Ionic pilasters and two niches which formerly contained statues of saints Anthony of Padua and John the Baptist. The façade is topped by a triangular pediment which contains a defaced escutcheon which formerly contained Vilhena's coat of arms, surrounded by carvings of military paraphernalia. The side elevation of the church is rather plain, containing Ionic pilasters, two doors and five windows.

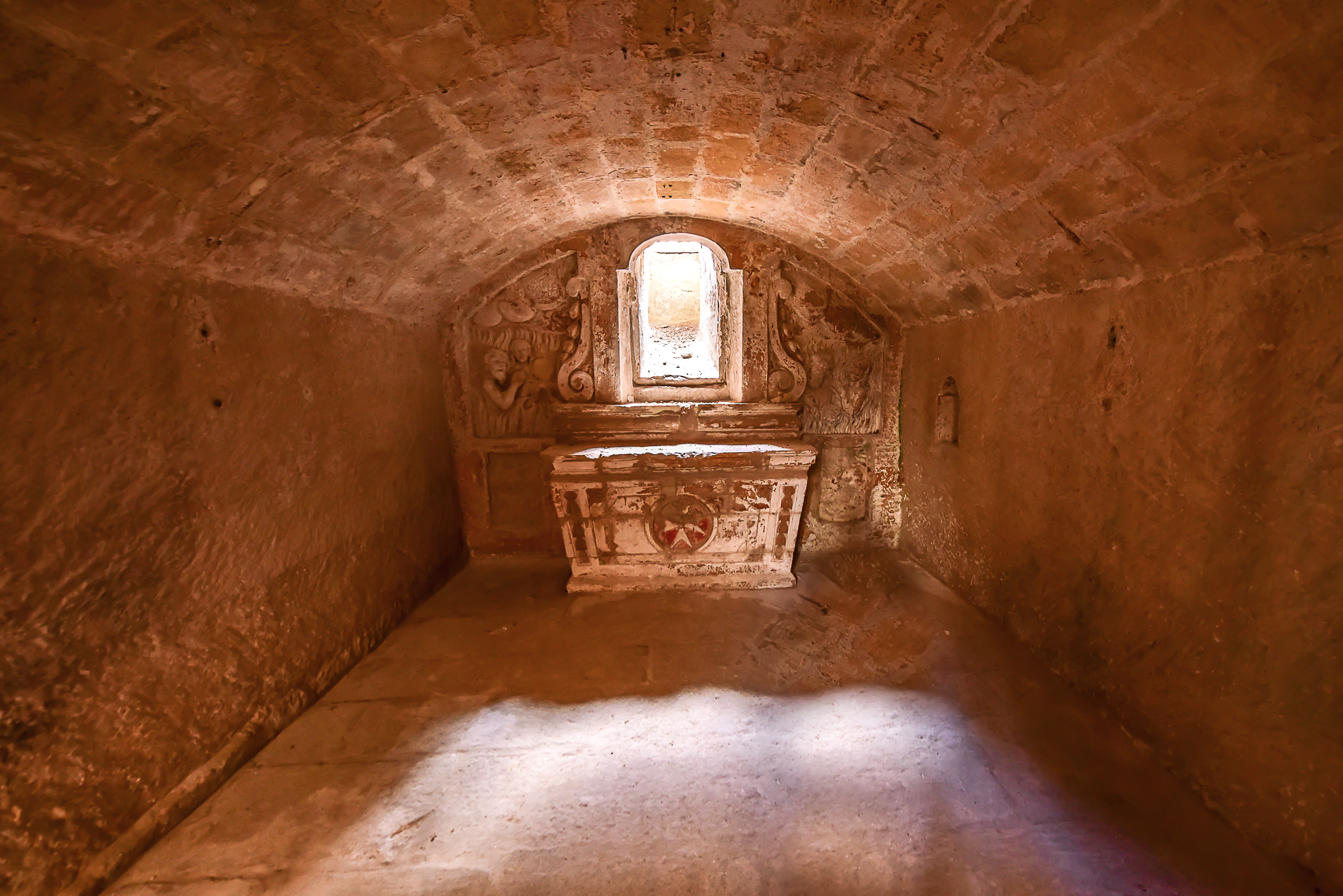
The crypt in 2018

The chapel contains a nave with a main altar and four side altars, and the rear part of the building includes a sacristy. A crypt with a single altar is located beneath the chapel, and the following people are known to have been buried there:

- Charles François de Mondion (1733) – architect and military engineer involved in the fort's design and construction
- Mederico Attard (1754)
- Aloisio de Lucia (1760)
- Carmelo Galea (1771)
- Emmanuel Solano (1803) – the fort's last chaplain

== Artworks and relics ==
The chapel's main altarpiece, which depicts St Anthony of Padua, was relocated to the National Museum of Fine Arts (now MUŻA) in Valletta. Four other paintings from the chapel's secondary altars were destroyed during World War II. These depicted Saint Anne, the Immaculate Conception, Saint Joseph and the Assumption of Mary.

The chapel contained several relics, including the body of St Generoso which was placed within the main altar and a relic of the True Cross which was donated to the chapel by Vilhena.
