= Statue of António Manoel de Vilhena =

Public sculpture in Floriana, Malta

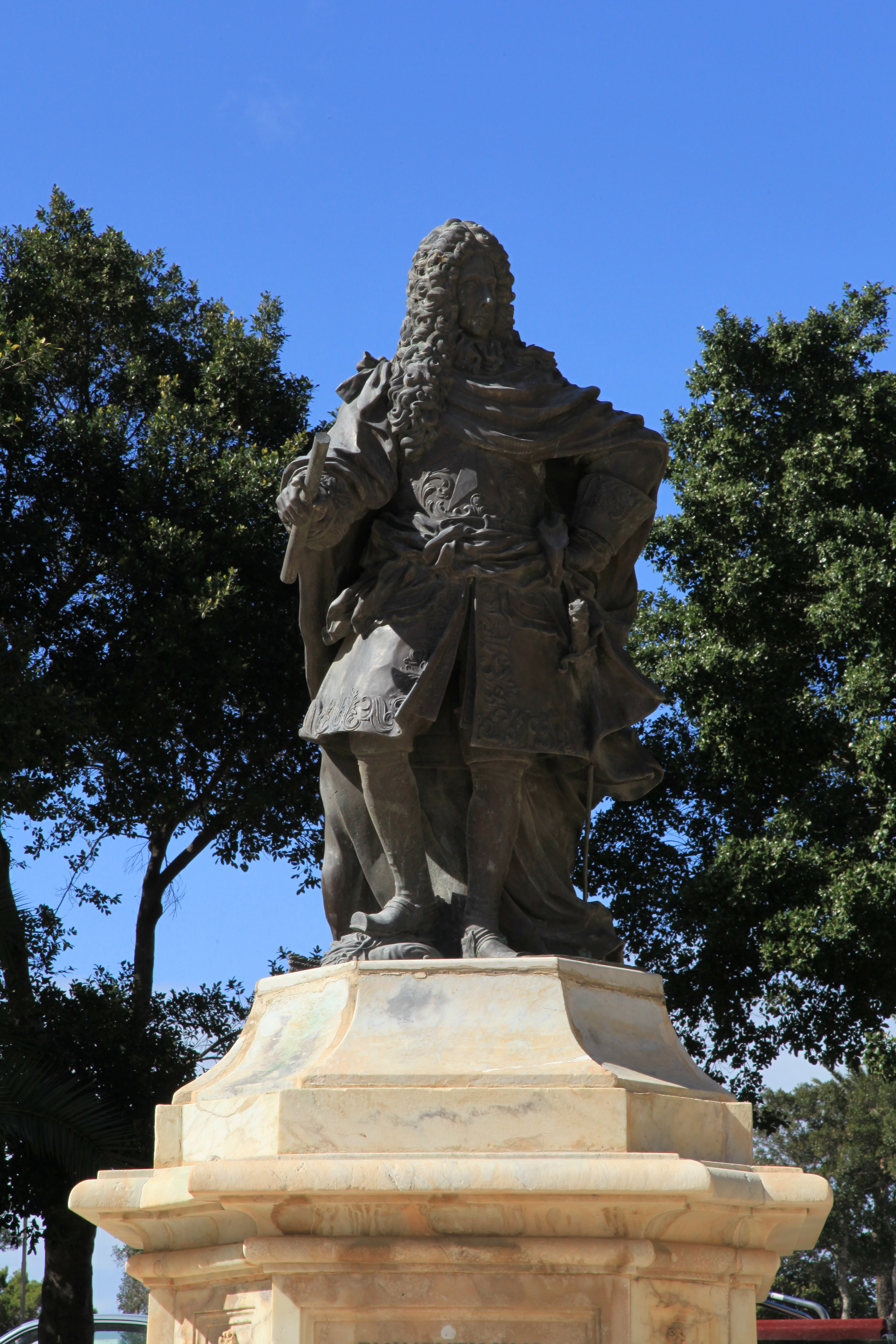
- The statue in 2013
- Artist: Pietro Paolo Troisi (attributed)
- Year: 1736
- Medium: Bronze
- Movement: Baroque
- Subject: António Manoel de Vilhena
- Location: Floriana, Malta; 35°53′34.6″N 14°30′23.0″E

The statue of António Manoel de Vilhena is a life-sized Baroque bronze statue of António Manoel de Vilhena, a Portuguese Grand Master of the Order of St John. Commissioned in 1734 by the knight Felician de Savasse, it was sculpted by Pietro Paolo Troisi and cast by Aloisio Bouchut. In 1736 it was installed at Fort Manoel in Malta, and it was subsequently relocated a number of times. It was moved to Piazza Tesoreria in Valletta in 1858, to the entrance of The Mall gardens in Floriana in 1891, and to its present location at Pope John XXIII Square in Floriana in 1989.

== History ==
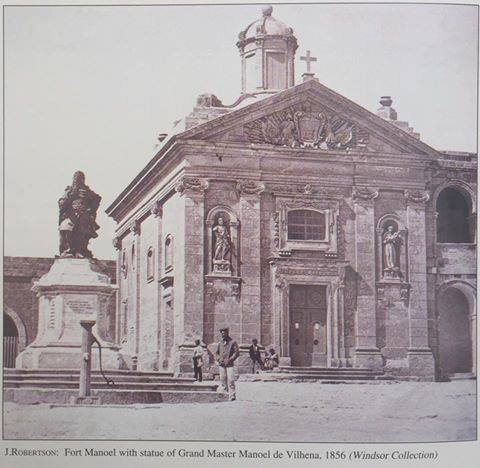
The Vilhena statue at the parade ground of Fort Manoel, where it stood from 1736 to 1858, in an 1856 photograph by James Robertson

The life-sized statue of Grand Master António Manoel de Vilhena was commissioned in 1734 by Felician de Savasse, a French knight of the Order of St John who was seeking the favour of the Grand Master. The statue is attributed to Pietro Paolo Troisi, who might have been appointed as Master of the Mint by Vilhena in 1736 in recognition of his work. The statue was formerly attributed to the Italian sculptor Massimiliano Soldani Benzi, but this is now regarded as unlikely.

The statue was cast in bronze by Aloisio Bouchut (also known as Louis Bouchet) at the foundry of the Order in Malta. It was installed in the parade ground (known as the Gran Piazza or Piazza d'Armi) of Fort Manoel in 1736. The cost was 2159 scudi, 5 tarì and 14 grani, but Savasse only paid Bouchut 100 scudi and left the island as he had financial difficulties. Bouchut tried to acquire the money he was due in a lengthy legal battle, but both Bouchut and Savasse died before the matter was resolved. In 1775, Bouchut's widow was eventually granted 800 scudi as compensation, which were paid for by the Manoel Foundation on the orders of Grand Master Francisco Ximénez de Tejada.

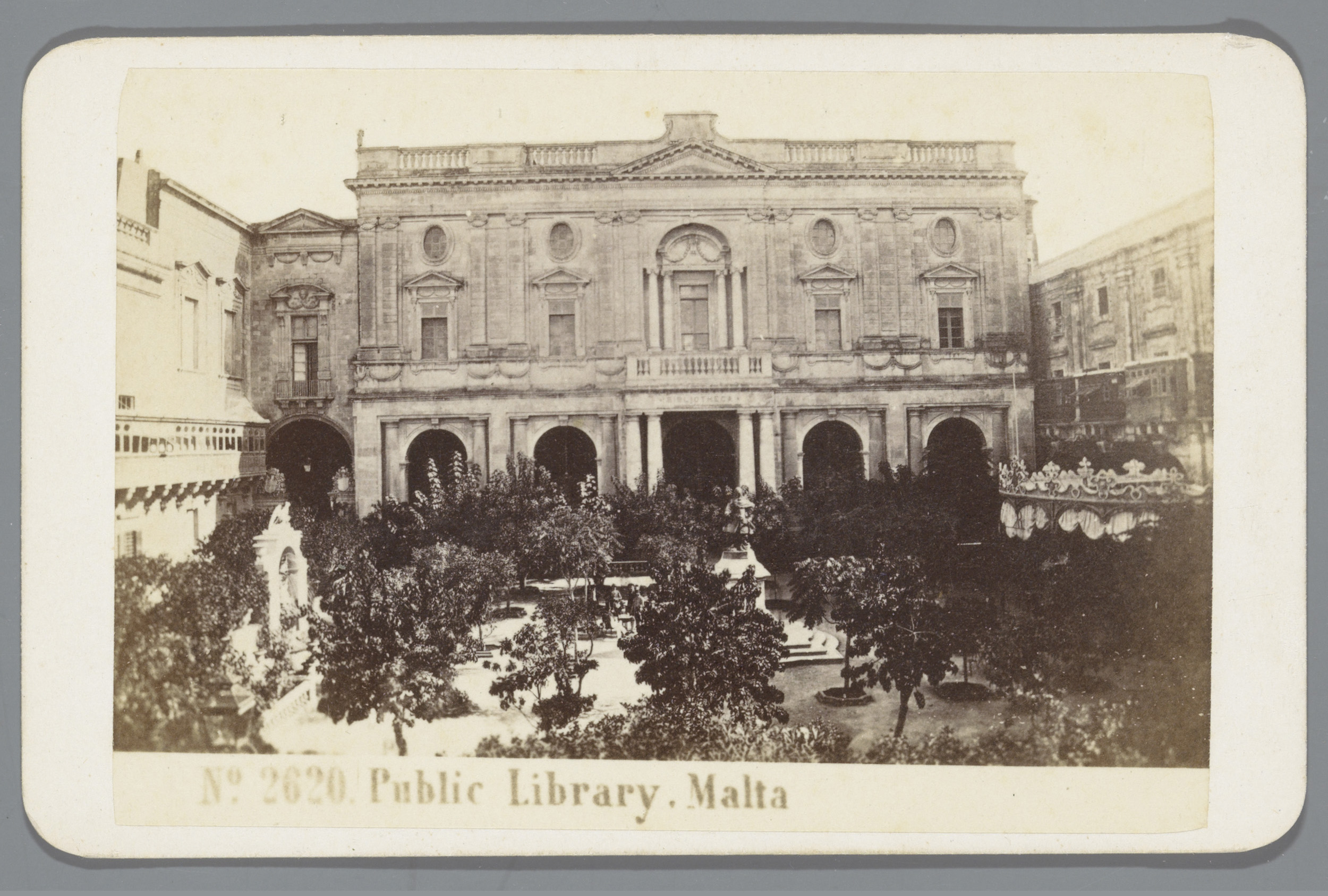
The Vilhena statue at Piazza Tesoreria in Valletta, where it stood from 1858 to 1891, in a c. 1865 photograph by Giorgio Sommer

In 1840, the piazza of Fort Manoel including the Vilhena statue was the subject of the earliest known photographs of Malta. The photographer was the French artist Horace Vernet, and the photos were taken while he was quarantined at the nearby Lazzaretto. It is documented that the photographs were taken in the presence of a group of guests including Governor Henry Bouverie. Today the photos themselves seem to be lost.

In 1858, the statue was relocated from the fort to Piazza Tesoreria in front of the Bibliotheca in Valletta. The relocation was carried out at the initiative of Governor John Le Marchant who wanted to place the statue in a prominent public space. Two commemorative bronze medals which are believed to have been presented by Soldani Benzi to Vilhena were discovered in the statue's base during the relocation.

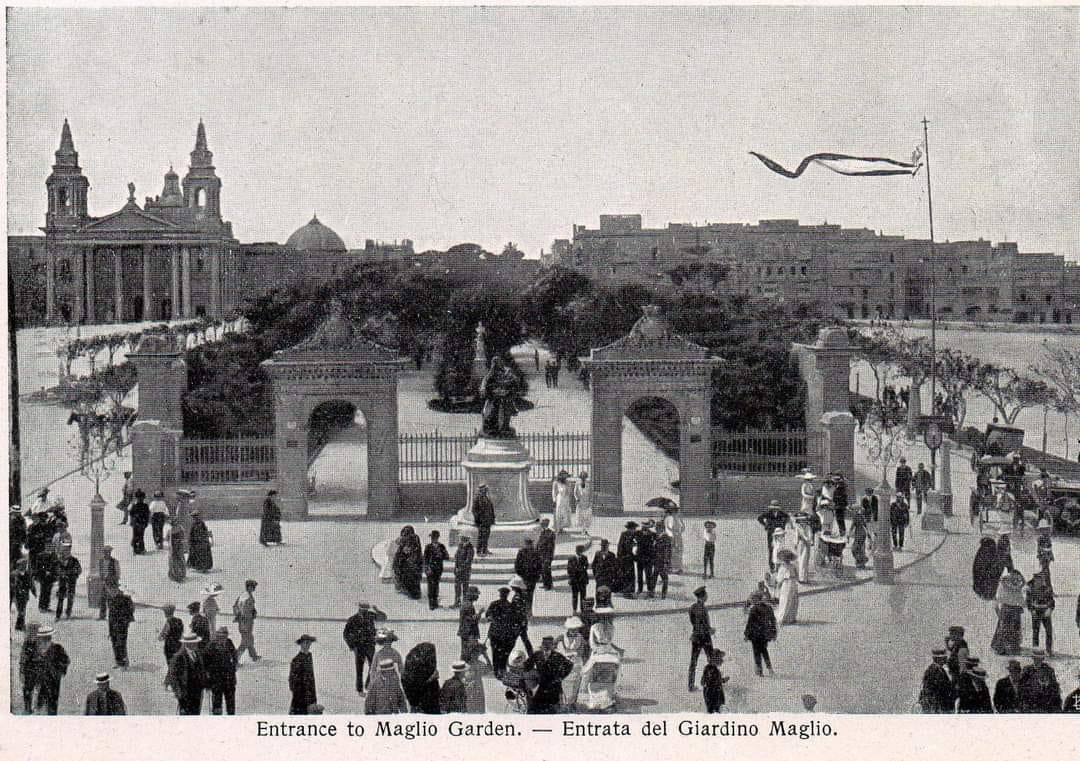
The Vilhena statue at the entrance to the Mall gardens in Floriana, where it stood from 1891 to 1989 (except for a brief period during World War II), in a c. 1920 photograph

To commemorate the Golden Jubilee of Queen Victoria in 1887, it was decided to replace Vilhena's statue at Piazza Tesoreria with a statue of the monarch. This was installed in 1891, and at this point the Grand Master's statue was moved to the entrance of The Mall Gardens in Floriana.

Shortly before or during World War II, the statue was dismantled and relocated slightly outwards from the garden. In 1970 there were proposals to move the statue back to its original location at Fort Manoel, but the plans were not carried out. The statue was relocated once again in 1989 when a monument commemorating the 25th anniversary of Malta's independence was installed near the entrance of the Mall. At this point, Vilhena's statue was moved to Pope John XXIII Square, also in Floriana, where it remains today.

The Malta Environment and Planning Authority scheduled the statue as a Grade 1 monument on 8 May 2012.

== Description ==
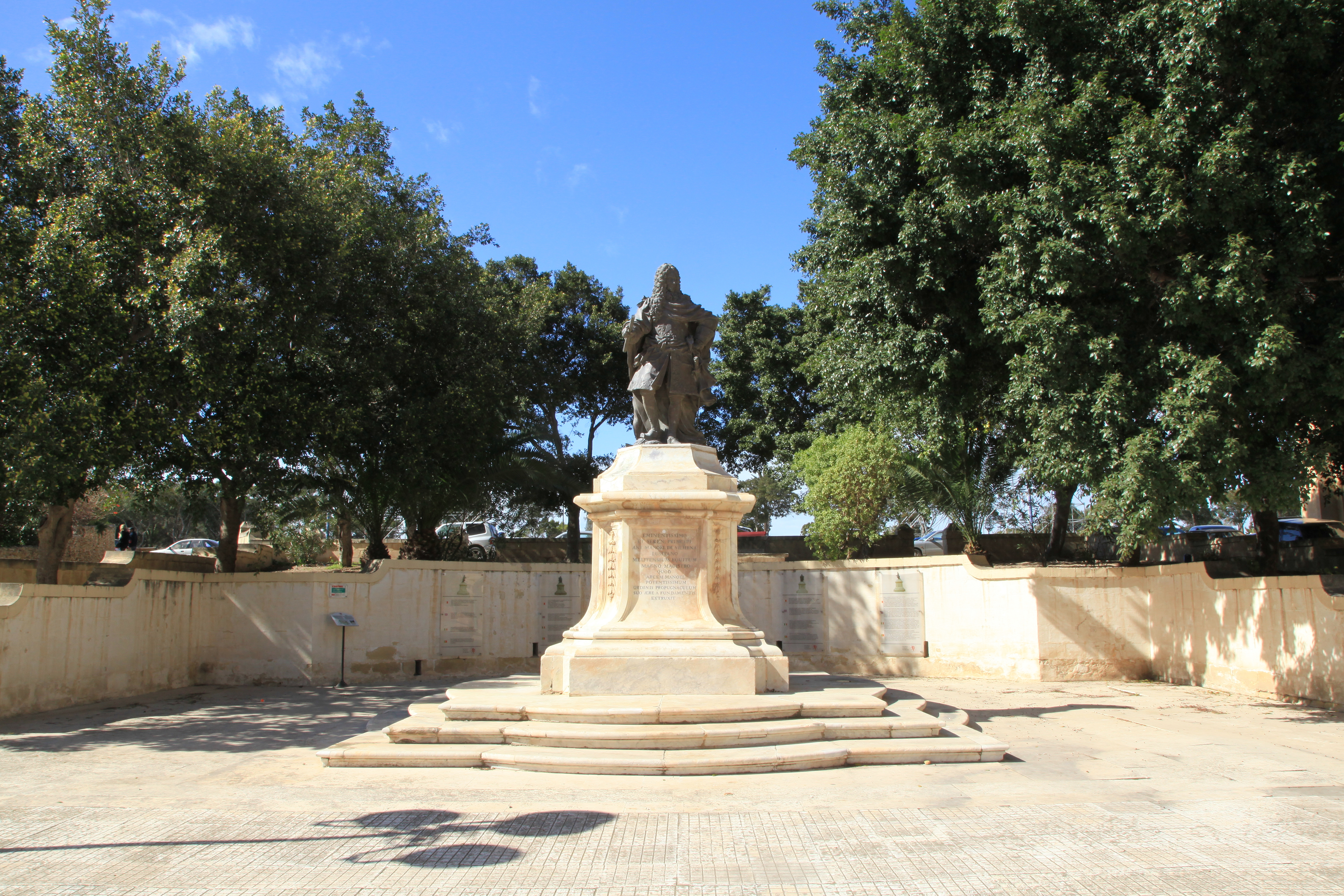
The monument and its pedestal in its present location, photographed in 2013

The bronze statue is regarded as a masterpiece of Baroque sculpture, and it is a life-sized depiction of Grand Master Vilhena in full regalia. He is shown standing in a majestic pose, wearing a wig and clothed with a coat, breastplate, cape and boots. The statue is placed on a marble pedestal.

== Legacy ==
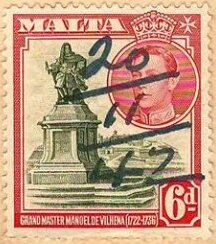
The statue as depicted on a 1938 Malta postage and revenue stamp

In 1938, the statue was depicted on a 6d Malta stamp along with Fort Manoel and the then-reigning British monarch George VI. In 1948 this stamp was reissued with a Self-Government overprint and it remained in regular use until the mid-1950s.

== See also ==
- Lion Fountain (Floriana)
