= Lion Fountain (Floriana) =

- Il-funtana tal-iljun (Maltese)
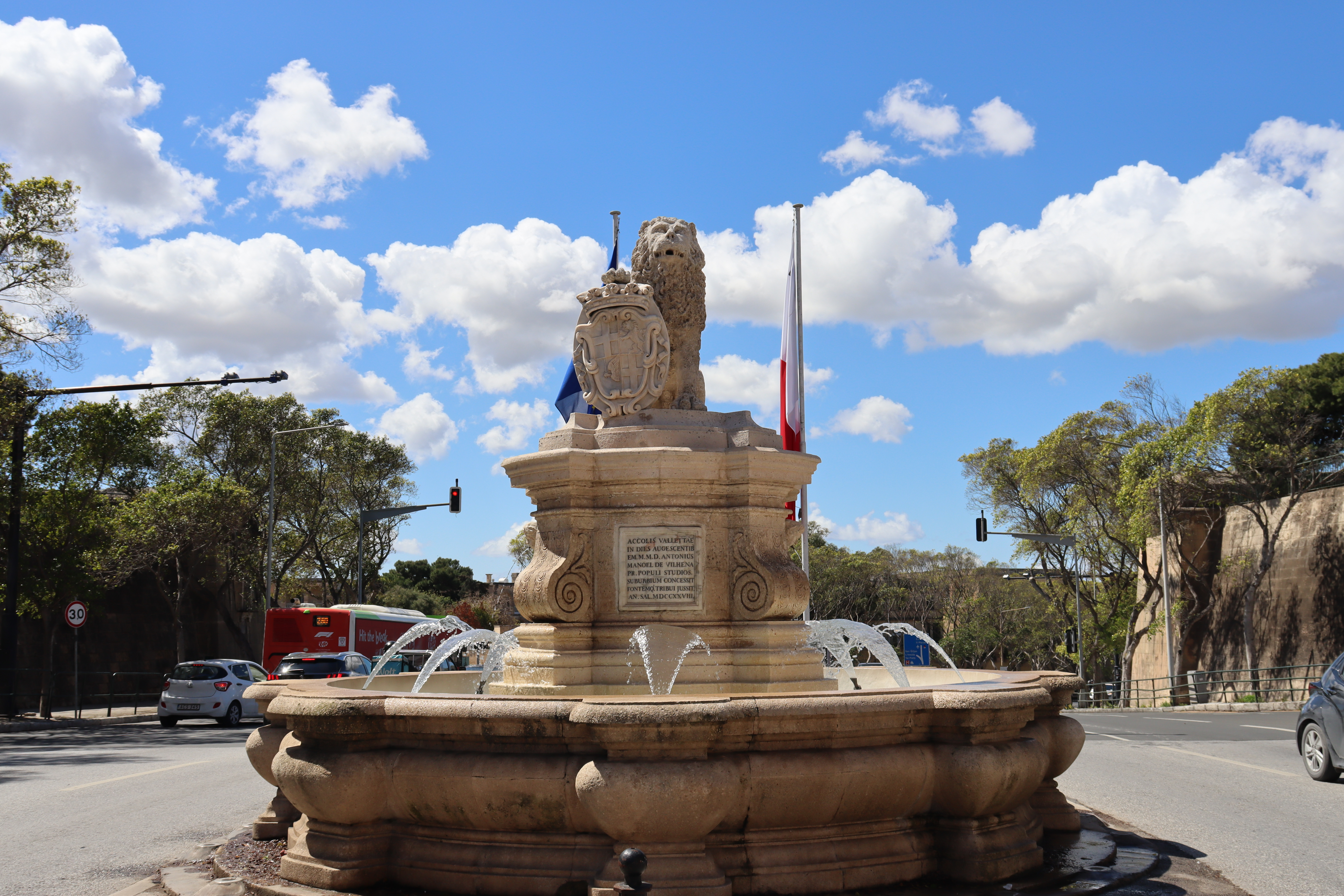
- The Lion Fountain in 2026
- Completion date: 1728
- Type: Public fountain
- Movement: Baroque
- Subject: Lion
- Location: Floriana, Malta; 35°53′28.0″N 14°30′16.9″E

The Lion Fountain (Maltese: Il-funtana tal-iljun), also known as the Vilhena Fountain, is a Baroque fountain located in St Anne Square in Floriana, Malta. It was installed in 1728 by Grand Master António Manoel de Vilhena, and it was relocated a few metres from its original location in the 1950s.

== History ==
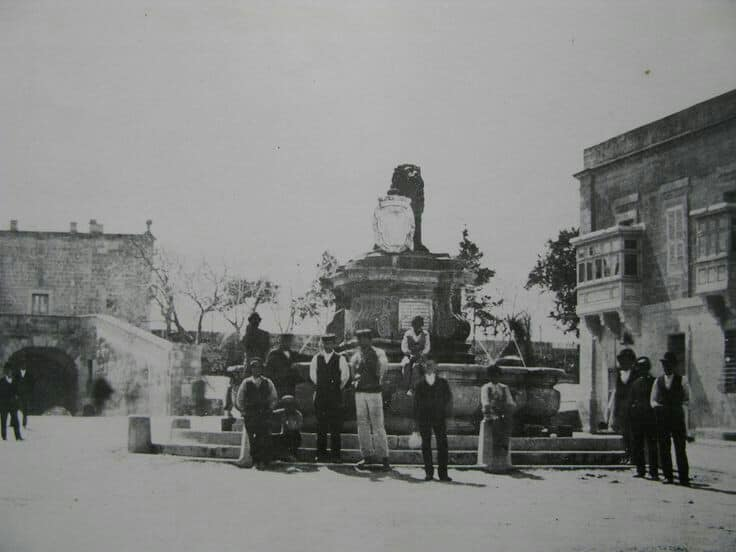
The Lion Fountain in its original location in the 19th century, with the rear of the now-demolished St Anne's Gate visible to the left

The Lion Fountain was built in 1728 by Grand Master António Manoel de Vilhena, according to a commemorative inscription on the fountain itself. It was installed shortly after Vilhena had declared Floriana a suburb of Valletta. It was supplied by water from the Wignacourt Aqueduct, and for many years it was the only source of water for the area's inhabitants.

During World War II, in order to prevent it from being damaged from aerial bombardment, the lion sculpture was moved to a nearby arcade and it was encased in stone. After the war it was temporarily stored in a nearby garage. The fountain itself was removed in 1956 while St Anne Square was being realigned. In 1958, the fountain was reconstructed a few metres away from its original location, and the lion was reinstalled on the night of 31 December 1958 to 1 January 1959.

The fountain was included in the 1932 Antiquities Protection List, and on 22 December 2009 it was scheduled as a Grade 1 national monument by the Malta Environment and Planning Authority.

== Description ==
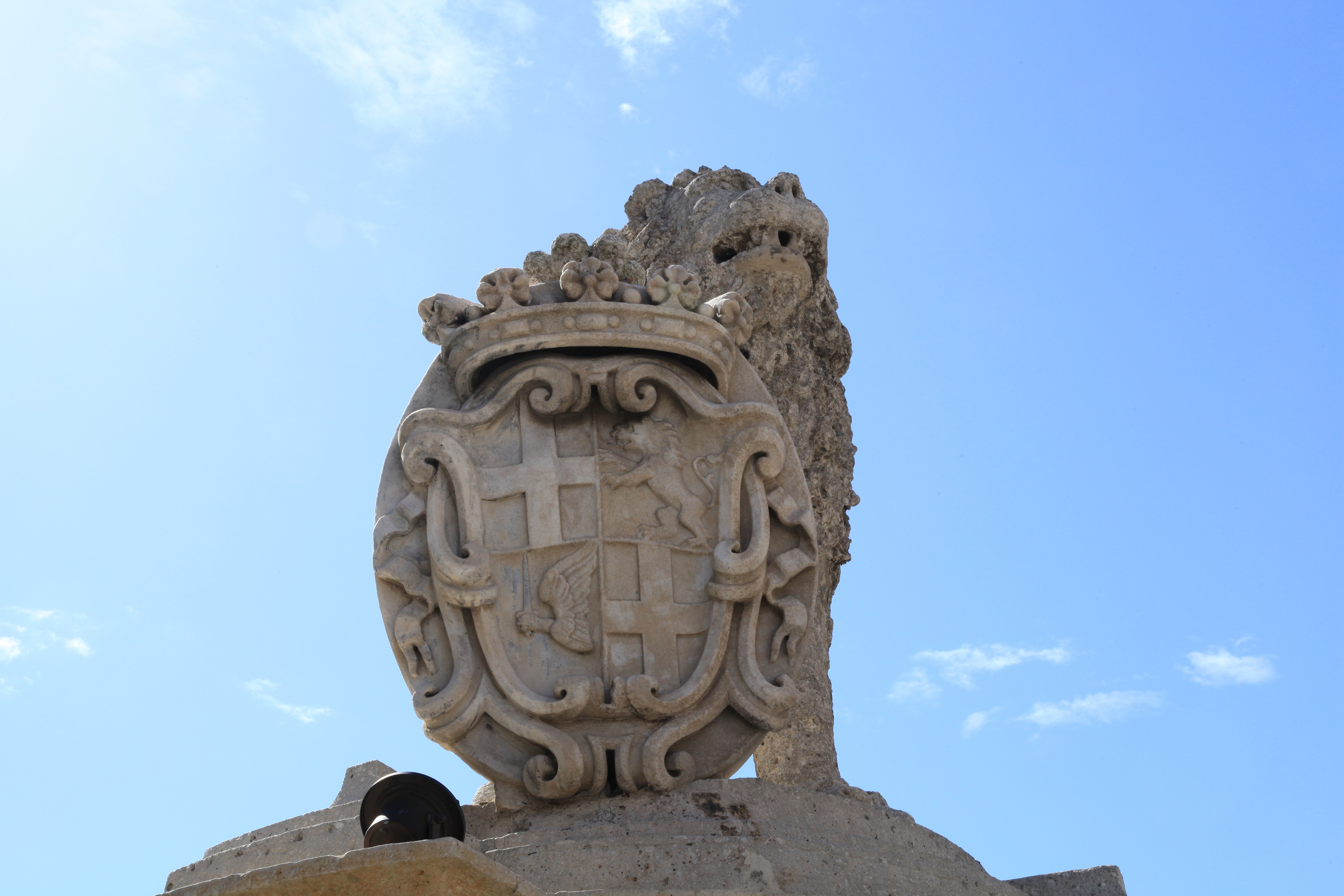
Vilhena's coat of arms

The Baroque fountain consists of a basin which contains a plinth that is topped by a sculpture of a seated lion. The lion was a heraldic symbol in Vilhena's coat of arms, and it later became a symbol of Floriana, forming the basis of the town's coat of arms. In the fountain, the animal is depicted as holding an escutcheon with Vilhena's coat of arms. Water flows through spouts located in the mouths of sculpted cherubs located within the fountain's plinth.

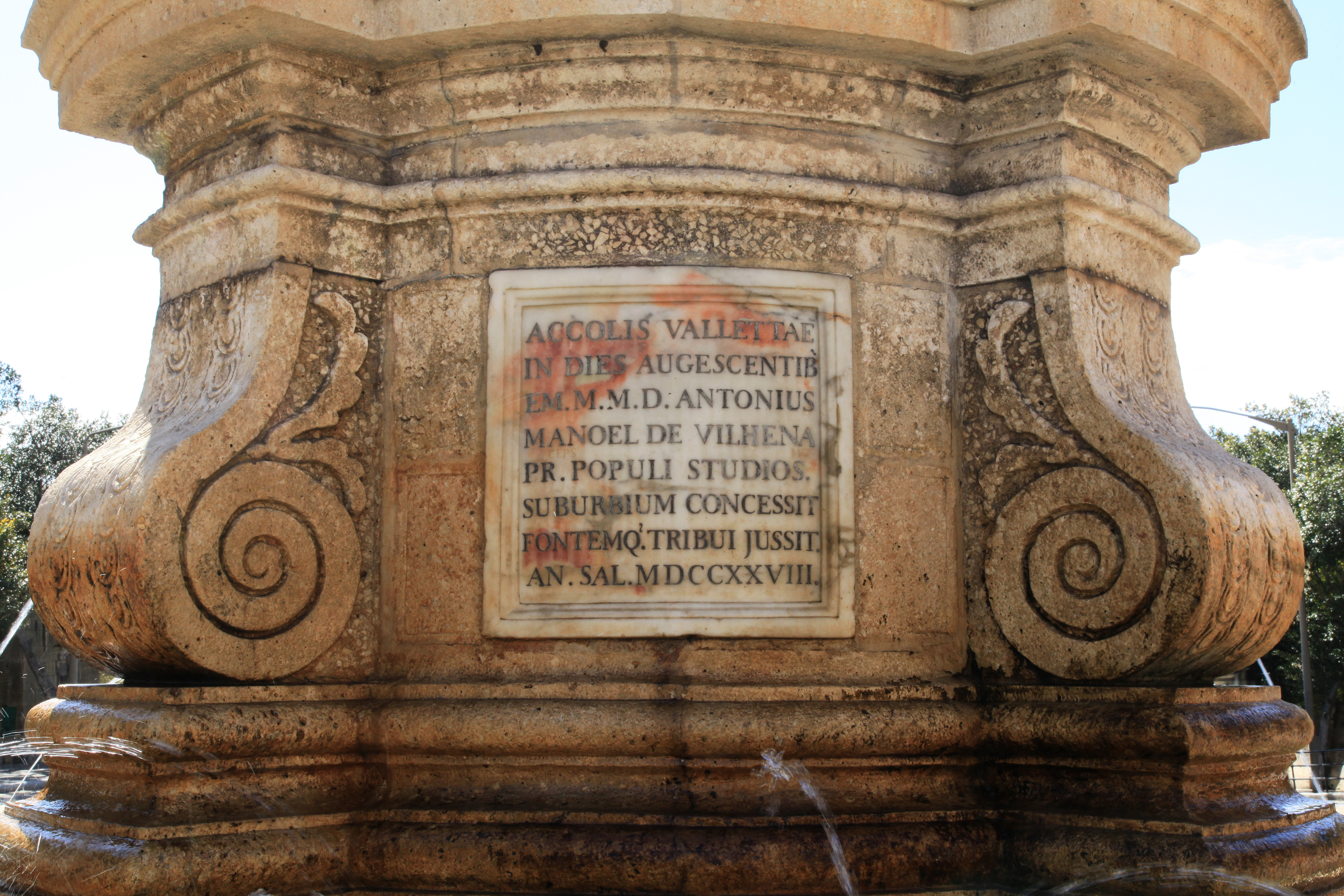
Latin inscription on the fountain

The plinth contains a Latin inscription which reads:

ACCOLIS VALLETTAE

IN DIES AUGESCENTIB
EM.M.M.D. ANTONIUS
MANOEL DE VILHENA
PR. POLULI STUDIOS.
SUBURBIUM CONCESSIT
FONTEMQ. TRIBUI JUSSIT.
AN. SAL. MDCCXVIII.
(meaning To the increasing population of this suburb, Grand Master Don António Manoel de Vilhena, who holds the inhabitants so close to his heart, decreed that this Fountain is erected – 1728)

== Legacy ==
The fountain was depicted on a €0.06 postage stamp issued by MaltaPost on 27 March 2013.

== See also ==
- Statue of António Manoel de Vilhena
- Fuq l-Iljuni
