= Ramón Despuig =

Spanish knight

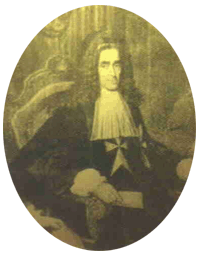

Grand Master of the Order of Saint John
- In office 16 December 1736 – 15 January 1741
- Monarch: King Charles V
- Preceded by: António Manoel de Vilhena
- Succeeded by: Manuel Pinto da Fonseca

Personal details
- Born: 1670 Mallorca, Aragon
- Died: 15 January 1741 (aged 70–71) Malta
- Resting place: St. John's Co-Cathedral

Military service
- Allegiance: (Sovereign Military Order of Malta) Order of Saint John

Fra' Ramón Despuig y Martínez de Marcilla (Catalan: Ramón Despuig i Martínez de Marcilla; Catalan pronunciation: [rəˈmon dəsˈputʃ]; 1670, – 15 January 1741) was a Spanish knight of Aragon who served as the 67th Grand Master of the Order of Malta from 1736 until his death. He was succeeded by Manuel Pinto da Fonseca. During his reign, the legislation of the small state was renewed and the Cathedral of St. John in Valletta was reformed. Several vessels of the Algerian Navy were also captured by the Order's galleys during his reign.

Despuig Bastion, which is part of the fortifications of Mdina, was built between 1739 and 1746 and was named after the Grand Master. He died in 1741.

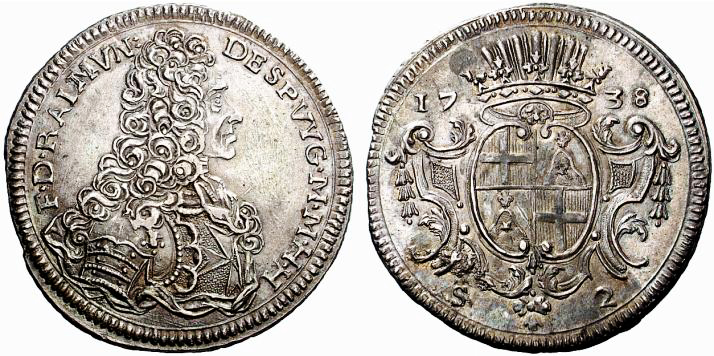
2 scudi coin of GM Despuig, 1738

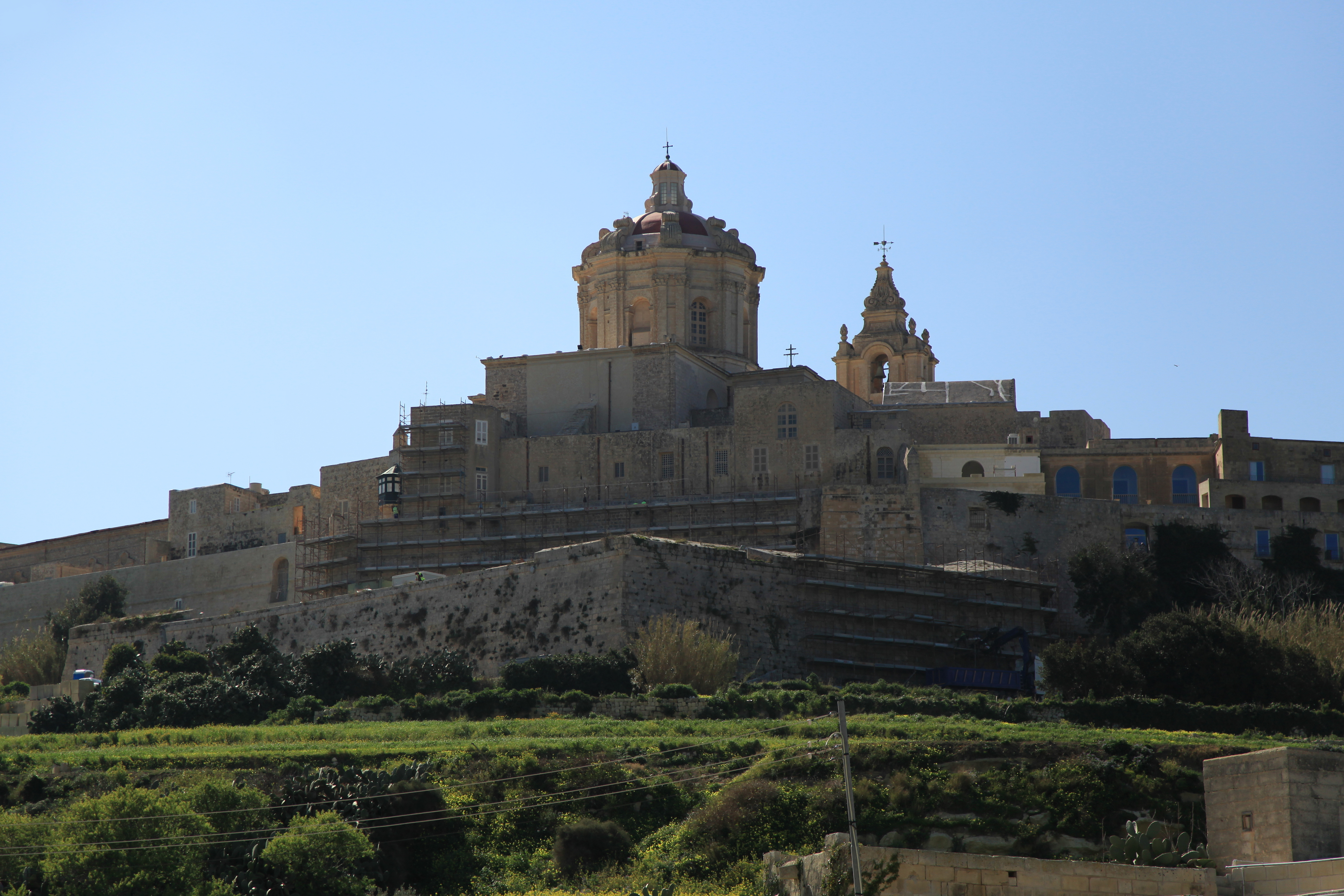
Despuig Bastion, Mdina

Preceded by António Manoel de Vilhena	Grand Master of the Knights Hospitaller; 1736–1741	Succeeded by Manuel Pinto da Fonseca
