= Marc'Antonio Zondadari =

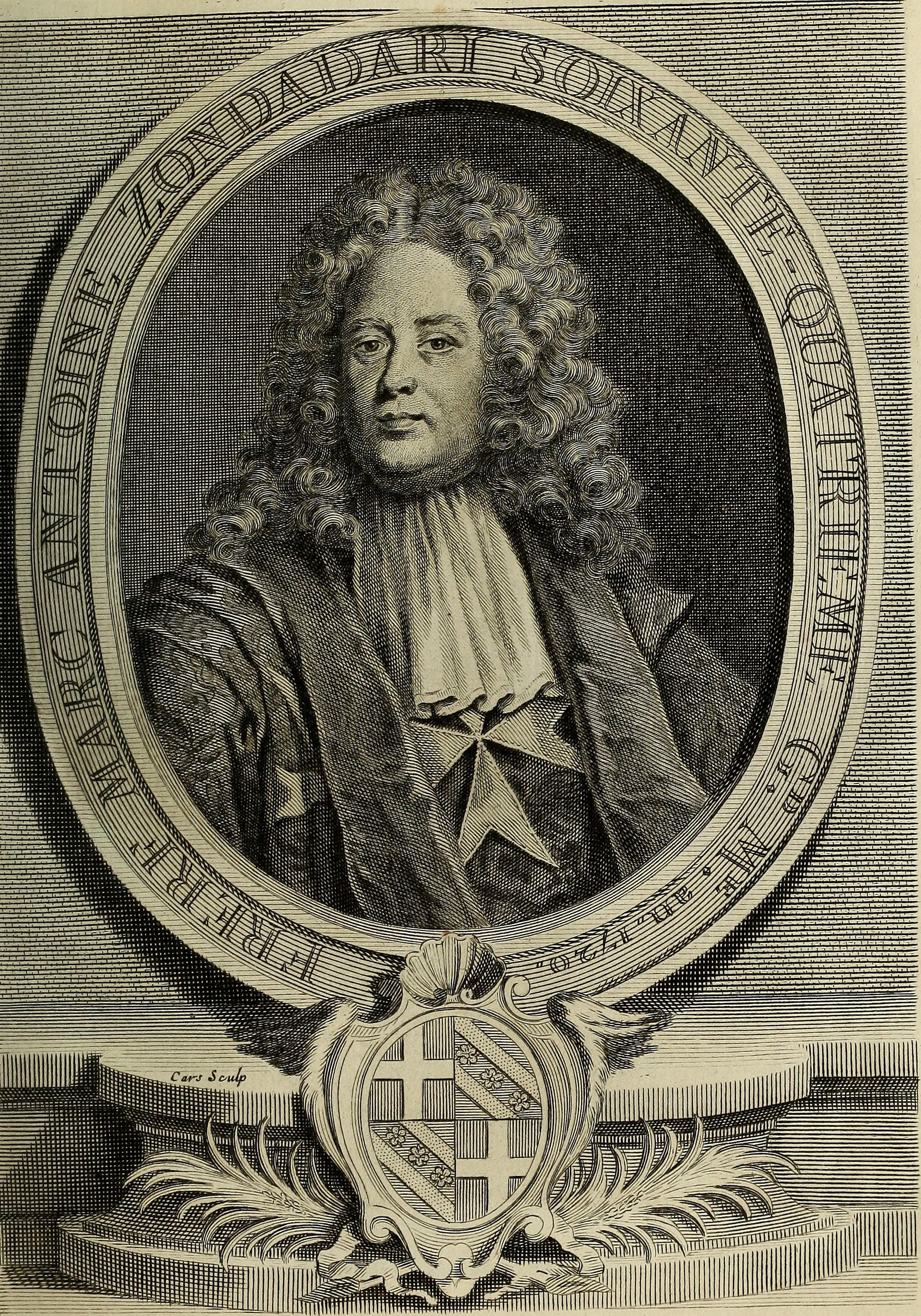

Grand Master of the Order of Saint John
- In office 13 January 1720 – 16 June 1722
- Monarchs: King Victor Amadeus; King Charles IV
- Preceded by: Ramon Perellos y Roccaful
- Succeeded by: António Manoel de Vilhena

Personal details
- Born: 26 November 1658 Siena, Tuscany (modern Italy)
- Died: 16 June 1722 (aged 63) Malta
- Resting place: St. John's Co-Cathedral

Military service
- Allegiance: (Sovereign Military Order of Malta) Order of Saint John

Fra' Marc'Antonio Zondadari (26 November 1658 − 16 June 1722), from Siena, was the 65th Prince and Grand Master of the Order of Malta (known also as the Gerosolimitani), from 1720, after the death of the Aragonese Fra Ramon Perellos y Roccaful, till his own death in 1722.

== Biography ==
Zondadari was born in Siena; his mother was of aristocratic Chigi surname, and he studied in a college at Parma. From 1702 onwards Zondadari lived in Palazzo Carniero in Valletta, which later became known as Auberge de Bavière.

Although his reign only lasted for two years, he was popular with the Maltese. During his reign Carnival traditions were strengthened with the establishment of the Kukkanja.

His body is buried in a magnificent monument by Massimiliano Soldani Benzi in the St. John's Co-Cathedral while his heart was buried in his native Siena, much to the dismay of the Maltese. This monument is baroque work of art in bronze and marble which shows the Grand Master reclining. This is the only monument found in nave of the church because it did not fit in the chapel of the langue of Italy.

== Gallery ==
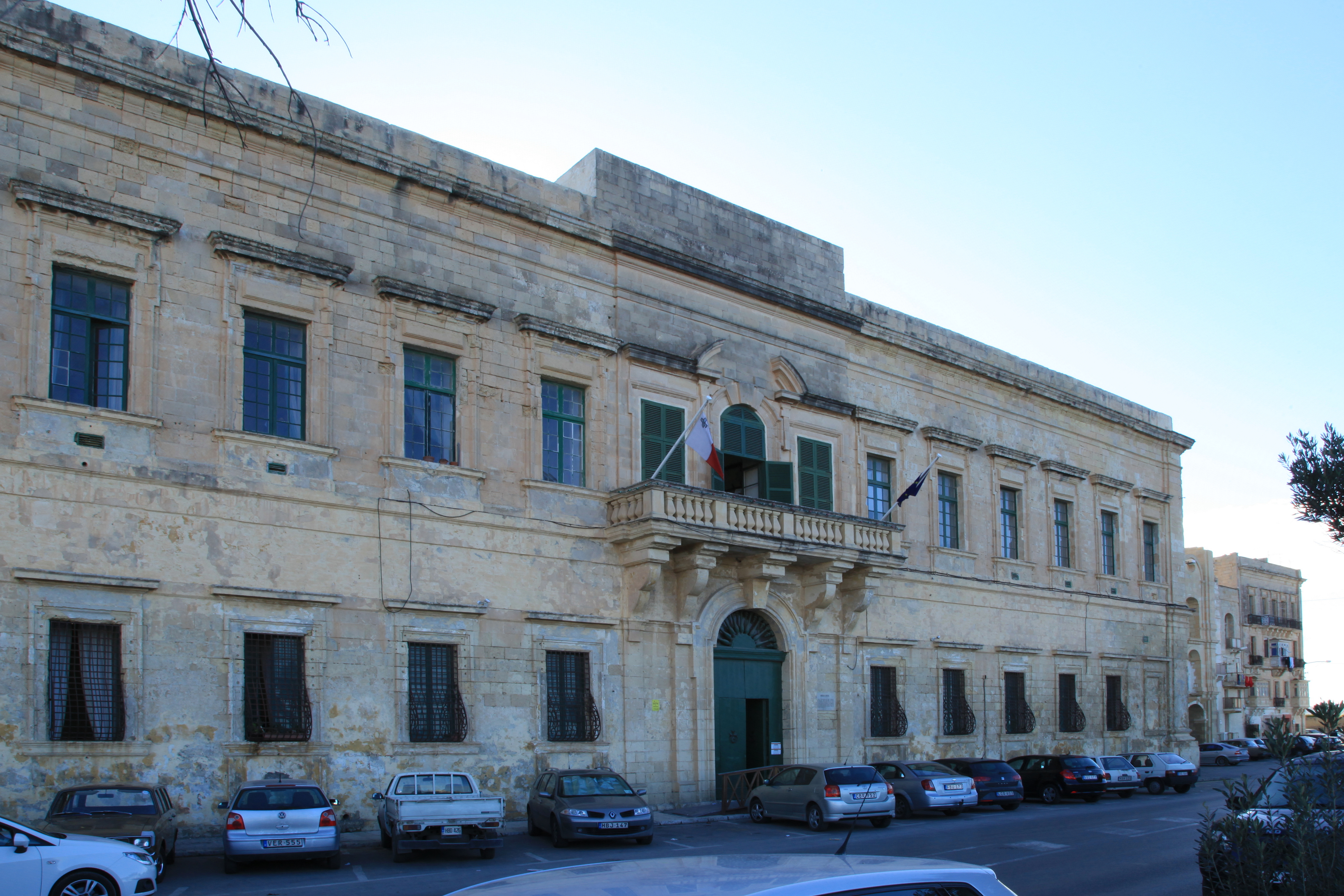
Palazzo Carniero, where Zondadari lived from 1702 to 1722

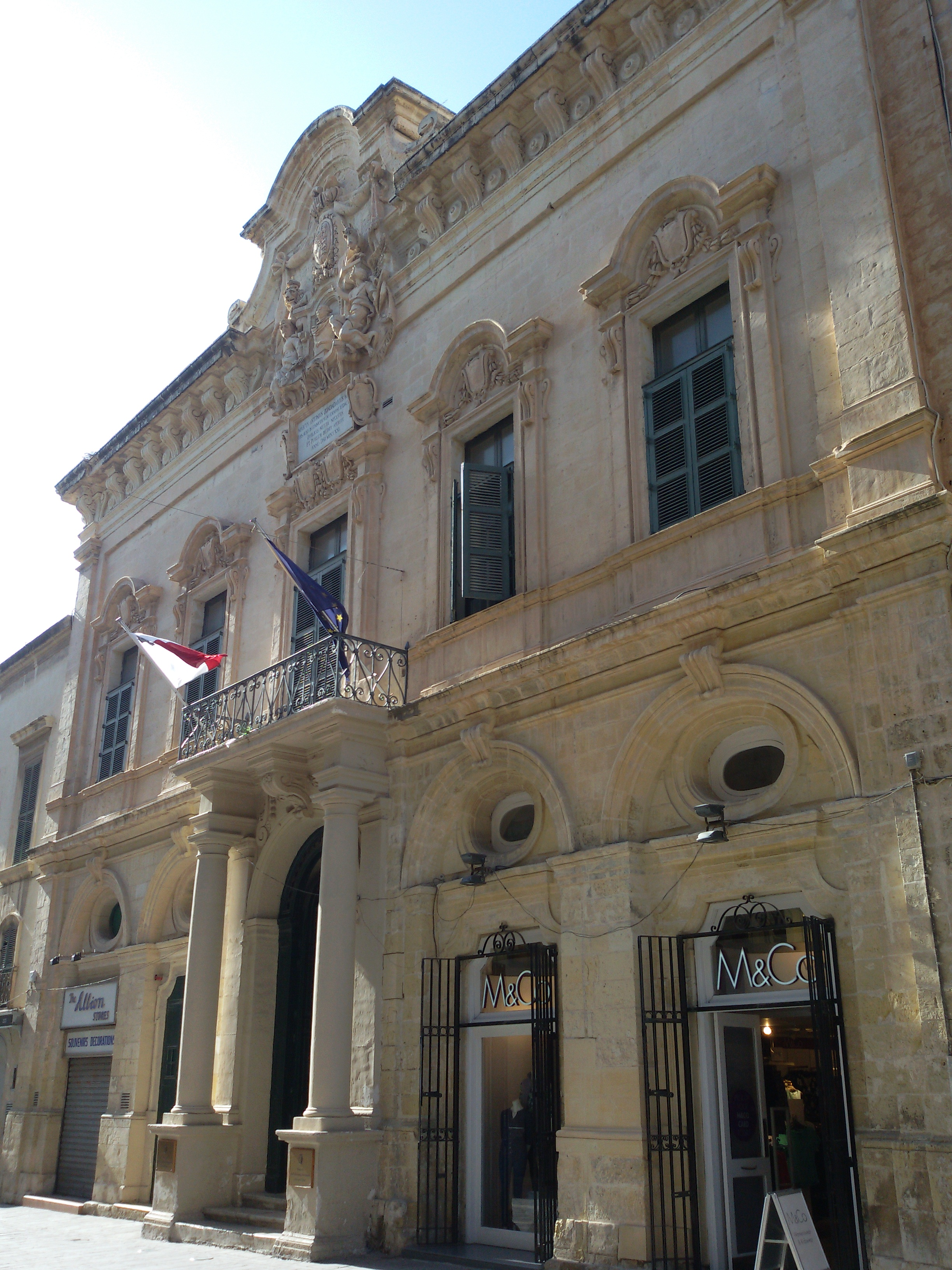
The Banca Giuratale, which was reconstructed by Zondadari in 1721

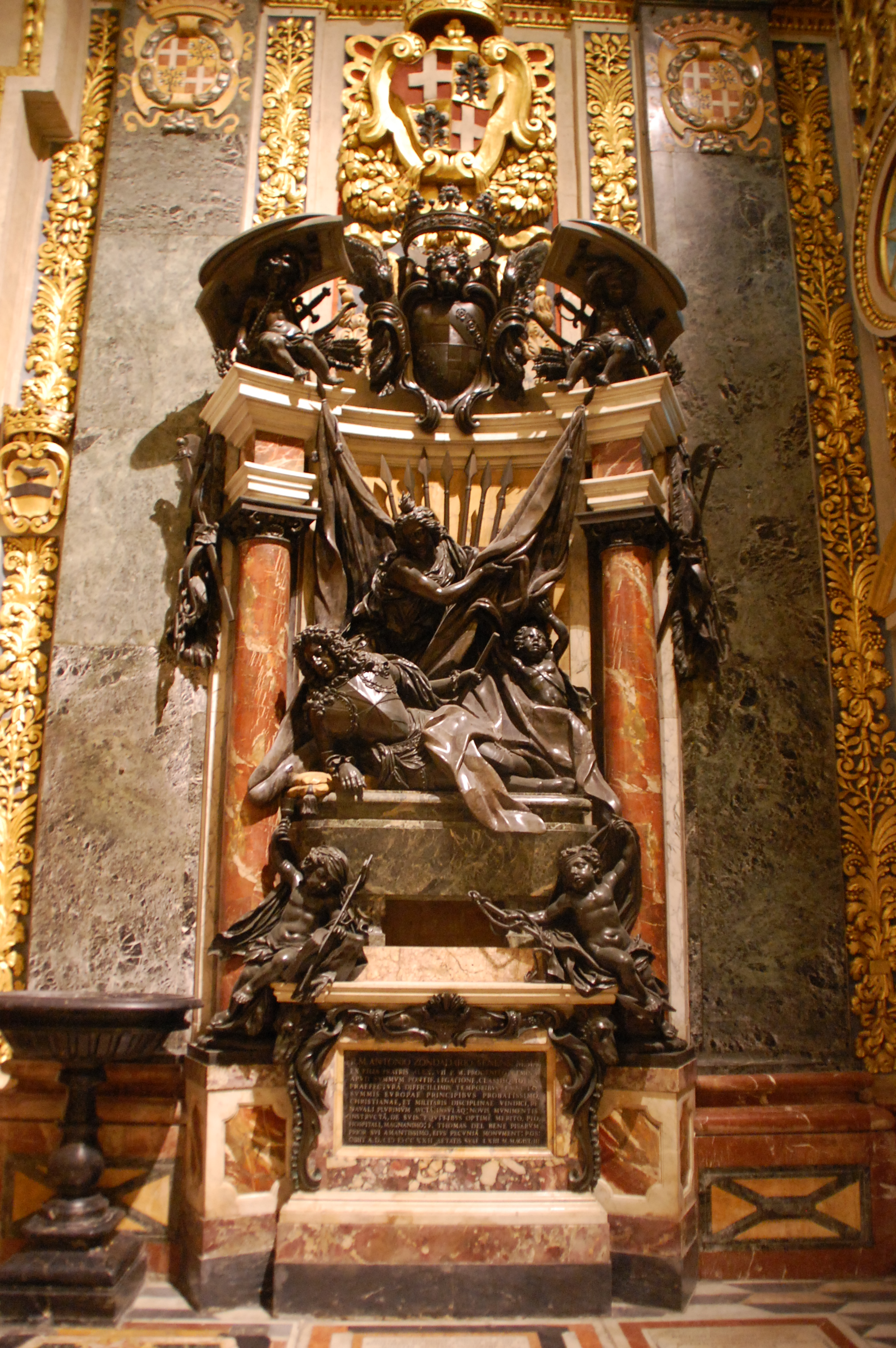
Funerary monument of Zondadari in the nave of St. John's Co-Cathedral

Preceded by Ramon Perellos y Roccaful	Grand Master of the Knights Hospitaller; 1720–1722	Succeeded by Antonio Manoel de Vilhena
