= Maltese scudo =

Currency of the Sovereign Military Order of Malta

Scudo maltese (Italian); Skud Malti (Maltese)
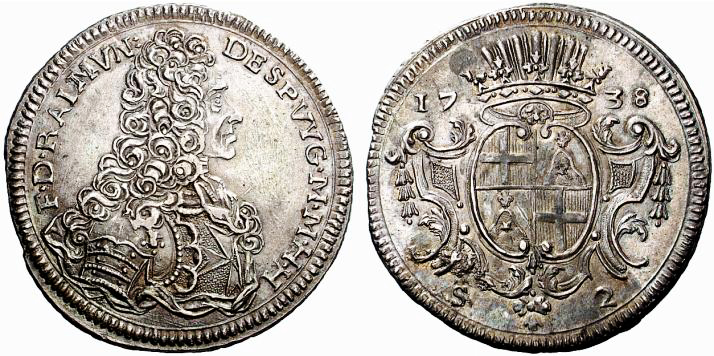
- Two Scudi silver coin of Ramon Despuig, 1738

ISO 4217
- Code: none

Unit
- Plural: scudi

Denominations
- Subunit
- 1/12: tarì
- 1/240: grano
- 1/1440: picciolo
- Plural
- tarì: tarì
- grano: grani
- picciolo: piccioli
- Coins: 15 piccioli 1, 5, 10 grani 1, 2, 4, 6, 8, 9, 12, 15, 16, 30 tarì 1, 2, 5, 10, 20 scudi

Demographics
- User(s): (Sovereign Military Order of Malta) Sovereign Military Order of Malta; Previously: (Sovereign Military Order of Malta) Hospitaller Rhodes (1318–1522) (Sovereign Military Order of Malta) Hospitaller Malta (1530–1798) (France) French Malta (1798–1800) (Kingdom of the Two Sicilies) Independent Gozo (1798–1801) (United Kingdom) Malta Protectorate (1800–1813); Crown Colony of Malta (1813–1825/1886)

Valuation
- Pegged with: euro €0.24 = 1 scudo

The scudo (plural scudi) is the official currency of the Sovereign Military Order of Malta and was the currency of Malta during the rule of the Order over Malta, which ended in 1798. It is subdivided into 12 tarì (singular tarì), each of 20 grani (singular grano) with 6 piccioli (singular picciolo) to the grano. It is pegged to the euro (at a rate of 1 scudo to €0.24, or €1 = 4 scudi 2 tarì).

== History ==
The scudo was first minted in Rhodes in 1318. By 1500, the coins had the distinctive characteristics of a cross and the Order's and Grandmaster's coat of arms on one side, and the head of St. John the Baptist on the other. The scudo was first minted in Malta during the reign of Piero de Ponte. The quality of the coins improved, especially during the reign of António Manoel de Vilhena in the early 18th century. At some points in time, foreign coinage was allowed to circulate in Malta alongside the scudo, including Spanish dollars, Venetian lira, Louis d'or and other currencies.

During the French occupation of Malta in 1798, the French authorities melted down some of the silver from the island's churches and struck it into 15 and 30 tarì coins from the 1798 dies of Grandmaster Hompesch. After the Maltese rebellion, gold and silver ingots were stamped with a face value in grani, tarì and scudi and they briefly circulated as coinage in Valletta and the surrounding area.

The daily wage of the farm labourer around the beginning of the 1800s was 6¾ pence. At the time, the British pound sterling was subdivided into 20 shillings, each of 12 (old) pence, making it a total of 240 pence (see Sterling prior to decimalisation), which was also equivalent to 12 scudi, meaning that one scudo was equivalent to 20 pence. Hence, a farm labourer would need to work roughly three days to earn a scudo.

The scudo continued to circulate on the island of Malta, which had become a British colony, along with some other currencies until they were all replaced by sterling in 1825, at a rate of £1 to 12 scudi (or 1 scudo = 1s. 8d.) using British coinage. Despite this, some scudi remained in use, and the last coins were withdrawn from circulation and demonetized in November 1886. 1 scudo in 1886 had the spending power equivalent to £3.82 or €4.35 in 2011. The present-day Republic of Malta adopted the decimal Maltese pound in 1972 and the euro in 2008.

The SMOM, which is now based in Rome, has issued souvenir coins denominated in grani, tarì and scudi since 1961. The 1961 issues were minted in Rome, while mints in Paris and Arezzo were used in 1962 and 1963. From 1964 onwards, coins were minted in the Order's own mint.

The scudo was also the currency used on the Order's stamps from 1961 to 2005, when the euro began to be used.

== Coins ==
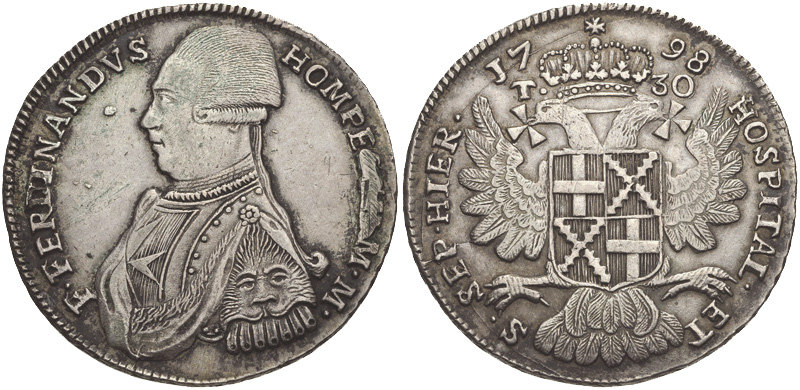
30 tarì coin of Grandmaster Hompesch minted during the French occupation of Malta in 1798

Coins were issued in denominations of 1, 2 1/2, 5 and 10 grani, 1, 2, 4, and 6 tarì, 1, 1 1/4, 1 1/3, 2, 2 1/2, 5, 10 and 20 scudi. The 1, 2 1/2, 5 and 10 grani as well as the 1 tarì were minted in copper, with the 2 1/2 grani denominated as 15 piccoli. The 2, 4 and 6 tarì, 1, 1 1/4, 1 1/3, 2 and 2 1/2 scudi were silver coins, with the 1 1/4, 1 1/3 and 2 1/2 scudi denominated as 15, 16 and 30 tarì. The 5, 10, and 20 scudi coins were gold.

Coins minted today include bronze 10 grani, silver 9 tarì, 1 and 2 scudi and gold 5 and 10 scudi.

In 2011, a gold coin of António Manoel de Vilhena, minted in 1725, sold for US$340,000.

== Legacy ==
In the Maltese language, several proverbs mention the Maltese scudo. These include:

Maltese Proverb	Literal English Translation	Meaning
Ħabib fis-suq aħjar minn mitt skud fis-senduq	A friend in the market is better than a hundred scudi in the chest	A friend is worth more than anything
Aħjar skud fil-but minn mija fis-senduq.	It's better to have a scudo in the pocket than a hundred in the chest	It's better to be sure of something than unsure of many things
Aħjar disa’ rbajja’ u rieqed minn skud u mqajjem	It's better to have nine quarters and be asleep than a scudo and be awake	The lazy will prefer to work less for less money
