= Tarì =

Currency

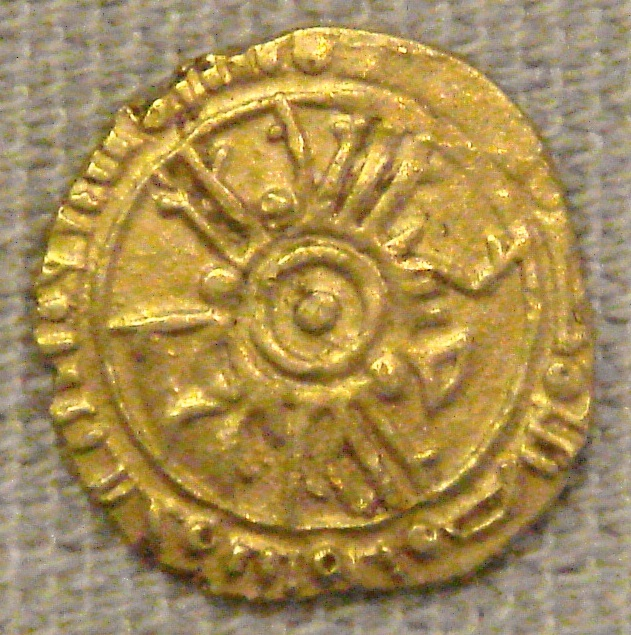
Norman tarì of Roger II of Sicily, with Arabic inscriptions, minted in Palermo. Now in the British Museum.

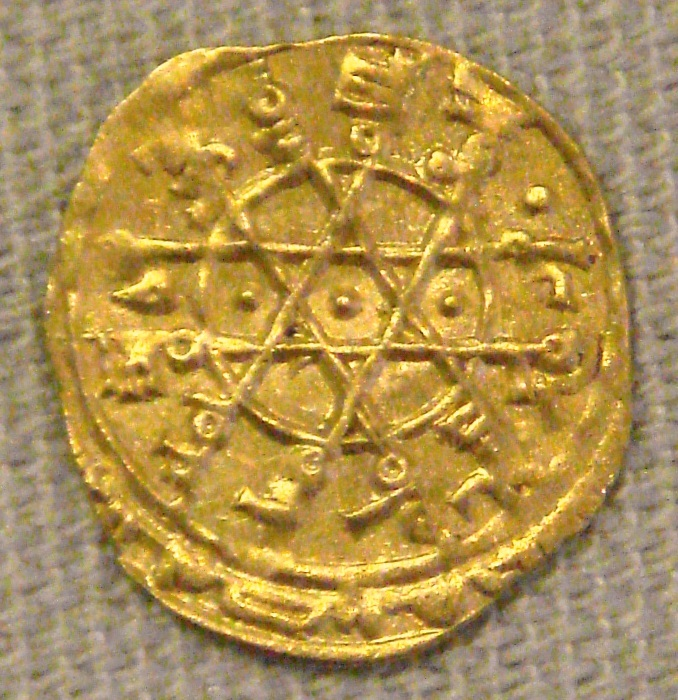
A pre-Norman Sicilian ruba'i/tarì in the name of Caliph Al-Mustansir. British Museum.

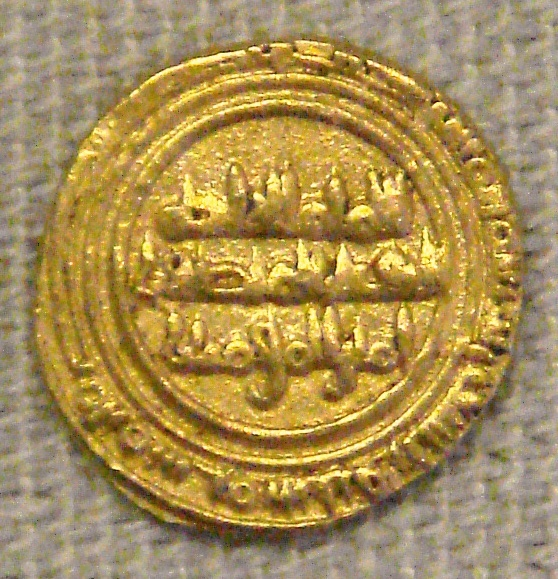
A pre-Norman Sicilian ruba'i/tarì in the name of Caliph Al-Hakim, 1005. British Museum.

Tarì (from Arabic طري ṭarī, lit. 'fresh' or 'newly minted money') was the Christian designation of a type of gold coin of Islamic origin minted in Sicily, Malta and Southern Italy from about 913 to the 13th century.

== History ==
In the Islamic world, this type of coin was designated under the name ruba'i (رباعي), or quarter-dinar, as it weighed 1.05 g (0.034 ozt) of gold. The ruba'i had been minted by the Muslims in Sicily, unlike the Muslim rulers of North Africa, who preferred the larger dinar. It became highly popular as it was smaller and therefore more convenient than the large-sized 4.25 g (0.137 ozt) dinar.

The tarì were so widespread that imitations were made in Southern Italy (Amalfi and Salerno) from the mid-tenth century, which only used illegible "pseudo-Kufic" imitations of Arabic. When the Normans invaded Sicily in the 11th century, they issued tarì coins bearing legends in Arabic and Latin. Roger II of Sicily issued such coins, becoming the only Western ruler at that time to mint gold coins. Their composition was 16 1/3 carat gold (0.681 fineness) with some adjunction of silver and copper. The tarì were also produced by the Hohenstaufens and the early Angevins.

The tarì coins were generally minted from African gold obtained from Misrata or Tunis in North Africa in exchange for grain. Nowadays, the tari is a subunit (1/12) of the scudo, souvenir coins issued by the Sovereign Military Order of Malta.

== See also ==
- History of coins in Italy
- Islamic contributions to Medieval Europe
- Norman-Arab-Byzantine culture
