= António Manoel de Vilhena =

Portuguese nobleman; 66th ruler of Hospitaller Malta (r. 1722–36)

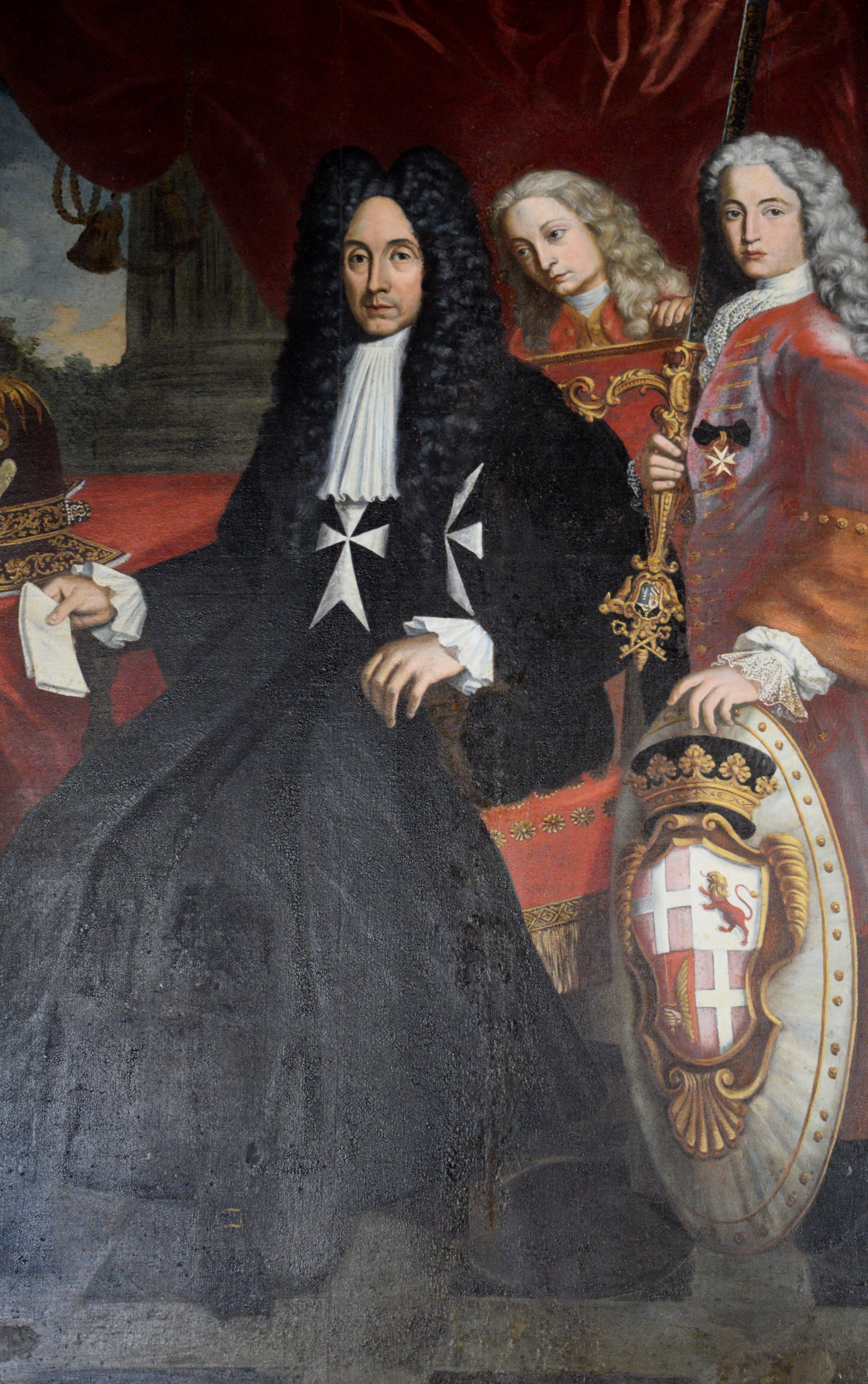
- Painting of Grand Master de Vilhena

Grand Master of the Order of Saint John
- In office 19 June 1722 – 10 December 1736
- Preceded by: Marc'Antonio Zondadari
- Succeeded by: Ramon Despuig

Personal details
- Born: 28 May 1663 Lisbon, Kingdom of Portugal
- Died: 10 December 1736 (aged 73) Malta
- Resting place: St. John's Co-Cathedral

Military service
- Allegiance: (Sovereign Military Order of Malta) Order of Saint John

António Manoel de Vilhena (28 May 1663 – 10 December 1736) was a Portuguese nobleman who was the 66th Prince and Grand Master of the Order of St. John of Jerusalem from 19 June 1722 to his death in 1736. Unlike a number of the other Grand Masters, he was benevolent and popular with the Maltese people. Vilhena is mostly remembered for the founding of Floriana, the construction of Fort Manoel and the Manoel Theatre, and the renovation of the city of Mdina.

== Early life ==
António Manoel de Vilhena was born in Lisbon on 28 May 1663 to the aristocrat and general Dom Sancho Manoel de Vilhena, 1st Count de Vila Flor and his first wife, Ana de Noronha. His father fought in wars in central Europe, in Brazil against the Dutch, and in the Portuguese Restoration War against the Spanish Crown. Vilhena was also a remote descendant by one of his direct paternal branches of the noble and royal Castilian House of Manuel de Villena. He was a remote uncle of the Duke of Terceira.

== Magistracy ==
De Vilhena was elected Grand Master on 19 June 1722, three days after the death of his predecessor Marc'Antonio Zondadari. On 20 September 1722, Vilhena took possession of the city of Mdina. He was impressed by the warm welcome he received in the traditional ceremony, and on 3 November of the same year he issued orders for restoration of the city's fortifications and renovation of the entire city. The renovation was entrusted to the French architect Charles François de Mondion, who designed a number of Baroque buildings in the largely medieval city. Buildings constructed in Mdina during Vilhena's magistracy include the Mdina Gate, the Torre dello Standardo, Palazzo Vilhena, the Banca Giuratale and the Corte Capitanale.

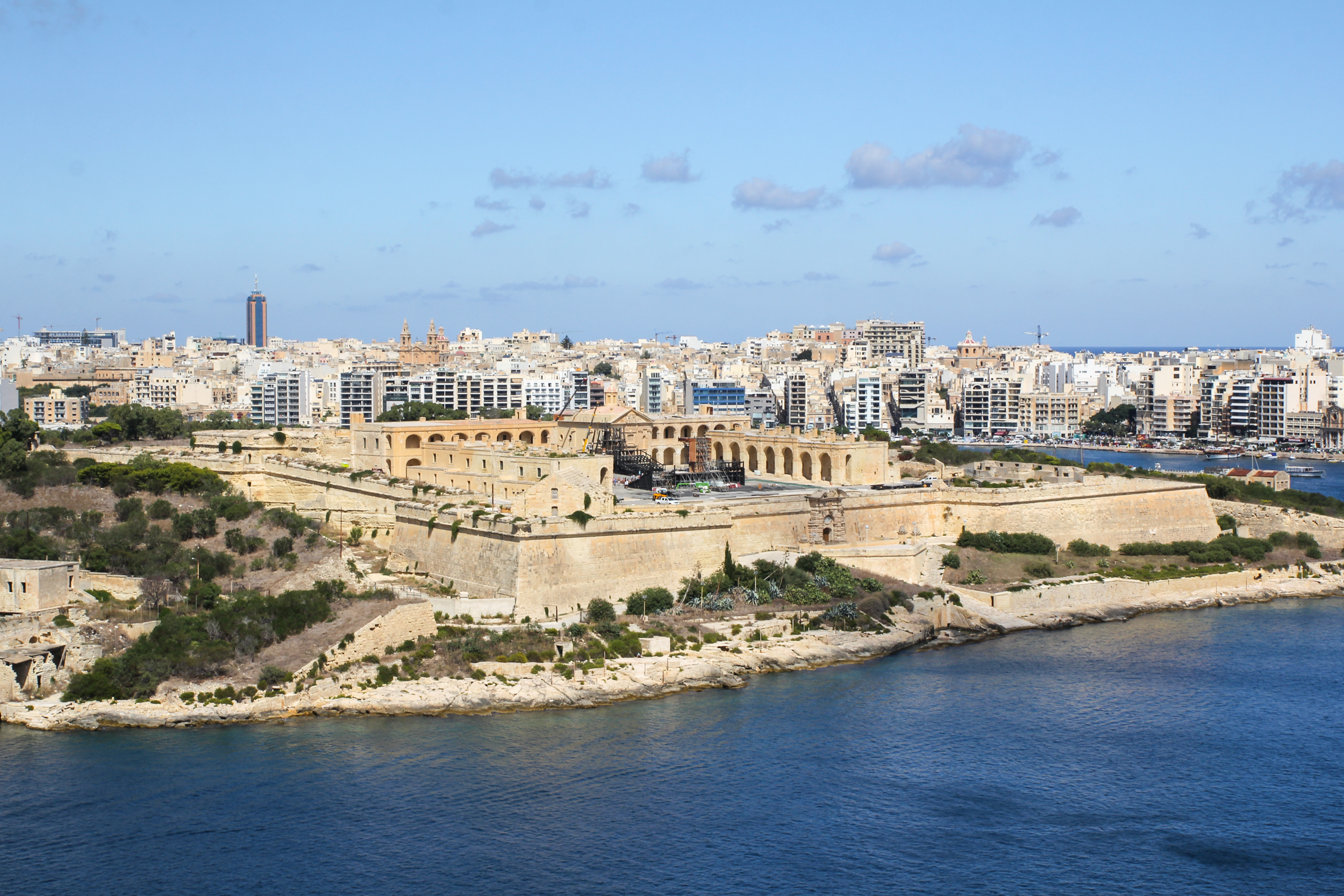
Fort Manoel, which was financed by and named after de Vilhena

In 1723, Vilhena financed the construction of Fort Manoel on the Isolotto (now Manoel Island after the Grand Master) in Marsamxett Harbour. The fort was completed ten years later, and it remained in use until the 20th century. Its chapel was dedicated to St. Anthony of Padua, the patron saint of the Grand Master. Vilhena also set up the Manoel Foundation in order to maintain and garrison the fort and its outworks. A bronze statue of the Grand Master was installed in the fort's piazza in 1736, and it was relocated a number of times before being placed in its present location at Pope John XXIII Square in Floriana.

Apart from the construction of Fort Manoel and the restoration of Mdina's walls, a number of improvements were made to the fortifications of Malta throughout Vilhena's magistracy. Saint Anthony's Battery was built on Gozo, the fortifications of Birgu were strengthened, and work continued on the unfinished Cottonera Lines. In 1736, the Santa Margherita Lines were finally completed nearly a century after construction had begun.

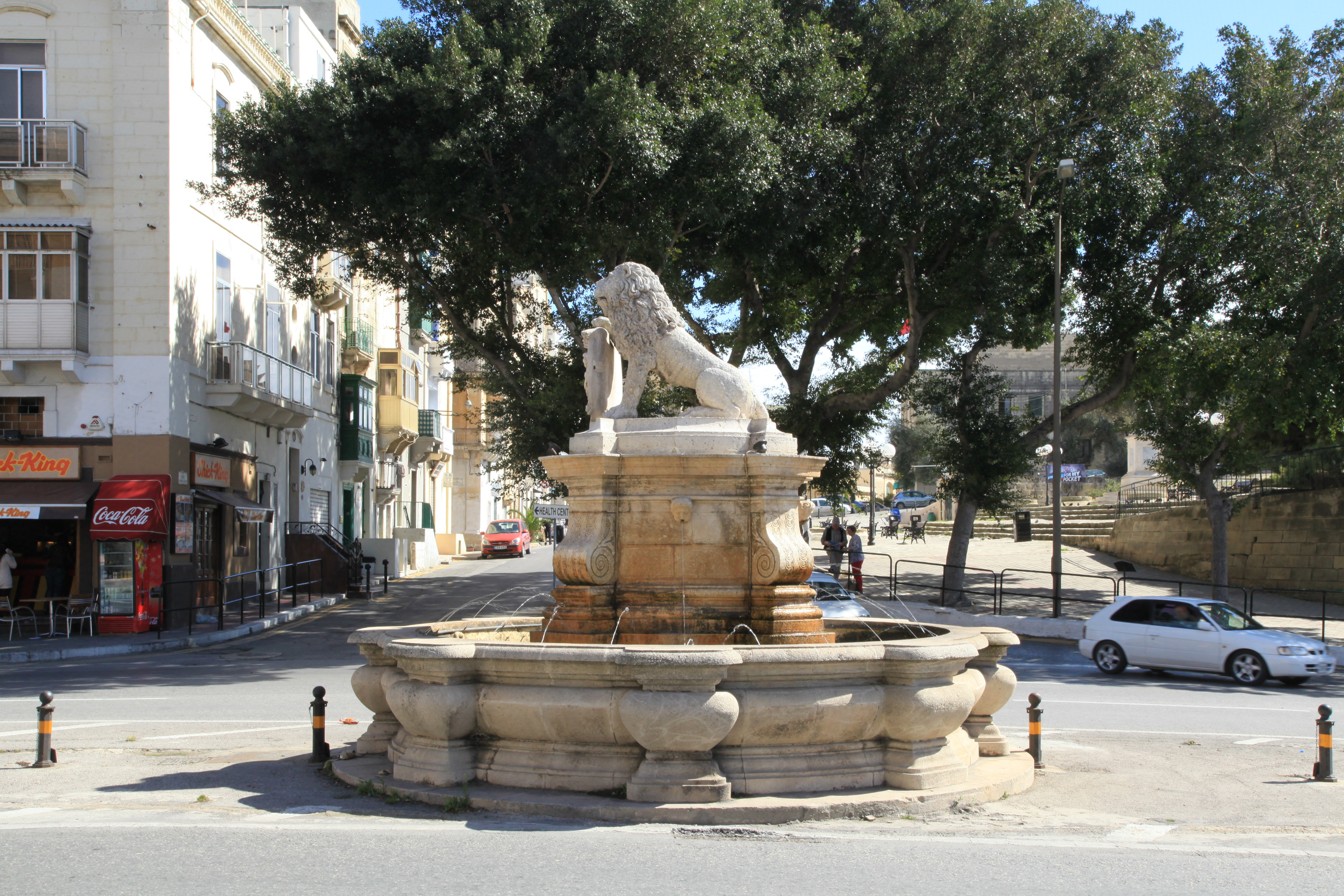
Lion Fountain in Floriana, which was built in 1728 during Vilhena's magistracy

In 1724, the Grand Master founded a suburb called Borgo Vilhena in order to meet the demand for housing within the capital Valletta. The suburb was built in the area between the newly completed Floriana Lines and the Valletta Land Front. The town is now known as Floriana, and it retains symbols from Vilhena's coat of arms in its emblem.

In 1730, Vilhena built a summer residence named Palazzo Manoel (now known as Casa Leoni) in Santa Venera. He also built a hunting lodge in Naxxar in 1733, which was later converted into Palazzo Parisio. Vilhena also embellished the 16th-century Verdala Palace in Buskett.

Vilhena also ordered the construction of the Teatro Pubblico in Valletta in 1731. The theatre opened a year later, and it was renamed Manoel Theatre in the 19th century. It is still in operation today. Another public building constructed during Vilhena's magistracy is the Banca Giuratale of Gozo, which was built in 1733.

Vilhena's magistracy was marked by the only attempt to end the perpetual war between the Order and the Ottoman Empire and establish a peace treaty. Negotiations were made through the French ambassador, but nothing materialized. Vilhena maintained the Order's neutrality following the outbreak of the War of the Polish Succession in 1733.

== Death ==
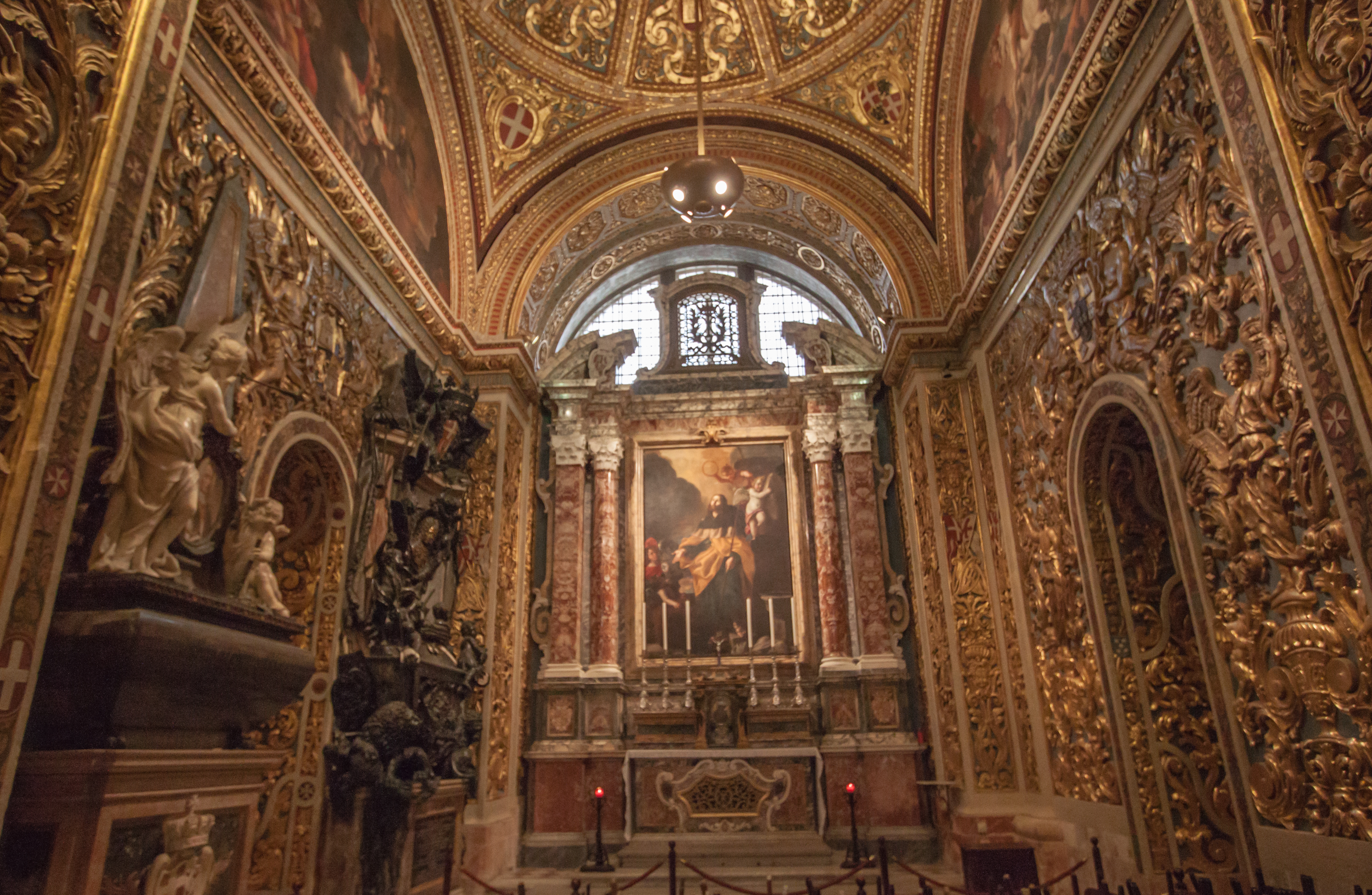
Vilhena is buried at the Chapel of the Langue of Castile, Leon and Portugal in St. John's Co-Cathedral

Vilhena died on 10 (or 12) December 1736 at the age of 73, and was succeeded as Grand Master by Ramon Despuig. He was buried at the Chapel of the Langue of Castile, Leon and Portugal within the Conventual Church of St. John (now known as St. John's Co-Cathedral). Vilhena is one of two Grand Masters buried in this chapel, the other one being Pinto de Fonseca who reigned from 1742 to 1773. Vilhena's funerary monument was designed by the Florentine sculptor Massimiliano Soldani Benzi.

Fort Manoel is supposedly haunted by a ghost known as the Black Knight, who resembles Vilhena.

== Heraldry ==
Vilhena's coat of arms

Vilhena's coat of arms consists of a lion and a winged arm holding a sword representing the House of Manuel de Villena, quartered with a white cross on a red background representing the Order of St. John. The blazon is per fess Argent a lion Gules the head Or and Gules a winged arm clothed with a maniple Or holding a sword Argent.

The Grand Master's coat of arms can be seen in many buildings commissioned by him, such as Fort Manoel and Palazzo Vilhena.

Depictions of Vilhena's coat of arms
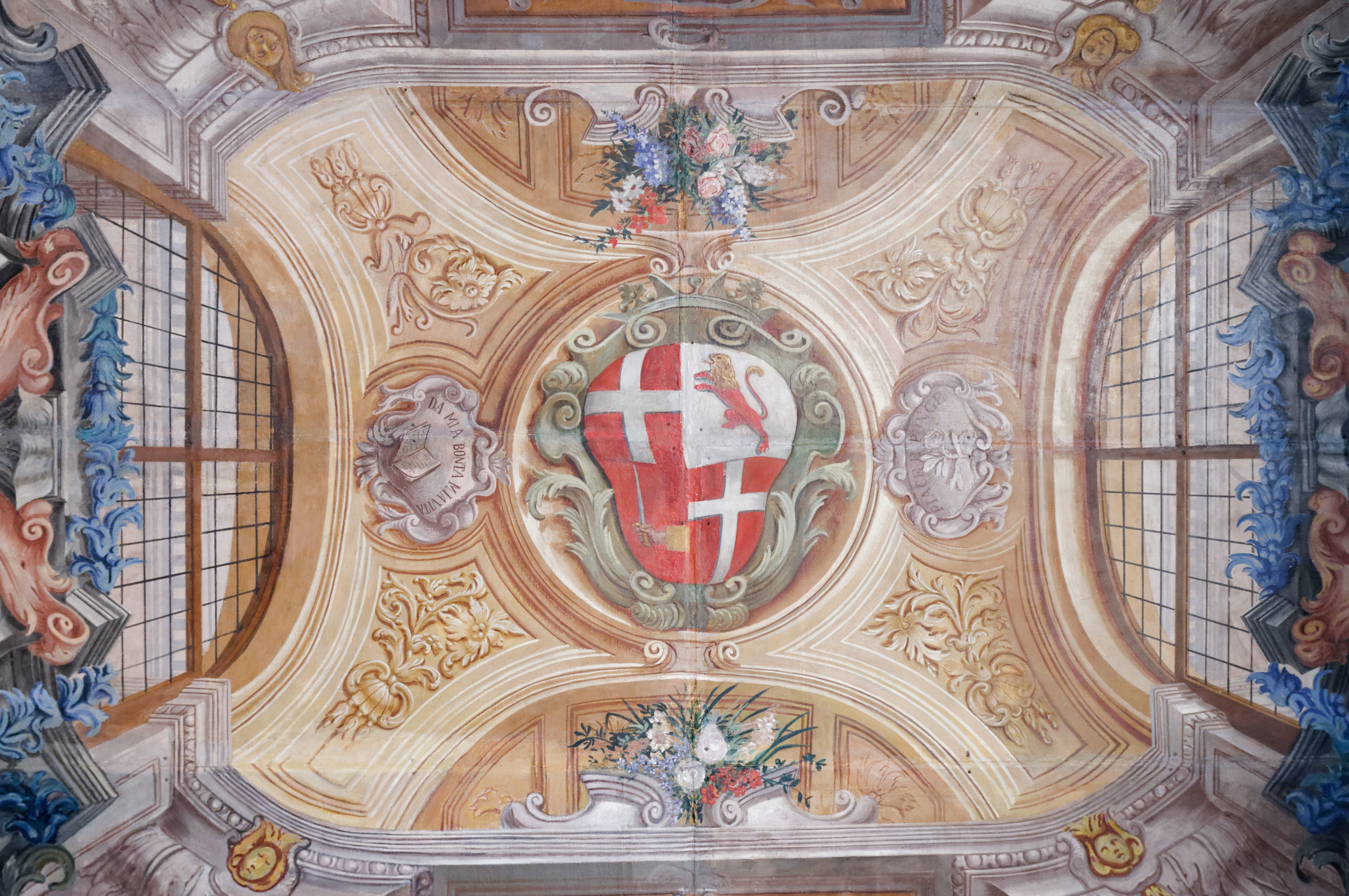
Grand Master's Palace, Valletta (fresco)

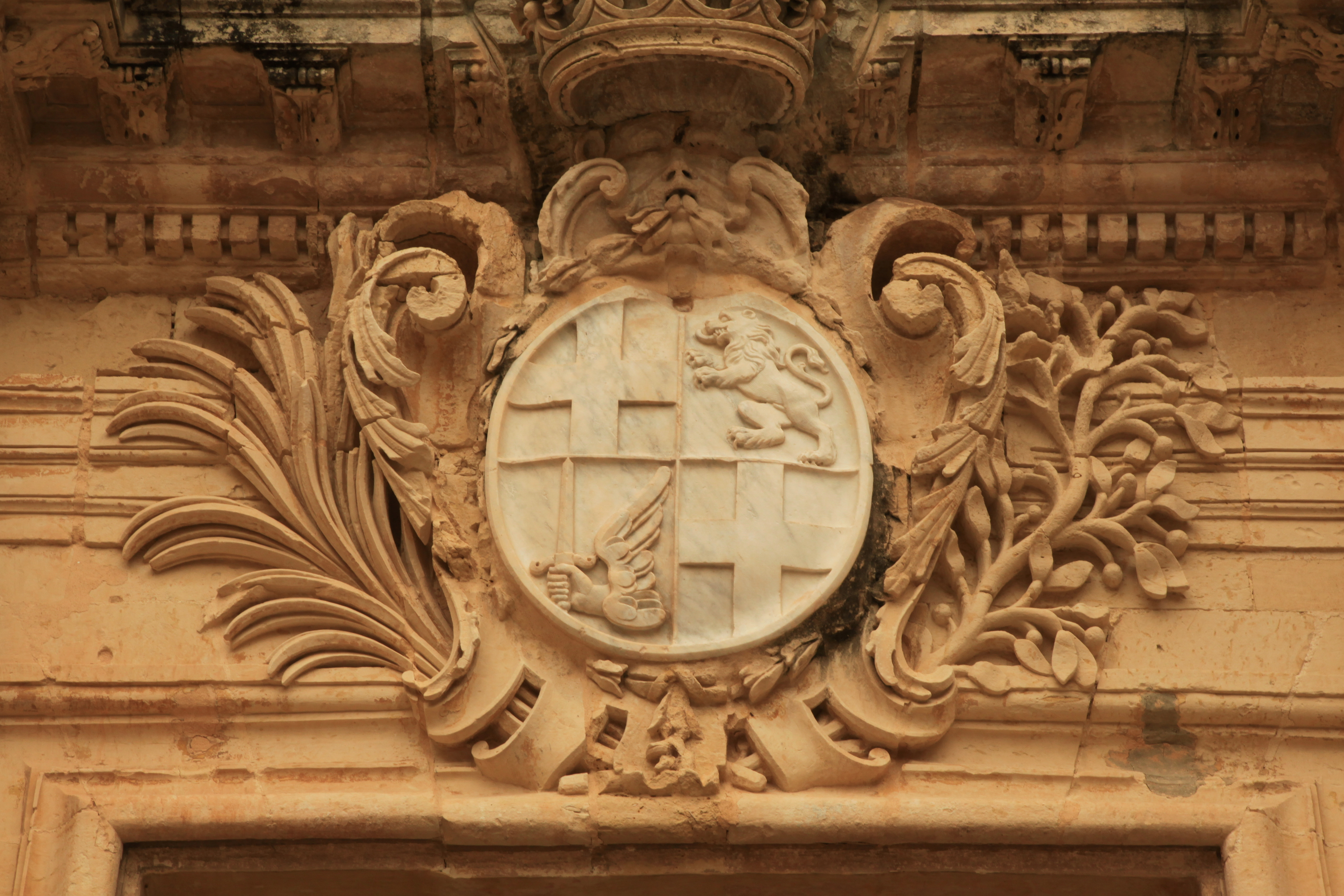
Palazzo Vilhena, Mdina

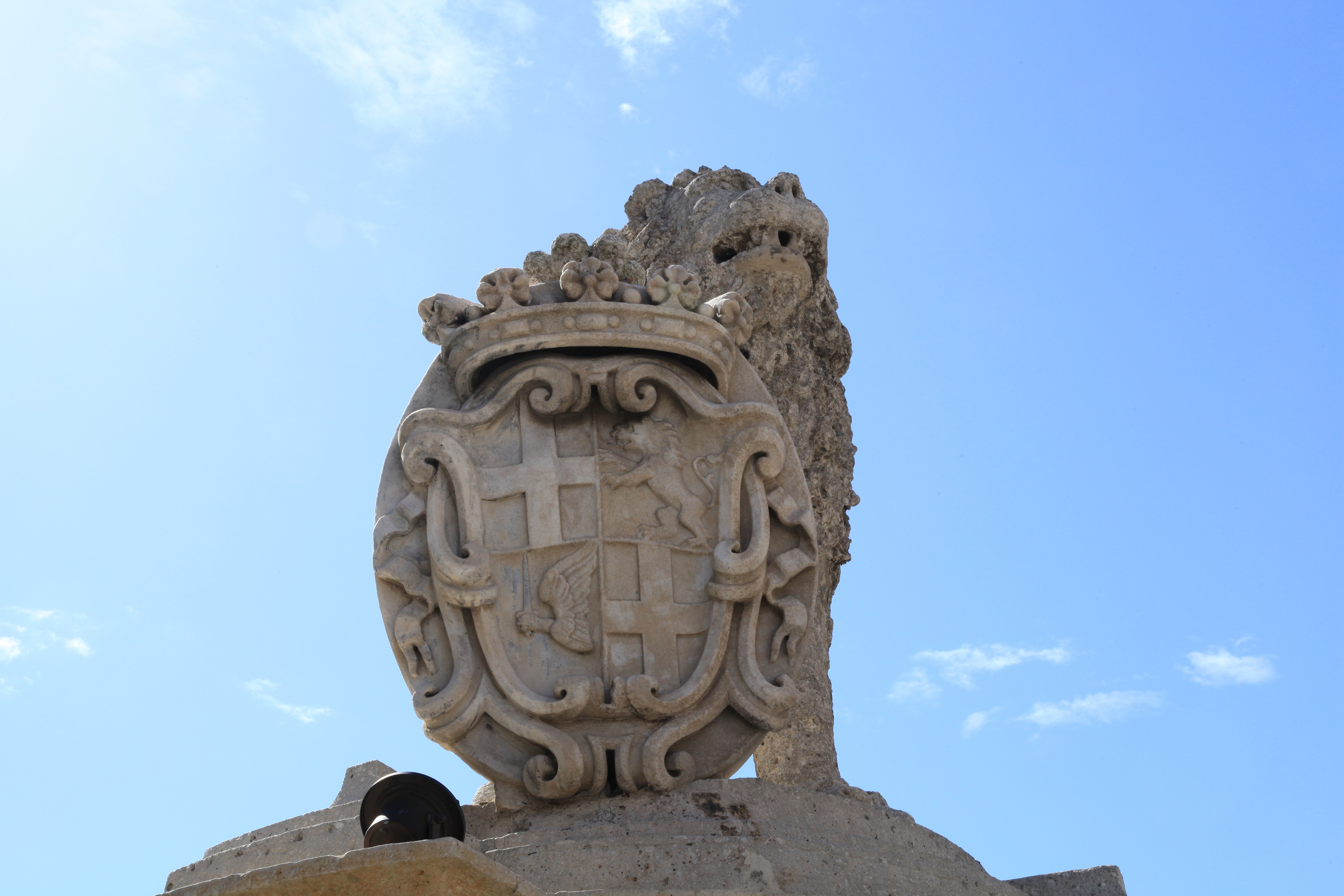
Lion Fountain, Floriana

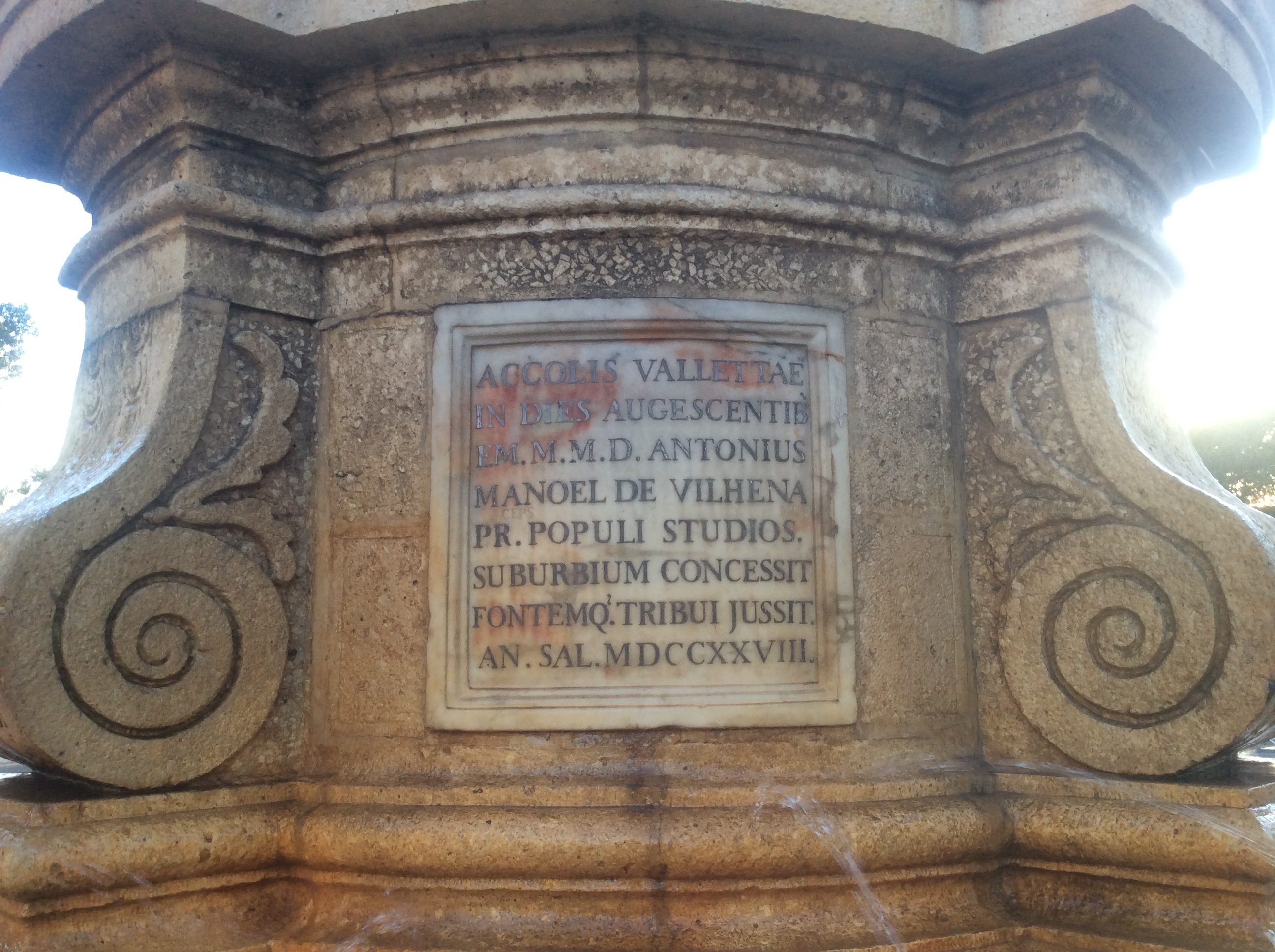
Inscription below lion

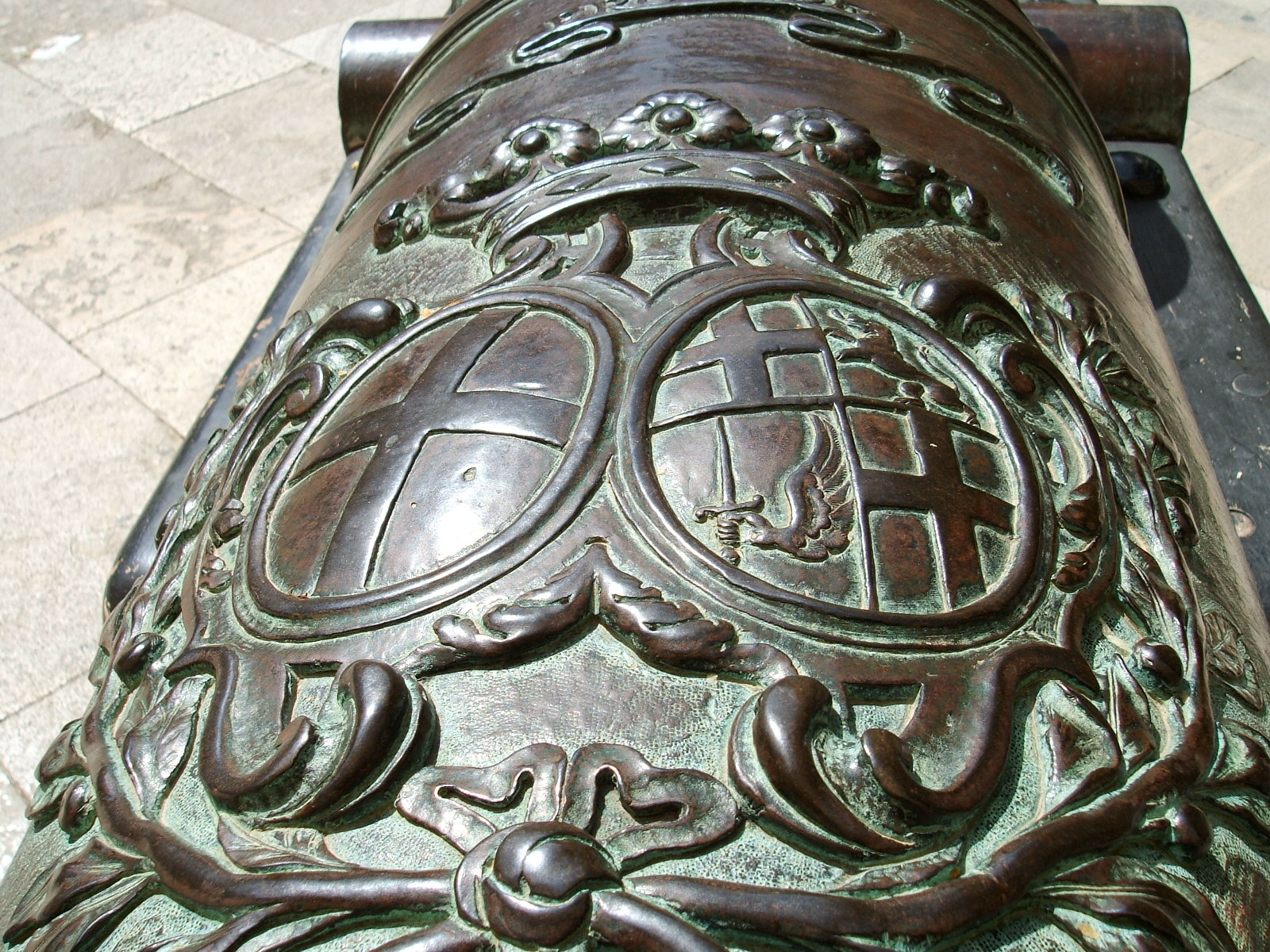
Cannon at the Palace Armoury, Valletta

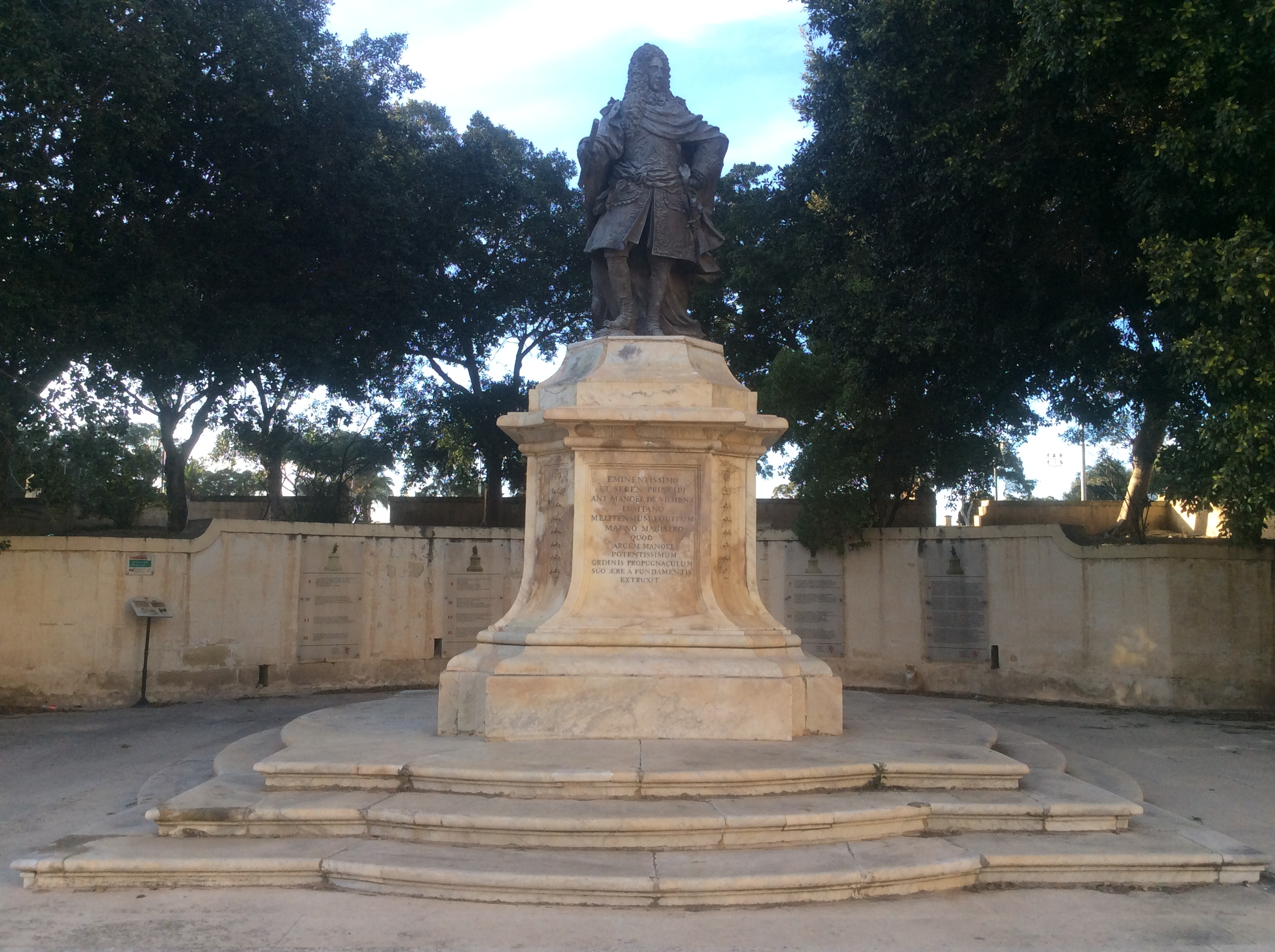
Monument in Floriana

Motifs from his coat of arms are still used today in the coat of arms of Floriana:

Coat of arms of Floriana 1993–2006

Coat of arms of Floriana since 2006

Preceded by Marc'Antonio Zondadari	Grand Master of the Knights Hospitaller; 1722–1736	Succeeded by Ramon Despuig
