= List of monuments in Mdina =

This is a list of monuments in Mdina, Malta, which are listed on the National Inventory of the Cultural Property of the Maltese Islands.

== List ==
Name of object	Location	Coordinates	ID	Photo	Upload
Palazzo Vilhena	Pjazza San Publju	35°53′05″N 14°24′14″E	01184	Palazzo Vilhena	Upload Photo
Corte Capitanale	Triq Inguanez	35°53′06″N 14°24′15″E	01185	Corte Capitanale	Upload Photo
Maltacom Building	Triq Inguanez / Pjazza San Publju	35°53′06″N 14°24′14″E	01186	Maltacom Building	Upload Photo
Palazzo Testaferrata	29 Triq Villegaignon	35°53′09″N 14°24′13″E	01187	Palazzo Testaferrata	Upload Photo
Banca Guiratale	Triq Villegaignon	35°53′10″N 14°24′12″E	01188	Banca Guiratale	Upload Photo
Casa Del Magistrato	Misraħ San Pawl	35°53′10″N 14°24′13″E	01189	Casa Del Magistrato	Upload Photo
Palazzo Santa Sofia	Triq Villegaignon	35°53′11″N 14°24′11″E	01190	Palazzo Santa Sofia	Upload Photo
Palazzo Costanzo	6 Triq Villegaignon / Triq is-Salvatur	35°53′13″N 14°24′11″E	01191	Palazzo Costanzo	Upload Photo
Casa Mdina	20 Triq Villegaignon / Misraħ Ta' St. Agata	35°53′14″N 14°24′11″E	01192	Casa Mdina	Upload Photo
Palazzo Falzon and Garden	Triq Villegaignon / Triq is-Salvatur	35°53′13″N 14°24′11″E	01193	Palazzo Falzon and Garden	Upload Photo
Palazzo Ferriol	Triq San Nikola	35°53′09″N 14°24′07″E	01194	Palazzo Ferriol	Upload Photo
Herald's Loggia	Misraħ il-Kunsill	35°53′06″N 14°24′15″E	01196	Herald's Loggia	Upload Photo
Xara Palace Hotel	Triq San Pawl	35°53′07″N 14°24′15″E	01198	Xara Palace Hotel	Upload Photo
Howard Gardens	Triq tal-Mużew	35°53′03″N 14°24′08″E	01199	Howard Gardens	Upload Photo
Mdina	Mdina	35°53′10″N 14°24′11″E	01444	Mdina	Upload Photo
De Redin Bastion	center of land front fortifications	35°53′10″N 14°24′11″E	01445	De Redin Bastion	Upload Photo
D' Homedes Bastion	SE corner of fortifications	35°53′04″N 14°24′15″E	01446	D' Homedes Bastion	Upload Photo
St Peter Bastion	SW corner of fortifications	35°53′09″N 14°24′04″E	01447	St Peter Bastion	Upload Photo
Despuig Bastion	NE part of fortifications	35°53′12″N 14°24′17″E	01448	Despuig Bastion	Upload Photo
Bastionette of D' Homedes Bastion	SE corner of fortifications	35°53′03″N 14°24′16″E	01449	Bastionette of D' Homedes Bastion	Upload Photo
St Mary Bastion	NW part of fortifications	35°53′15″N 14°24′08″E	01450	St Mary Bastion	Upload Photo
Stretch of ramparts from St Mary Bastion to Despuig Bastion	N part of fortifications	35°53′14″N 14°24′13″E	01451		Upload Photo
Stretch of ramparts spanning from D' Homedes Bastion to Despuig Bastion	E part of fortifications	35°53′08″N 14°24′16″E	01452	Stretch of ramparts spanning from D' Homedes Bastion to Despuig Bastion	Upload Photo
Magazine Curtain	Triq L-Imħazen	35°53′12″N 14°24′07″E	01453	Magazine Curtain	Upload Photo
Covertway	Il-Tomba	35°53′08″N 14°24′03″E	01454	Covertway	Upload Photo
Revetment of the Glacis	SE corner of fortifications	35°53′03″N 14°24′17″E	01455	Revetment of the Glacis	Upload Photo
Ditch	S part of fortifications	35°53′07″N 14°24′08″E	01456	Ditch	Upload Photo
Torre dello Standardo	Pjazza San Publju	35°53′06″N 14°24′12″E	01457	Torre dello Standardo	Upload Photo
Medieval land front wall	Triq Inguanez	35°53′07″N 14°24′09″E	01458	Medieval land front wall	Upload Photo
Main Gate	Triq L-Imdina	35°53′05″N 14°24′12″E	01459	Main Gate	Upload Photo
Greeks Gate	W part of a ditch	35°53′09″N 14°24′06″E	01460	Greeks Gate	Upload Photo
Traverse of Faussebraye	SE corner of fortifications	35°53′04″N 14°24′16″E	01461	Traverse of Faussebraye	Upload Photo
Left land front curtain	Between De Redin Bastion and St Peter Bastion	35°53′08″N 14°24′08″E	01462	Left land front curtain	Upload Photo
Relief of St Paul	Rabat side of Il-Mina tal-Għarreqin	35°53′07″N 14°24′04″E	02190	Relief of St Paul	Upload Photo
Relief of the Madonna and Child	Inside Il-Mina tal-Għarreqin	35°53′07″N 14°24′04″E	02191	Relief of the Madonna and Child	Upload Photo
Painting of St Anne	Inside Bieb il-Griegi	35°53′09″N 14°24′06″E	02192	Painting of St Anne	Upload Photo
Painting of St Paul	Mdina side of Bieb il-Griegi	35°53′09″N 14°24′06″E	02193	Painting of St Paul	Upload Photo
Chapel of the Visitation	Triq Inguanez	35°53′07″N 14°24′10″E	02194	Chapel of the Visitation	Upload Photo
Church of St Agatha	Pjazzetta Beata Adeodata Pisani	35°53′07″N 14°24′12″E	02195	Church of St Agatha	Upload Photo
Monastery of St Peter	Triq Villegaignon	35°53′08″N 14°24′12″E	02196	Monastery of St Peter	Upload Photo
Cathedral of St Paul	Pjazza San Pawl	35°53′11″N 14°24′15″E	02197	Cathedral of St Paul	Upload Photo
Church of St Roque	Triq Villegaignon / Triq Santu Rokku	35°53′12″N 14°24′11″E	02198	Church of St Roque	Upload Photo
Statue of the Madonna of Mount Carmel	Triq Villegaigon / Triq San Pietru	35°53′12″N 14°24′11″E	02199	Statue of the Madonna of Mount Carmel	Upload Photo
Church of the Annunciation	Triq Villegaignon / Triq San Pietru	35°53′12″N 14°24′10″E	02200	Church of the Annunciation	Upload Photo
Church of St Peter in Chains	Triq San Pietru / Triq San Nikola	35°53′12″N 14°24′08″E	02201	Church of St Peter in Chains	Upload Photo
Church of St Nicholas	Triq San Nikola / Triq Mesquita	35°53′10″N 14°24′08″E	02202	Church of St Nicholas	Upload Photo
Relief of St Francis	Triq Mesquita / Triq Gatto Murina	35°53′09″N 14°24′11″E	02203	Relief of St Francis	Upload Photo
Statue of St. Paul	Misraħ l-Arcisqof	35°53′10″N 14°24′14″E	02204	Statue of St. Paul	Upload Photo
Statue of Christ the Saviour	Triq is-Sur / Triq is-Salvatur	35°53′14″N 14°24′13″E	02205	Statue of Christ the Saviour	Upload Photo
Mosaic of St Paul	Pjazza San Publju	35°53′06″N 14°24′13″E	02206	Mosaic of St Paul	Upload Photo
Relief of St Paul, St Agatha and St Publius	Mdina side of Main Gate	35°53′05″N 14°24′13″E	02207	Relief of St Paul, St Agatha and St Publius	Upload Photo
