= Maria Adeodata Pisani =

Maltese beatified nun

Blessed Maria Adeodata Pisani O.S.B.
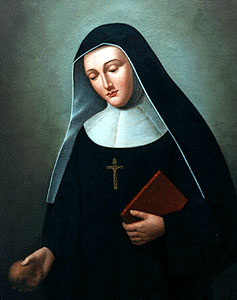

Virgin
- Born: Maria Teresa Pisani; 29 December 1806; Naples, Kingdom of Naples (modern Italy)
- Died: 25 February 1855 (aged 48); Mdina, Malta
- Venerated in: Roman Catholic Church
- Beatified: 9 May 2001 by Pope John Paul II
- Feast: 25 February
- Attributes: Benedictine habit, crucifix, bible, loaf of bread
- Patronage: Protection against cancer

Maria Adeodata Pisani, OSB (29 December 1806 – 25 February 1855) was a Maltese Benedictine nun at St Peter's Monastery in Mdina, Malta. Pope John Paul II beatified her on 9 May 2001. A number of bishops also released a pastoral letter stating that Pisani had a difficult childhood, renounced her wealth, and willingly lived as a cloistered nun.

== Life ==
The only daughter of Baron Benedetto Pisani Mompalao Cuzkeri and Vincenza Carrano, she was born Maria Teresa Pisani in Naples, Italy, on 29 December 1806, and baptized the same day in the Parish of St Mark at Pizzofalcone. Her father held the Maltese title of Baron of Frigenuini; her mother was Italian.

Her father took to drink, and this soon led to marital problems, so much so that whilst Pisani was still a small child her mother left the conjugal house and entrusted the child's care to her mother-in-law, Elisabeth Mamo Mompalao, who lived in Naples. Mompalao died when her granddaughter Maria Teresa was only ten years old. After her grandmother’s death, she was sent to the famous Istituto di Madama Prota, a boarding school in Naples where the daughters of the local aristocracy received their education.

In 1821 her father was involved in the uprising in Naples and wanted by the law. Since he was a British citizen, his sentence was suspended, and King Ferdinand I had him expelled from Naples and deported to the Mediterranean island of Malta. In 1825, Pisani and her mother came to live in Malta with relatives in Rabat, the old suburb of Mdina.

Besides suffering from delicate health, Pisani had a deformed shoulder, caused, it was later testified, by injuries sustained at the hands of a maid who beat her when she lived with her grandmother in Naples. Her mother tried to find her a suitable husband, but Pisani declined all marriage proposals, preferring to lead a quiet life, attending church and helping the poor. Instead, she wanted to enter St Peter's monastery as a novice. Her mother tried to dissuade her but Pisani was determined to become a contemplative nun.

Upon turning 21, she entered the Benedictine community of cloistered nuns at St Peter’s monastery in Mdina and took the name Maria Adeodata ("given by God"). She made her solemn profession two years later. In the cloister, Pisani was talented at lace-making. She held several roles such as sacristan, porter, teacher and novice mistress. Her charity was a benefit to her fellow nuns and to many people outside the cloister as well.

Pisani wrote various works, the most well-known of which is The mystical garden of the soul that loves Jesus and Mary, a collection of her personal reflections between the years 1835 and 1843. This work has been described as "a micro masterpiece of spiritual writing".

She was abbess from 1851 to 1853 but had to retire from her duties because she suffered from heart problems. She died on 25 February 1855, aged 48, and was buried the next day in the crypt of the Benedictine monastery at Mdina.

Pisani was remembered for her sanctity, love of the poor, self-imposed sacrifices, and ecstasies so complete that she was seen levitating.

== Veneration ==
Pisani's cause was formally opened on 29 April 1898, granting her the title of Servant of God. Pope John Paul II declared her a Blessed on 9 May 2001 at Floriana, Malta, citing as the miracle required for her beatification a 24 November 1897 incident in which the abbess Giuseppina Damiani from the Monastery of Saint John the Baptist Subiaco, Italy was suddenly healed of a stomach tumour following her request for Maria Pisani’s intervention. The beatification was soon followed by the unveiling of a huge portrait of the Blessed — a replica of an original oil painting commissioned in 1898 by Pietro Pace, the Archbishop of Rhodes and Bishop of Malta. The Pontiff also announced that her feast would be celebrated on 25 February, the day of her death.

Prayer, obedience, service of her Sisters and maturity in performing her assigned tasks: these were the elements of Maria Adeodata’s silent, holy life. Hidden in the heart of the Church, she sat at the Lord’s feet and listened to his teaching (cf. Luke 10:39), savouring the things that last for ever (cf. Colossians 3:2). Through her prayer, work and love, she became a well-spring of that spiritual and missionary fruitfulness without which the Church cannot preach the Gospel as Christ commands, for mission and contemplation require each other absolutely (cf. Novo Millennio Ineunte, 16). Sister Adeodata’s holy example certainly helped to promote the renewal of religious life in her own Monastery. I therefore wish to commend to her intercession a special intention of my heart. Much has been done in recent times to adapt religious life to the changed circumstances of today, and the benefit of this can be seen in the lives of very many men and women religious. But there is need for a renewed appreciation of the deeper theological reasons for this special form of consecration. We still await a full flowering of the teaching of the Second Vatican Council on the transcendent value of that special love of God and others which leads to the vowed life of poverty, chastity and obedience. I commend to all consecrated men and women the example of personal maturity and responsibility which was wonderfully evident in the life of Blessed Adeodata.

— Pope John Paul II, from the beatification Mass of Blessed Maria, 9 May 2001

Today the back wing of St Peter's monastery in Mdina has been opened to the public as a museum. The rooms of the Blessed Adeodata Pisani at the monastery are also open to visitors.
