= Gasper Grima =

Maltese philosopher (c. 1680–1745)

- Born: c. 1680; Mdina, Malta
- Died: 1745 (aged 64–65); Malta
- Occupations: Philosopher; teacher

Gasper Grima (c. 1680–1745) was a Maltese philosopher who specialised mainly in metaphysics and logic.

== Life ==
Grima was born at Mdina, Malta, around 1680. He joined the Franciscan friars towards the end of the 1690s, and studied philosophy and theology with the Franciscans at Val di Noto, Sicily. Grima taught philosophy and theology at Sicily, and he occupied high offices within his religious order.

In 1719, he went to Palestine to do missionary work for a year. Back from the Holy Land, he settled in Malta. He lectured at the College of Philosophy and Literature, which the Franciscans had at Rabat, Malta until his retirement and death.

== Extant works ==
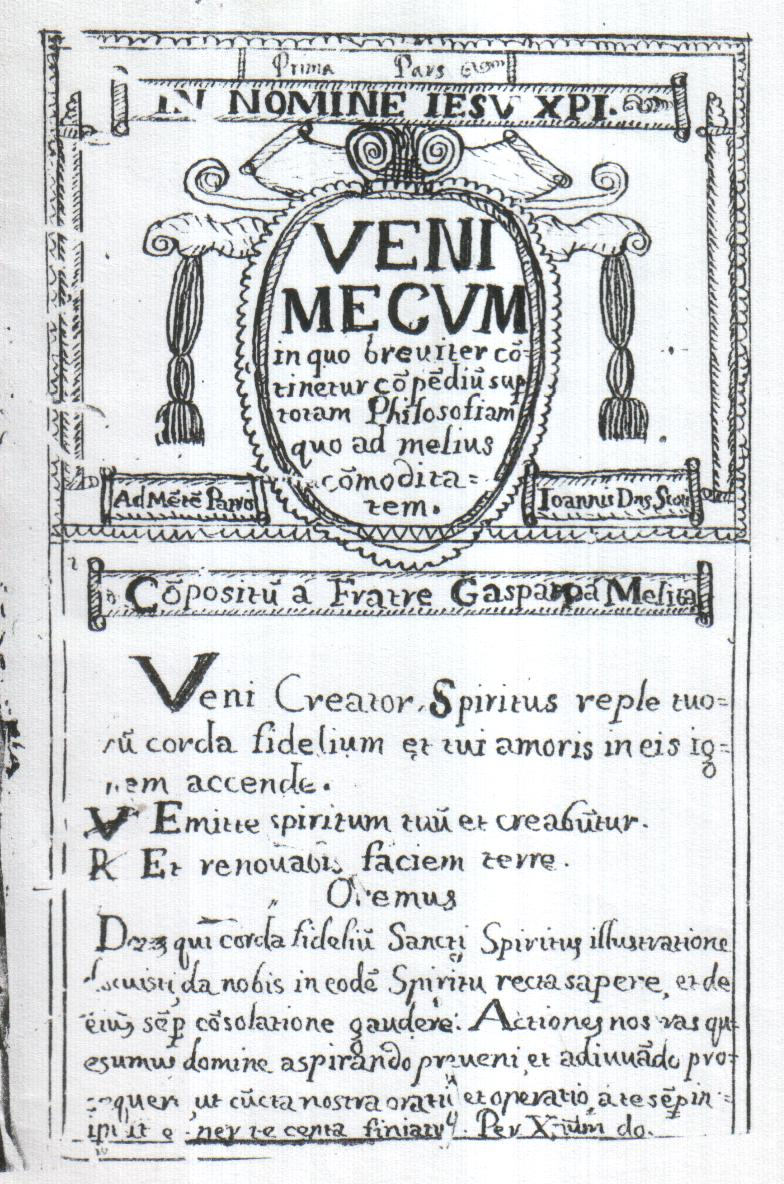
Frontispiece of Grima's Venimecum

Three works of Grima survive. They are all in Latin, and held at the archives of the Franciscans at Valletta, Malta. Though no precise dates are known for when these manuscripts were composed, they are believed to come from some time during the period 1720/45. Though they are Aristotelian and Scholastic in style and content, they are not of the Thomistic hue, but rather Scotist. They works are the following:

- Venimecum (A Compendium); 86 back to back folios. This is the first of three volumes which examine Aristotle’s fundamental philosophy. The writing opens with a prayer and is followed with a drawing by Grima of Porphyry’s ‘Tree’ showing man's position in the hierarchy of being. Through a series of ‘Questions’ and ‘Parts’, Grima provides a practical and accessible help for the study of Aristotelian logic.
- Disputationes (Disputations); 311 back to back folios. Grima's second and largest volume deals with logic and metaphysics. It also includes various drawings by Grima himself concerning Aristotelian cosmology. The work is organised in ‘Disputations’, ‘Chapters’, and ‘Questions’.
- In Universam Aristotelis Metaphysica (An General Examination of Aristotle’s Metaphysics); 38 back to back folios. The third volume of Grima's works deals with Aristotelian metaphysics, and complements the other two previous volumes. The work opens with an introduction, and then proceeds in ‘Questions’.

== Sources ==
- Mark Montebello, Il-Ktieb tal-Filosofija f’Malta (A Source Book of Philosophy in Malta), PIN Publications, Malta, 2001.

== See also ==
- Christian philosophy
- Philosophy in Malta
