= St Nicholas Chapel, Mdina =

St Nicholas Chapel
- The Chapel of St Nicholas
- Il-Kappella ta' San Nikola
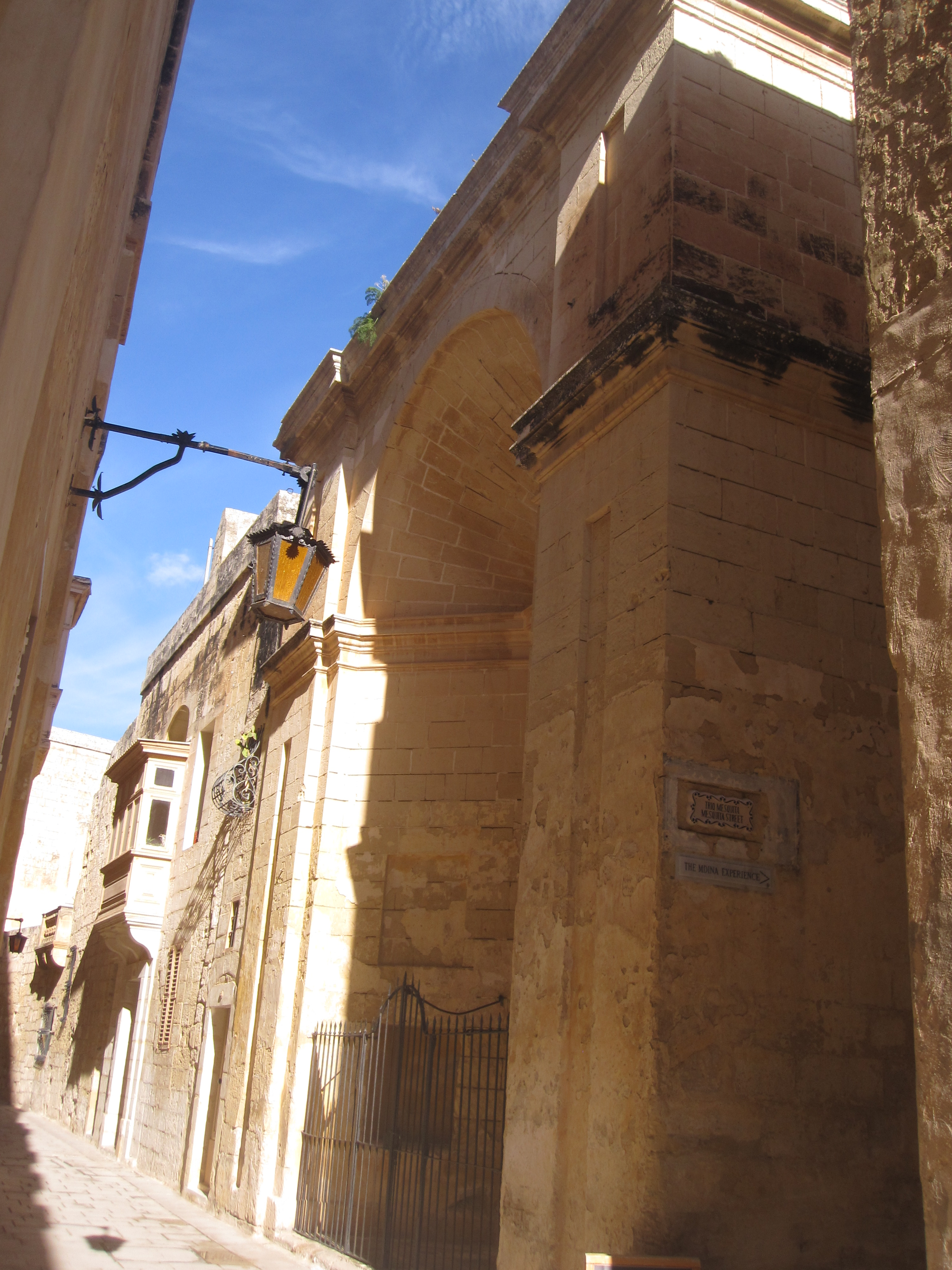
- St Nicholas Chapel
- 35°53′10″N 14°24′07″E
- Location: Mdina
- Country: Malta
- Denomination: Roman Catholic

History
- Status: Disused
- Dedication: Saint Nicholas

Architecture
- Architectural type: Greek Cross
- Style: Baroque
- Completed: 1685

Administration
- Archdiocese: Malta

The Chapel of St Nicholas is a small, disused Roman Catholic church located in the historic and medieval town of Mdina, Malta.

== History ==
A church dedicated to St Nicholas was already built by 1434. In 1685 a new church commissioned by Bartolomeo Vella was built to replace the old medieval church. Plans for the new church are attributed to Lorenzo Gafà though this is not for certain. The church was built in the form of a Greek cross crowned by a central dome. The church is mentioned in 1762 in the pastoral visitation made by Bishop Bartolomé Rull. The church is no longer in use for religious purposes and is in disrepair. It houses a number of artifacts from the Metropolitan cathedral, notably the Cathedral's Capella Ardente, which was once used in funerary services of notable people.
