= John Constance Parnis =

Maltese mediaeval philosopher

- Born: 1695; Mdina, Malta
- Died: 1735; Malta
- Occupation: Philosophy

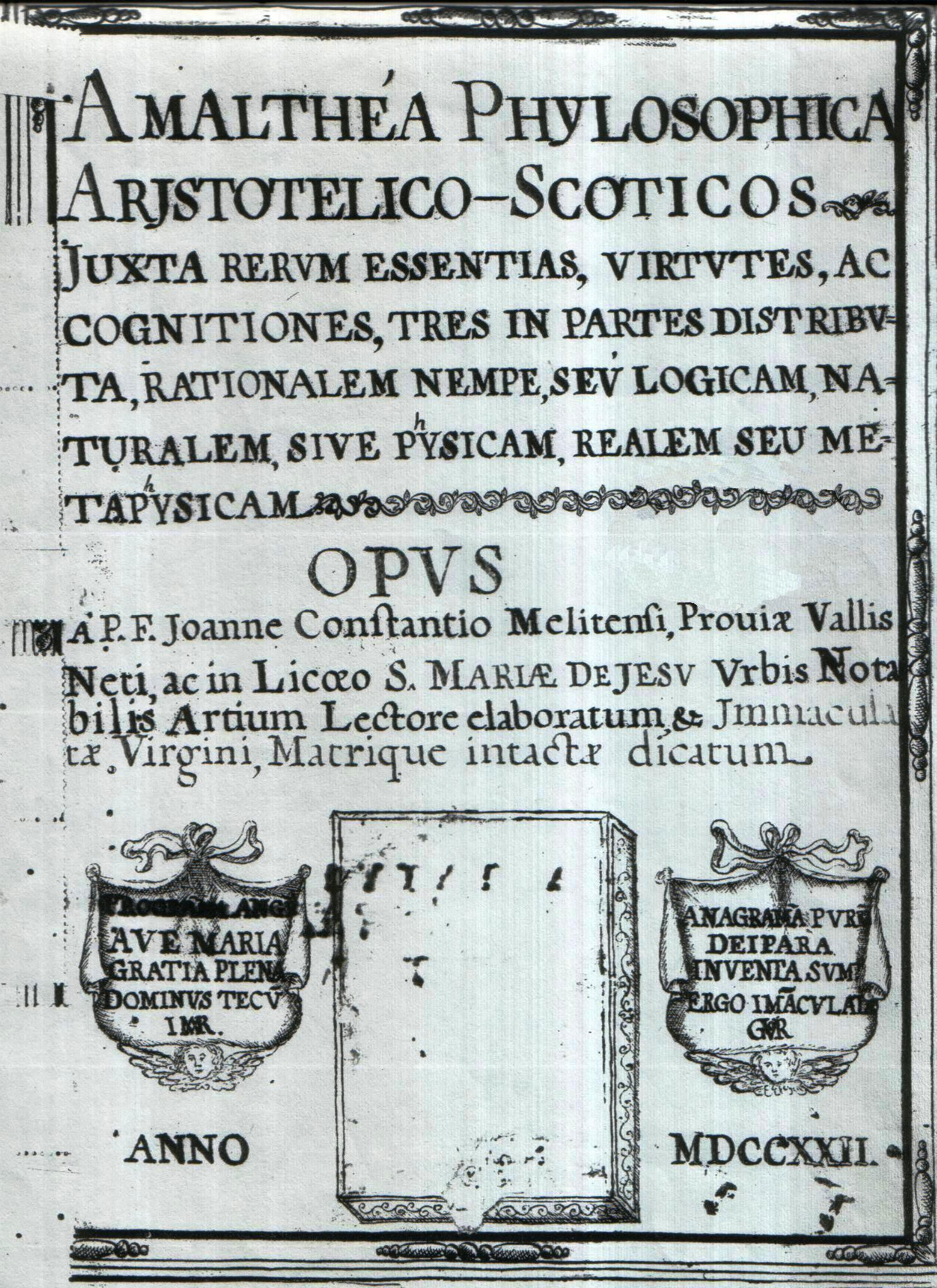
The Amalthéa (1724) of John Constance Parnis

John Constance Parnis (1695–1735) was a major Maltese mediaeval philosopher who specialised mainly in metaphysics, physics, and logic.

== Life ==
Parnis was born at Mdina, Malta, in 1695. He began studying philosophy before he joined the Franciscans. His name at that time was John Baptist, and between 1712 and 1715 he followed courses given by Constance Vella at the Franciscans’ College of Philosophy and Literature at Rabat, Malta.

Subsequently, he joined the Franciscans in 1715, and followed his initial institutional studies with them. After his ordination to the priesthood, he began teaching theology at the Studium Generale which the Franciscans had at Naples, Italy. During this time, Parnis was also appointed the Royal Theologian to the Viceroy of Sicily.

At 35 years of age, in 1730, Parnis was elected Provincial Minister (or general superior) of his religious order for Sicily and Malta. While residing in Malta, he taught at the College of Philosophy and Literature at Rabat, Malta. This was between 1723 and 1725.

He probably spent his last ten years in Malta, and died here.

== Extant work ==
=== Composition ===
It seems that only one major work of Parnis survived. This is the Amalthéa Aristotelico-Scoticos (A Compendium of Aristotelian-Scotist Philosophy), and still exists in manuscript form at the Franciscan Archive in Valletta, Malta (unmarked). The work was composed during the 1723/24 academic year (and finalised on February 19, 1724). It is a very elaborate composition made up of 394 back-to-back folios, and written in Parnis’ charming calligraphy.

The work is divided in three main parts. They respectively deal with logic, physics, and metaphysics. Though they contain a philosophy according to Scholasticism and Aristotelianism, all of them take the perspective of John Duns Scotus.

=== Appreciation ===
All parts are dealt with by Parnis is great detail. His philosophical explanations are long, meticulous and comprehensive. Despite the fact that he divides his work in a traditional manner – that is, in Disputations, Questions, and Treatises – Parnis does not limit his comments with any conventional modes of analysis. Throughout the whole work, in fact, Parnis expressly states his own opinion, and contrasts it with those of classical and contemporary philosophers.

Since the massive work has never been transcribed and much less translated to any modern language, its teachings have not been studied professionally.

== Sources ==
- Mark Montebello, Il-Ktieb tal-Filosofija f’Malta (A Source Book of Philosophy in Malta), PIN Publications, Malta, 2001.

== See also ==
Philosophy in Malta
