= Constance Vella =

Maltese philosopher (1687–1759)

- Born: 1687; Valletta, Malta
- Died: 1759 (aged 71–72); Malta
- Occupation: Philosophy

Constance Vella (1687–1759) was a major Maltese philosopher who specialised mainly in physics, logic, cosmology, and metaphysics. Vella's speciality is that, despite being a Scholastic, he was not an Aristotelic-Thomist one (as most of the well-known mediaeval philosophers are), but rather an Aristotelic-Scotist philosopher, that is more in the line of John Duns Scotus.

== Life ==
Vella was born at Valletta, Malta, and joined the Franciscan Order, probably as a teenager. He was one of the best professors of philosophy whom the Franciscan ever had at their College of Philosophy and Literature at Rabat, Malta. He lectured there between 1712 and 1715. Amongst his most talented students there was John Constance Parnis. In fact, Vella was a kind of master with a school of disciples who not only followed his intellectual endeavours but also continued to teach his doctrines after his death. Vella even lectured successfully in Sicily, where he was also renowned as an endowed preacher.

In 1729, Vella was chosen as Provincial Minister of the Franciscan Province of Sicily and Malta. In Malta, he was also signed up as Sinodal Examiner, and worked under bishops Paul Alpheran de Bussan, and Bartolomeo Rull. In 1744, the former bishop further appointed Vella as Co-Visitor for the diocese of Malta. He was held in very high esteem both as an administrator as well as a philosopher. He died on November 1, 1759.

== Extant work ==
Vella's most representative work in philosophy is a three-volume opus called Scoticæ Philosophiæ (Scotist Philosophy), composed between 1712 and 1715. Two identical copies of the manuscript exist, which for such a mediaeval document is a unique rather than a rare occurrence. One copy is held at the archives of the Franciscan friars in Valletta, Malta, and the other at the archives of the Archbishop's Seminary at Rabat, Malta (here marked as MS. 19). Together the three volumes have a staggering 1,926 back to back folios.

Volume I, containing 580 back to back folios, has just one Tractatus (or studies), entitled De Logica (On Logic), which is of course about Aristotelian logic. Volume II, made up of 615 back to back folios, includes two Tractatus (or studies), one, In Octo Aristotelis Libros De Physico Auditu (On the Eight Books of Aristotle on Physics), and the other, De Cælo et Mundo (On the Heavens and the Earth). The former deals with Aristotle’s physics, of course, and the latter with Aristotelian cosmology. Volume III comprises 731 back to back folios. It contains five Tractatus (or studies), which are the following: De Generatione et Corrupione (On Coming-To-Be and Passing Away), De Meteoris (On Meteors), De Anima (On the Soul), Compendiaria Notitia eorum quæ Mirabilem Humani Corporis Structuram Componunt (A Compendium of Information concerning Parts which Form the Marvellous Structure of the Human Body), and Tractatus in XII Aristotelis Stagirite Libros Metaphysicorum (Study on the 12th Book of Aristotle the Stagirite’s ‘Metaphysics’).

Other extant works of Vella are of a theological nature. They include Tractatus in Tertium Librum Sententiarum (A Study on the Third Book of Peter Lombard’s ‘Sentences’; 1715), Selva Morale (An Assorted Study of Morals; undated), and Selva Santorale (An Assorted Study of Liturgical Rites; undated).

== See also ==
Philosophy in Malta

== Sources ==
- Mark Montebello, Il-Ktieb tal-Filosofija f’Malta (A Source Book of Philosophy in Malta), PIN Publications, Malta, 2001.
