= Torre dello Standardo =

Tower in Malta

- It-Torri tal-Istandard
- Part of the fortifications of Mdina
- Mdina, Malta
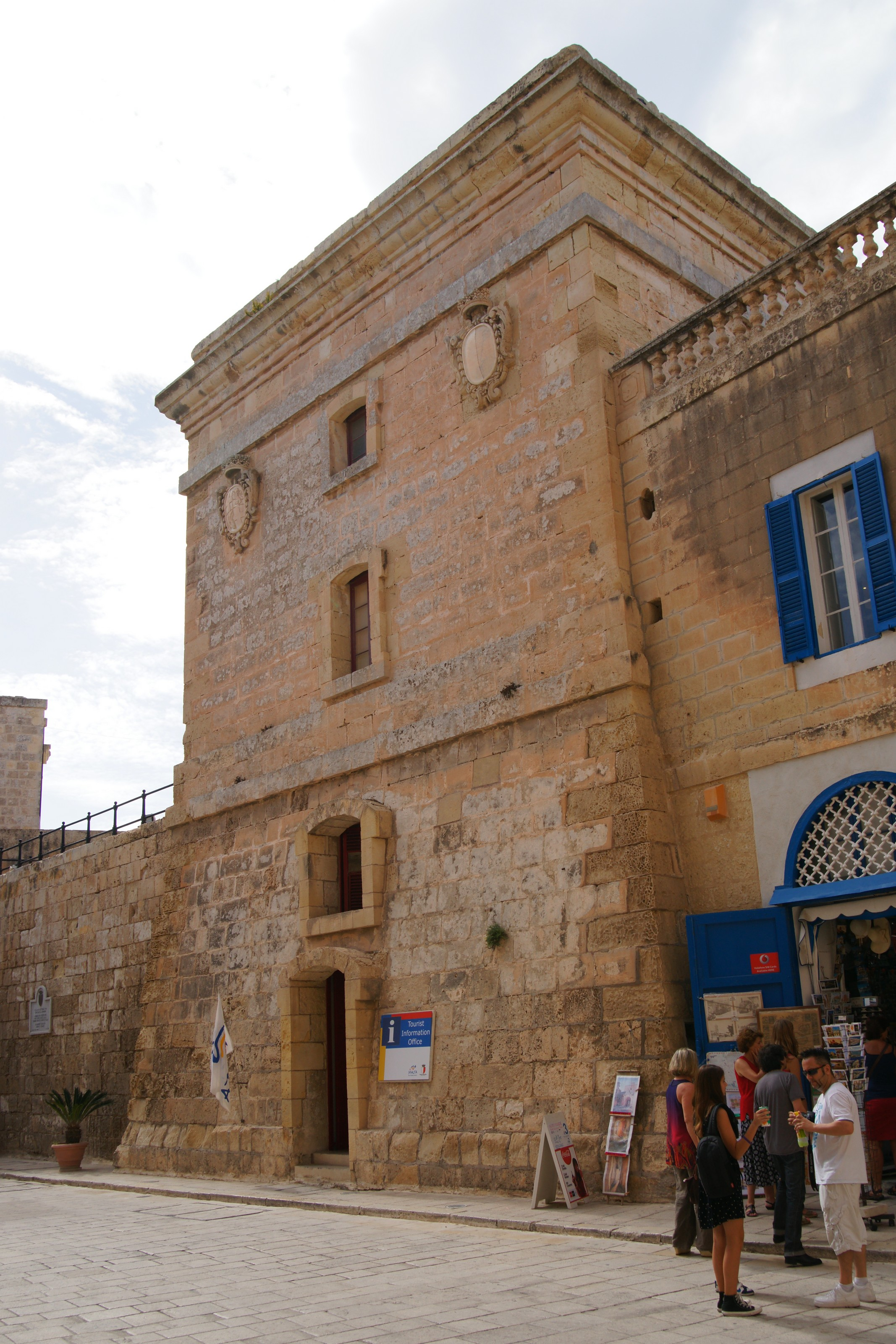
- View of the Torre dello Standardo

Site information
- Type: Tower
- Owner: Government of Malta
- Controlled by: Restoration Directorate; Malta Tourism Authority
- Open to the public: Yes
- Condition: Intact

Location
- Coordinates: 35°53′5.9″N 14°24′12.3″E

Site history
- Built: 1725–1726
- Built by: Order of St. John
- Materials: Limestone

The Torre dello Standardo (English: Tower of the Standard, Maltese: It-Torri tal-Istandard) is a tower in Mdina, Malta, forming part of the city's fortifications. It was built by the Order of St. John between 1725 and 1726, on the site of an earlier tower, and its purpose was to communicate signals between Mdina and the rest of Malta. Today, the tower is in good condition, and it serves as a tourist information centre and for occasional cultural events.

== History ==
=== Torre Mastra/de la Bandiera ===
The Torre dello Standardo was built on site of a medieval tower called the Torre Mastra (Sicilian: Turri Mastra) or the Torre de la Bandiera (Sicilian: Turri dila Bandiera). The site is located near the Mdina Gate, the main entrance of the city.

It was one of a series of towers located within the fortifications of Mdina. The tower, like many other medieval buildings in Mdina, had suffered significant damage during the 1693 Sicily earthquake. The tower was eventually demolished in March 1725 to be replaced by the Torre dello Standardo.

=== Torre dello Standardo/Stendardo ===
Torre dello Standardo started to be built in 1725 to designs of the French military engineer Charles François de Mondion, as part of a project to rebuild the entrance to Mdina in the Baroque style during the magistracy of Grand Master António Manoel de Vilhena. It was completed in July 1726.

During the Maltese uprising of 1798 against the French occupation of Malta, rebels hosted Maltese, Neapolitan and Portuguese flags on the tower when the Portuguese Navy came to aid the insurgents. It remained in use as a signal tower until the early period of the British rule.

== Use ==
=== Purposely built ===
Both the Torre Mastra and the Torre dello Standardo served the same purpose to relay signals from Mdina to the rest of the island of Malta. A fire would be ignited to send a warning to the inhabitants and nearby towers in case of an invasion, while it was also armed with canons which fired every evening before the city closes the entrances.

=== Adaptive reuse ===
In the 19th century, when the nearby Palazzo Vilhena was used as a sanatorium by the British military, the tower was used to house the porter and other servants of the sanatorium. By 1888, it was being used as a Telegraph Office. The tower eventually became a police station, until the police moved across the street to the former Maltacom Building in 2002.

Since March 2011 the tower has been a tourist information centre.

=== Other ===
The tower, along with the rear of the Mdina Gate, was depicted on the Lm5 banknote that was in circulation between 1989 and 2007.

== Architecture ==
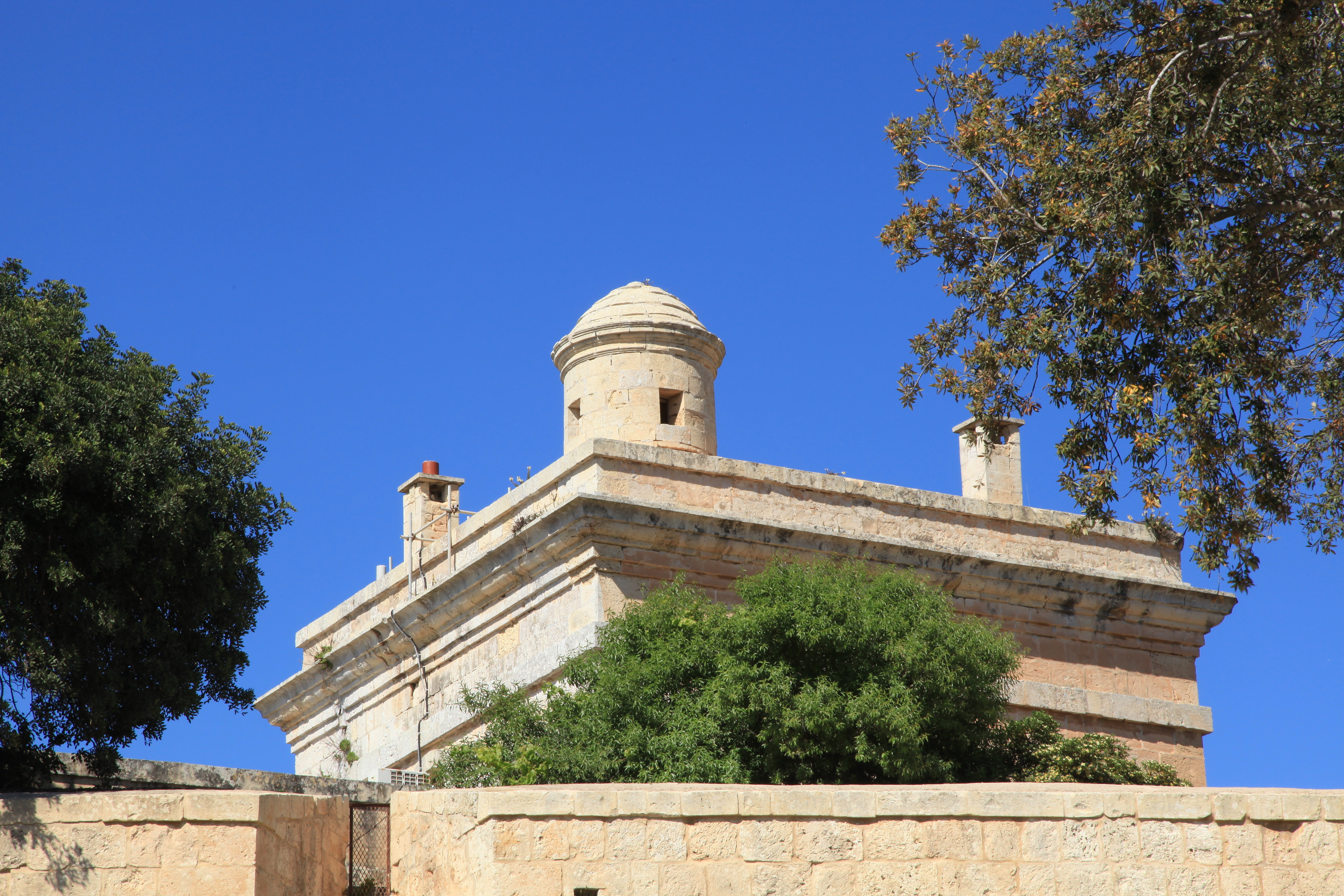
The tower's domed cylindrical stair-hood

The Torre dello Standardo's design is similar to the coastal watchtowers such as the De Redin towers that the Order built in Malta during the 17th century. It has the same basic layout, with two floors and a scarped base. However, this tower is of finer construction than the coastal towers, having decorative Baroque elements such as mouldings, as well as escutcheons containing the coats of arms of De Vilhena and the city of Mdina. The sculptural details are the work of Francesco Zahra. The tower has a cylindrical stair-hood with a dome, and this feature is similar to that found at Palazzo Stagno and the now-demolished Gourgion Tower.

=== Heritage ===
The tower is a heritage and cultural building. It was included on the Antiquities List of 1925. It is now scheduled as a Grade 1 national monument, and it is also listed on the National Inventory of the Cultural Property of the Maltese Islands.
