= Palazzo Santa Sofia =

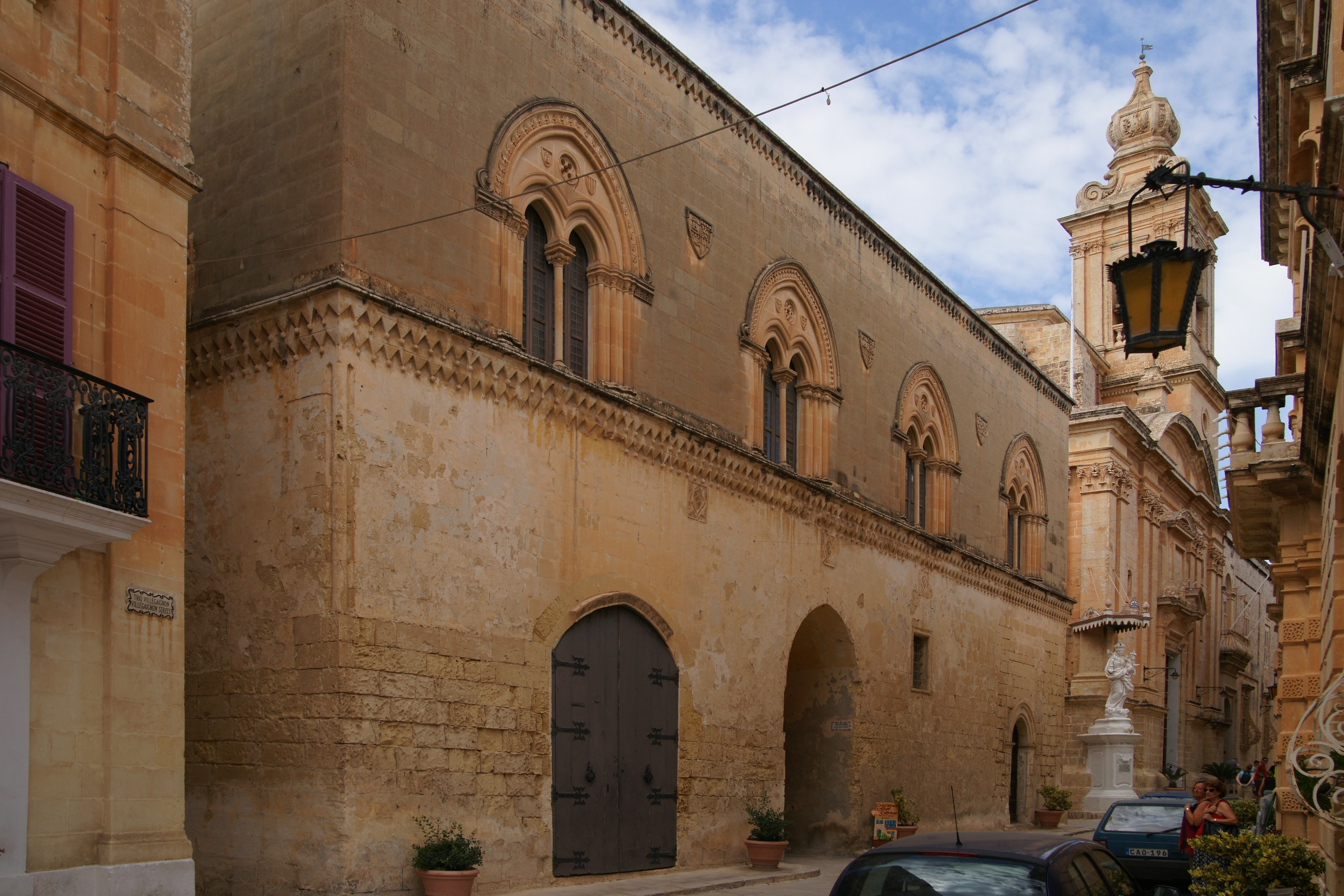
- Façade of Palazzo Santa Sofia
- Interactive map of the Palazzo Santa Sofia area

General information
- Status: Intact
- Type: Palace
- Architectural style: Medieval
- Location: Mdina, Malta
- Coordinates: 35°53′11.2″N 14°24′10.9″E
- Current tenants: Fondazzjoni Patrimonju Malti
- Construction started: 1233
- Renovated: 20th century
- Owner: Private

Technical details
- Material: Limestone
- Floor count: 2

Palazzo Santa Sofia is a palace in Mdina, Malta, located in Villegaignon Street, across the square from the cathedral. Its ground floor was built in 1233, and it is believed to be the oldest surviving building in the city. The upper floor is of a much later construction, being built in the 20th century.

== History ==
The ground floor of Palazzo Santa Sofia was built in the 13th century, and the date 1233 is inscribed on the moulding of one of its windows. The upper floor was built sometime after 1938. The building was periodically rented and used as a school run by Roman Catholic nuns.

Today, the palace is privately owned, and it is managed by a local heritage foundation Fondazzjoni Patrimonju Malti. It is not open to the general public, although it can be hired for dinner or cocktail parties, lectures or other events. The palace is scheduled as a Grade 1 national monument, and also listed in the National Inventory of the Cultural Property of the Maltese Islands.

== Architecture ==
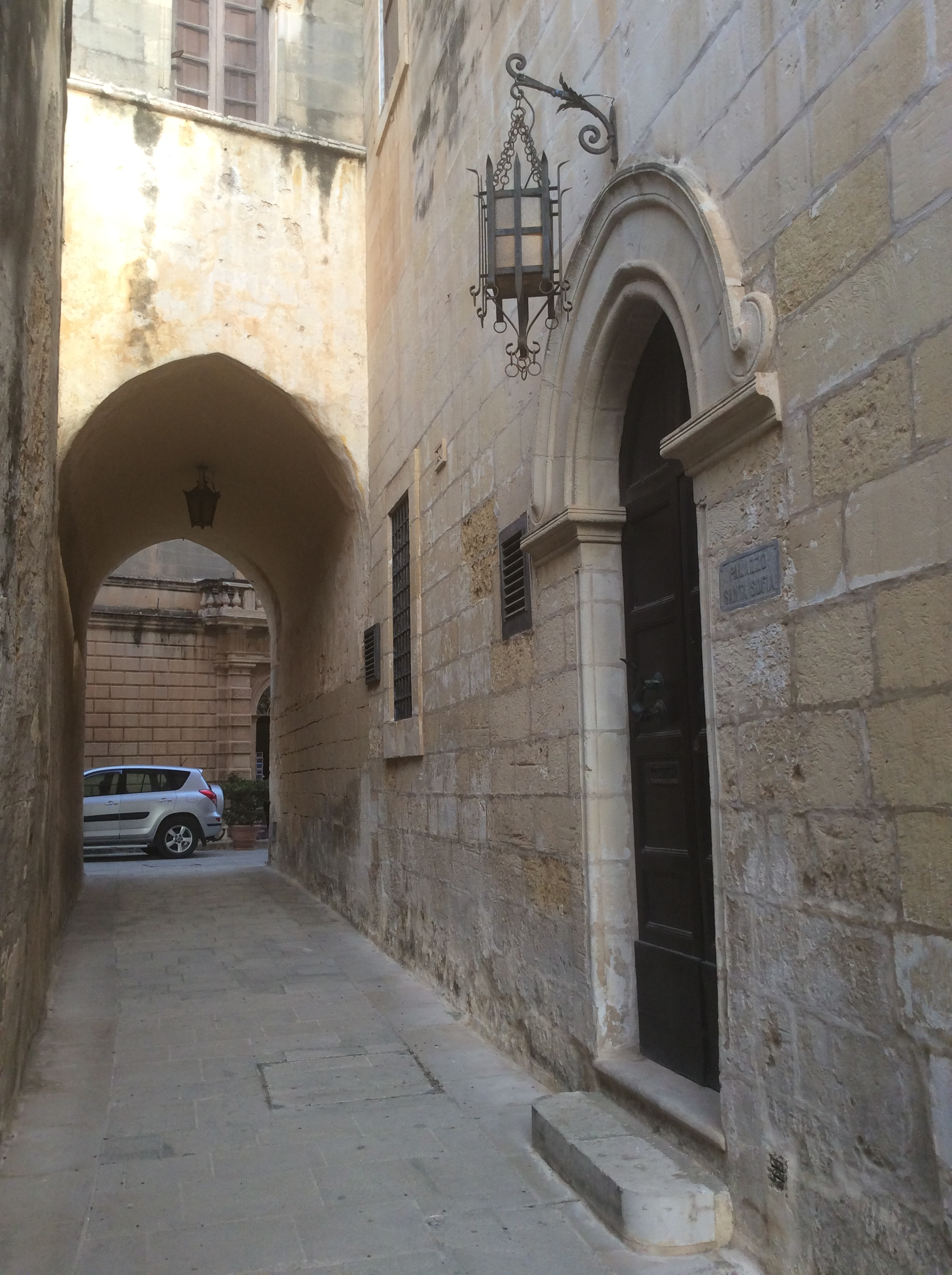
The narrow street

Palazzo Santa Sofia originally had a single story, and was built around a central courtyard. The main doorway to the palace was originally through an arched passageway known as a siqifah, which led to the courtyard. The passageway was eventually converted into a narrow street called Triq Santa Sofia (Santa Sofia Street). The façade of the ground floor is rather plain, and it contains two doors with the passageway in between. A two-tiered palline losanghe cornice separates the ground floor from the first floor. This cornice is similar to the one at the nearby Palazzo Falson.

The more recent upper floor is characterized by four ornate mullioned windows, and a one-tiered palline losanghe cornice is located at the roof level. A number of coats of arms can be found on both floors of the façade.
