= St Roque's Church, Mdina =

St Roque Church
- Our Lady of Light Chapel
- Kappella ta San Rokku
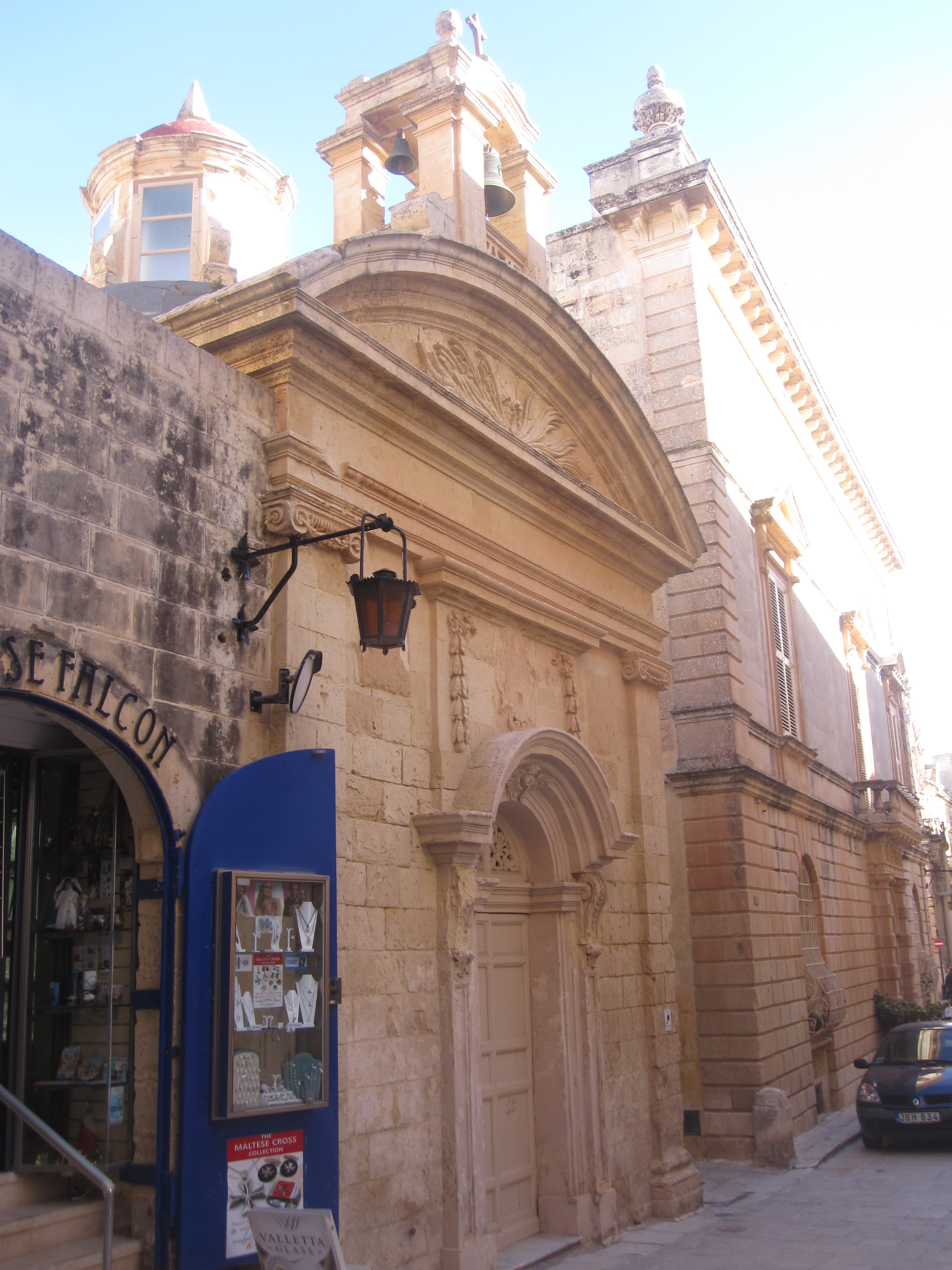

- Location within Malta
- 35°53′11.6″N 14°24′11.3″E
- Location: Mdina
- Country: Malta
- Denomination: Roman Catholic

History
- Dedication: Saint Roch

Architecture
- Style: Baroque

Administration
- Archdiocese: Malta

Clergy
- Archbishop: Charles Scicluna

The Chapel of St. Roque, also known as the Chapel of Our Lady of Light, is a Roman Catholic chapel located in Mdina, Malta.

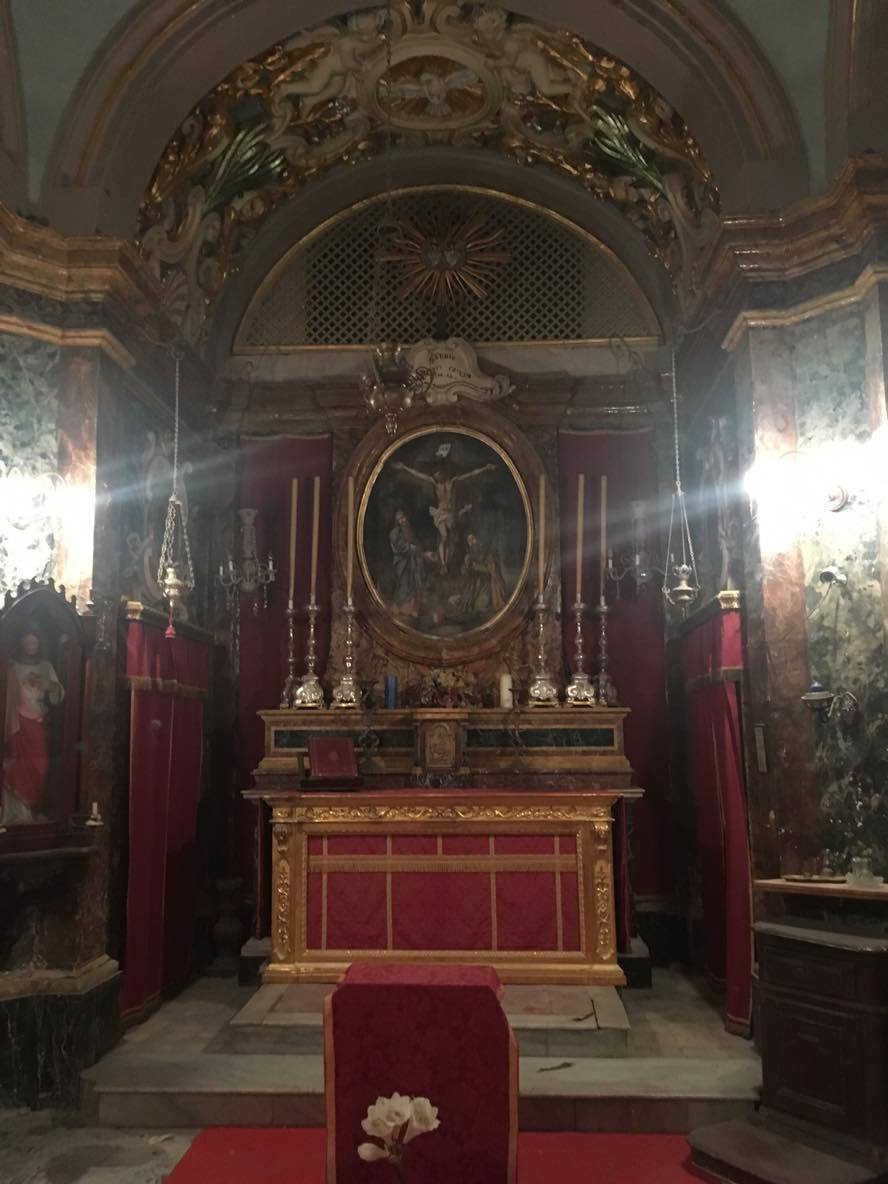
Interior of the Chapel

== History ==
The original chapel building that stood on the site, of the present church, existed in 1393 under the dedication of the Holy Cross. However, the chapel was demolished in 1681 and another dedicated to Saint Roque was built in the 18th century. In time this chapel became known as Our Lady of Light, as a consequence of a painting depicting the Virgin of Light being installed in the chapel.
