= Annunciation Church, Mdina =

Annunciation Church
- The Church of the Annunciation of Our Lord
- Carmelite Church
- Knisja tal-Lunzjata
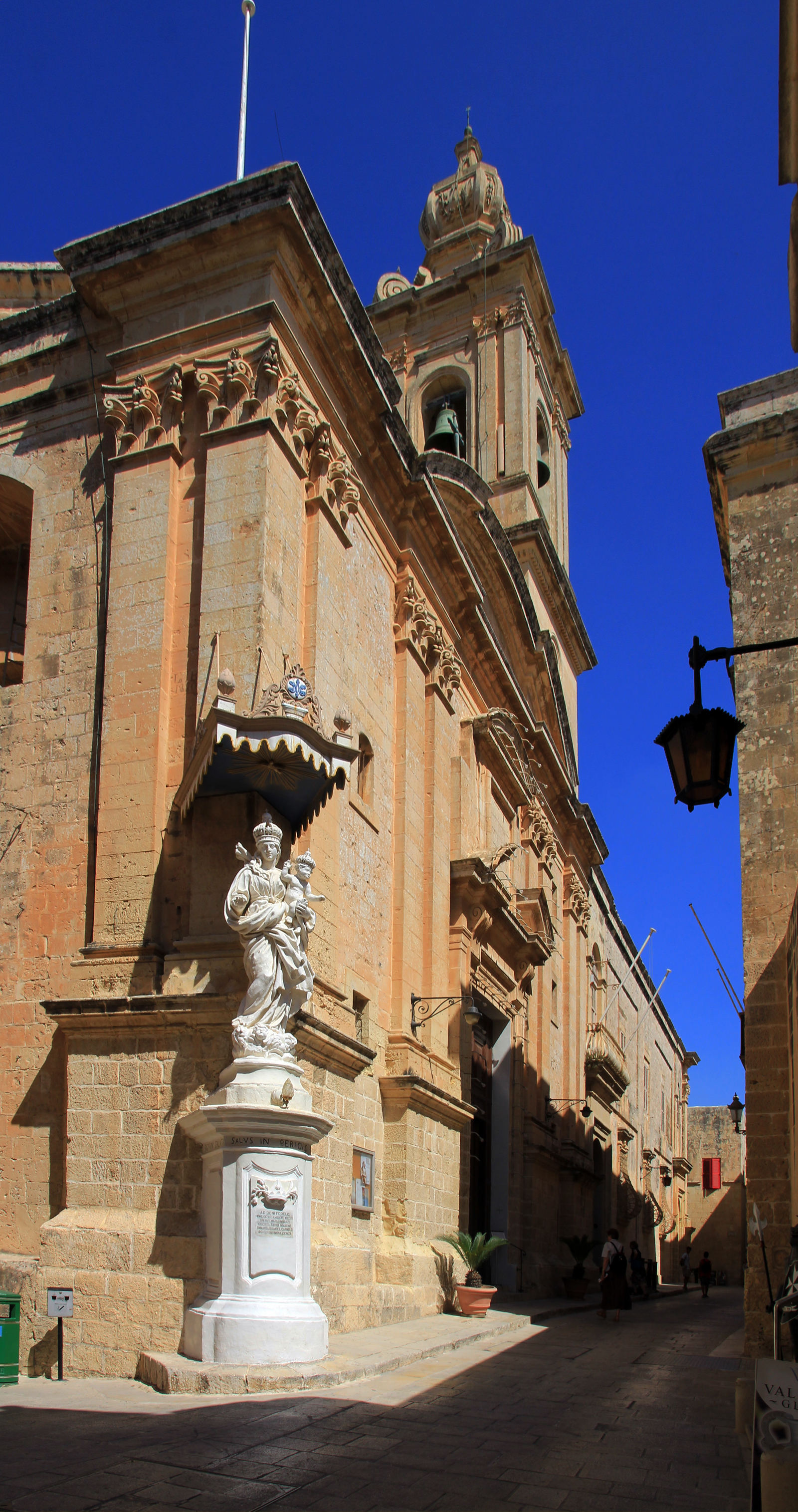

- Location within Malta
- 35°53′12.2″N 14°24′10.8″E
- Location: Mdina
- Country: Malta
- Denomination: Roman Catholic

History
- Status: Active
- Dedication: Annunciation

Architecture
- Functional status: Priory Church
- Architect: Mederico Blondel des Croisettes
- Style: Baroque
- Completed: 1675

Administration
- Archdiocese: Malta

Clergy
- Archbishop: Charles Scicluna
- Abbot: Charlo Camilleri

The Church of the Annunciation also known as The Carmelite Church is a rich Baroque priory church of the Priory of Our Lady of Mount Carmel located in Mdina, Malta.

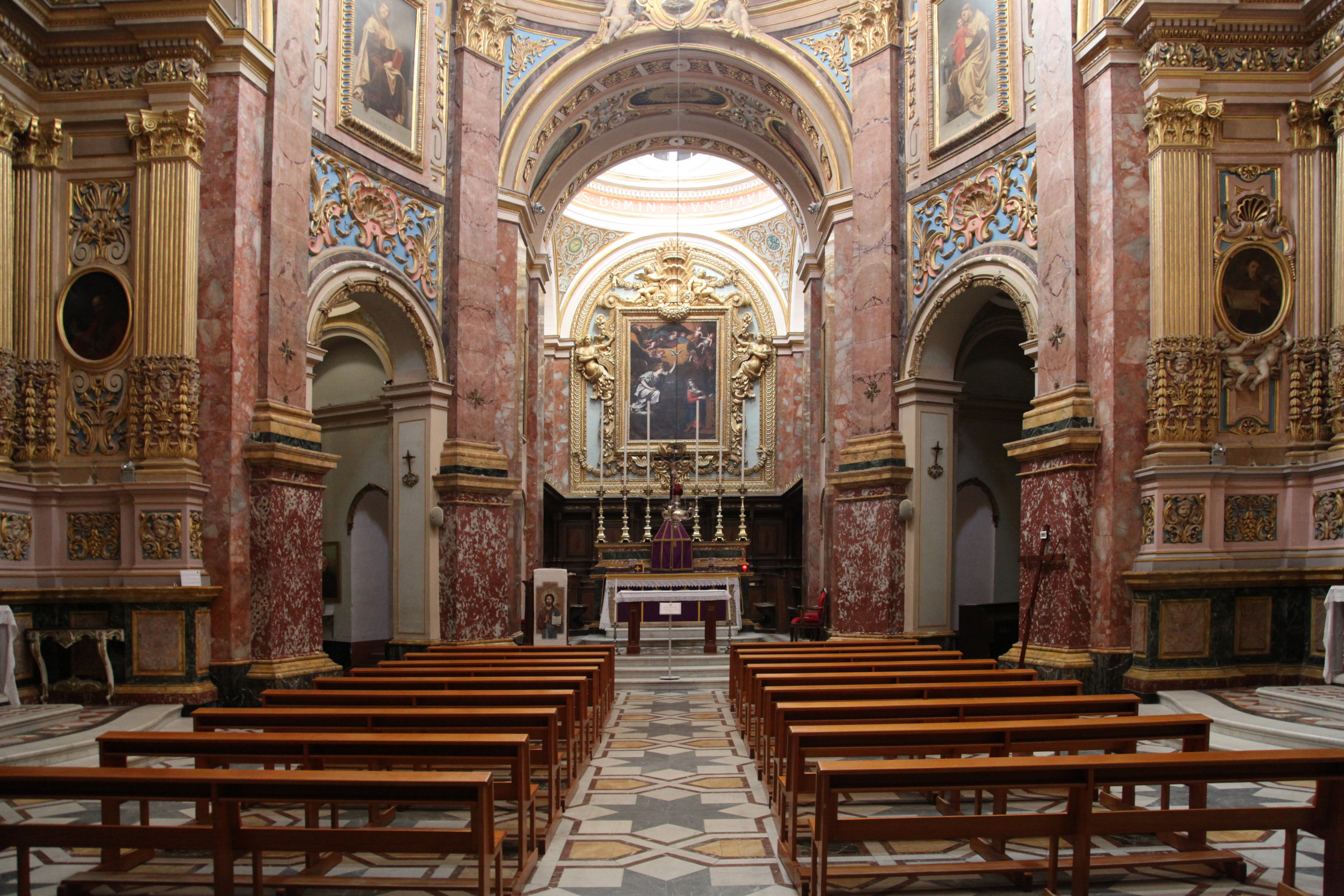
Interior of the church

== History ==
Records mention that on the site of the present church stood an earlier church dedicated to the Nativity of Mary. Other sources mention that the chapel was dedicated to the Virgin of the Fortress (della Rocca). The chapel and the surrounding area was given to the Carmelites in the 1650s. The church was built between 1660 and 1675 on the designs of Mederico Blondel des Croisettes.

After the earthquake of 1693 destroyed many important buildings, notably the medieval cathedral of St Paul, the cathedral chapter moved to the Carmelite church until 1702 when the new cathedral was built. Moreover, the church also served as the parish church during this time.

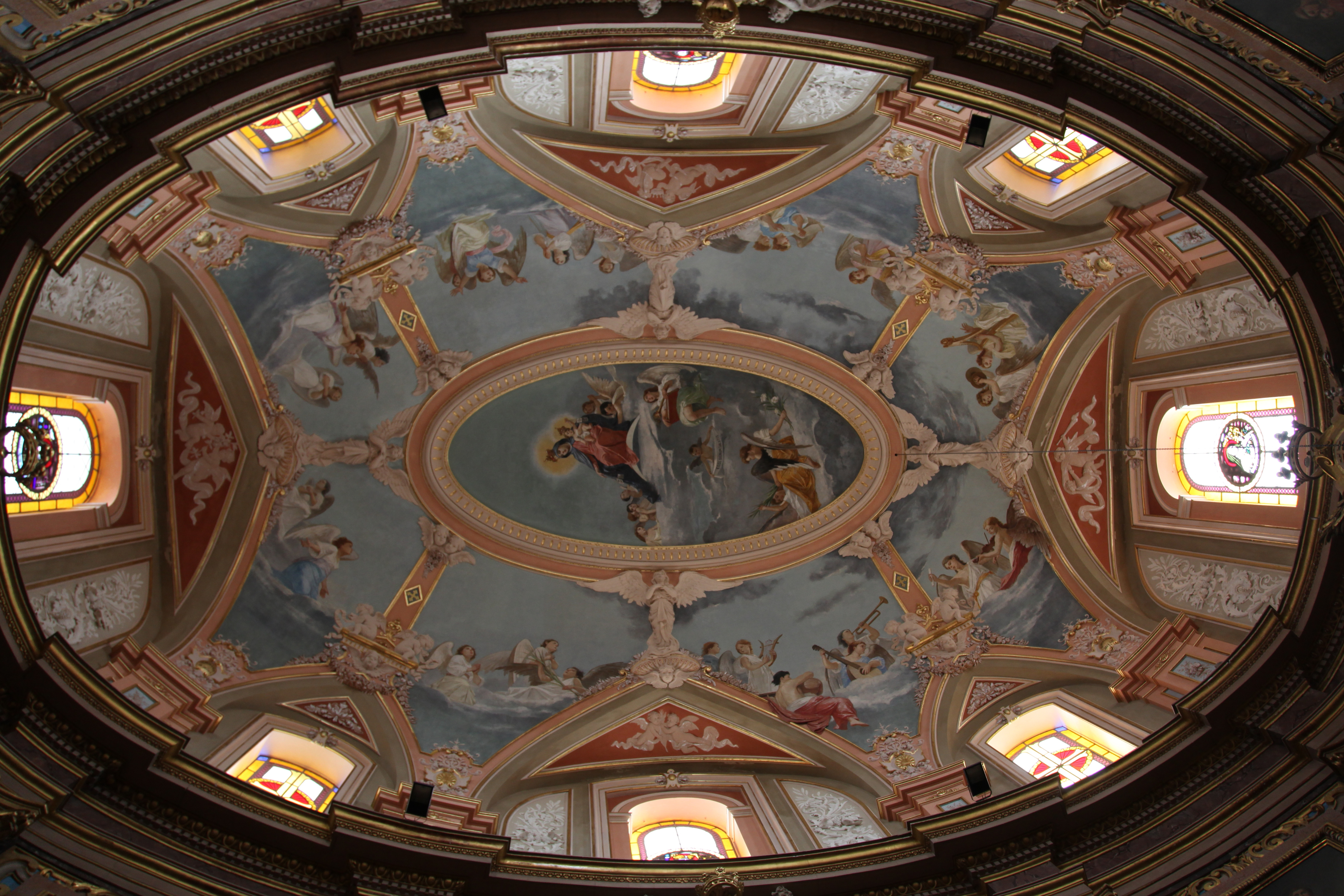
The dome

During the French occupation the church was ransacked by the French and valuables stolen to fund Napoleon's wars. However, it is said that on one particular occasion, as the French were on their way to steal the church's damask, some rebels locked the church doors and a boy went up to the spire to sound the alarm. Consequently, this event gave birth to the resistance against the French.

== Works of art ==
The interior is enriched with baroque sculpture and paintings by notable artists such as Mattia Preti, Stefano Erardi, Michele Bellanti and Giuseppe Calì. The ornately carved and gilded wooden frame around the titular painting is the work of Pietro Paolo Troisi, and the processional statue of Our Lady of Mount Carmel the work of Maltese sculptor Andrea Imbroll.

== See also ==
- Catholic Church in Malta
