= St Peter's Church and Monastery, Mdina =

St Peter's Church and Monastery
- Benedictine Monastery
- Il-Knisja u l-Monasteru ta' San Pietru
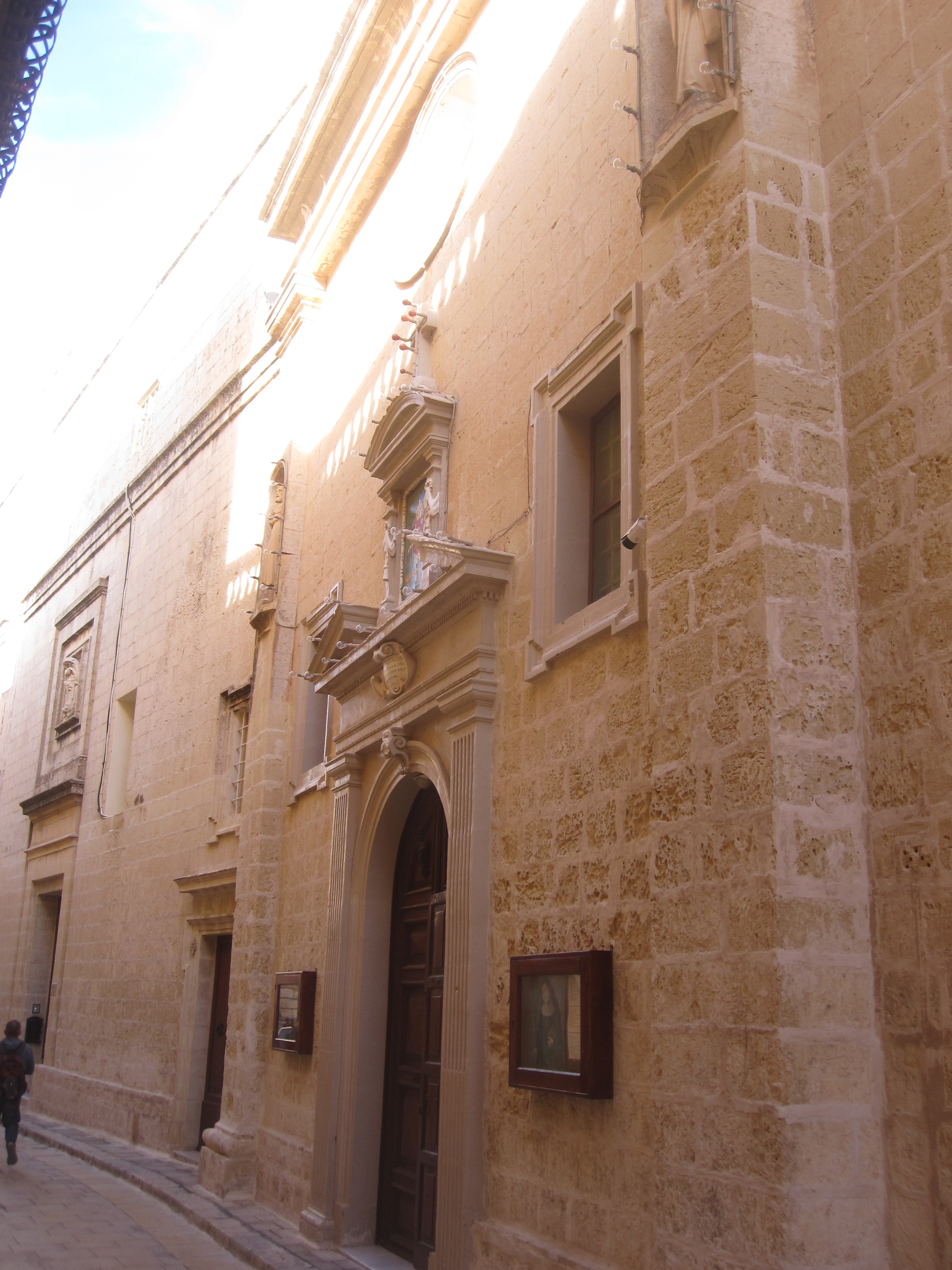

- Location within Malta
- 35°53′07.6″N 14°24′12.6″E
- Location: Mdina
- Country: Malta
- Denomination: Roman Catholic

History
- Status: Suppressed (2026)
- Founded: 1455
- Dedication: Saint Peter

Architecture
- Functional status: Monastery Church
- Style: Baroque
- Completed: 1625

Administration
- Archdiocese: Malta

Clergy
- Archbishop: Charles Scicluna

The Church and Monastery of St Peter (Maltese: Il-knisja u monasteru ta' San Pietru) is a Catholic church complex in Mdina, Malta. It formerly housed a Benedictine monastery for cloistered nuns. The church is dedicated to St Peter and St Benedict. In February 2026, the Holy See suppressed the monastery following the signing of long-term lease agreements without the required canonical authorisations. Administrative control of the property was transferred to the Abbot Primate of the Order of Saint Benedict.

== History ==
The monastery was founded by Pope Callixtus III in 1455 at the request of the citizens of Mdina, on the site of a medieval hospital. The present church as seen today was rebuilt by the nuns in around 1625 with the support of Bishop Baldassare Cagliares, whose coat of arms is displayed above the church door.

=== Interior of the church ===
The altarpiece if 1682 by the artist Mattia Preti depicts the Madonna and Child with Saint Peter, St Benedict and St Scholastica. Other works depict Our Lady of the Pillar, by Francesco Zahra. The altar was installed in the church in the 1740s, and is the work of Francesco Zahra, marmista Claudio Duranti, and bronzaro Marco Morelli. The church also holds the remains of the Blessed Maria Adeodata Pisani(1806–55), a cloistered nun who lived at the monastery in the 19th century. The Blessed Maria Adeodata Pisani was beatified by Pope John Paul II during his visit to Malta in May 2001.

A back wing of the monastery has been opened to the public as a museum. The rooms of the Blessed Adeodata Pisani at the monastery are also open to visitors.

=== Suppression ===
In February 2026, the Dicastery for Institutes of Consecrated Life and Societies of Apostolic Life informed the Archdiocese of Malta that St Peter’s Monastery was to be suppressed. The decision followed the discovery that the monastery’s sole occupant had signed two 50-year lease agreements with private individuals without the required canonical authorisations. According to statements reported by Maltese media, the leases were deemed invalid due to non-observance of the canonical regulations governing ecclesiastical property (canons 634–640 and 1290–1297 of the Code of Canon Law). The required authorisation of the local ordinary and licence of the Holy See were not obtained.

Archbishop Charles Scicluna referred the matter to the Holy See after attempts at resolution were unsuccessful. The Dicastery stated that "no solution remains other than to suppress the said monastery" and requested that the process be completed within 2026. Administrative authority over the property was transferred to Dom Jeremias Schröder, OSB, Abbot Primate of the Order of Saint Benedict. The monastery’s sole nun was to be transferred to another Benedictine monastery.
