= St Agatha's Chapel, Mdina =

Chapel of St Agatha
- The Church of Saint Agatha
- Kappella ta' Sant' Agata
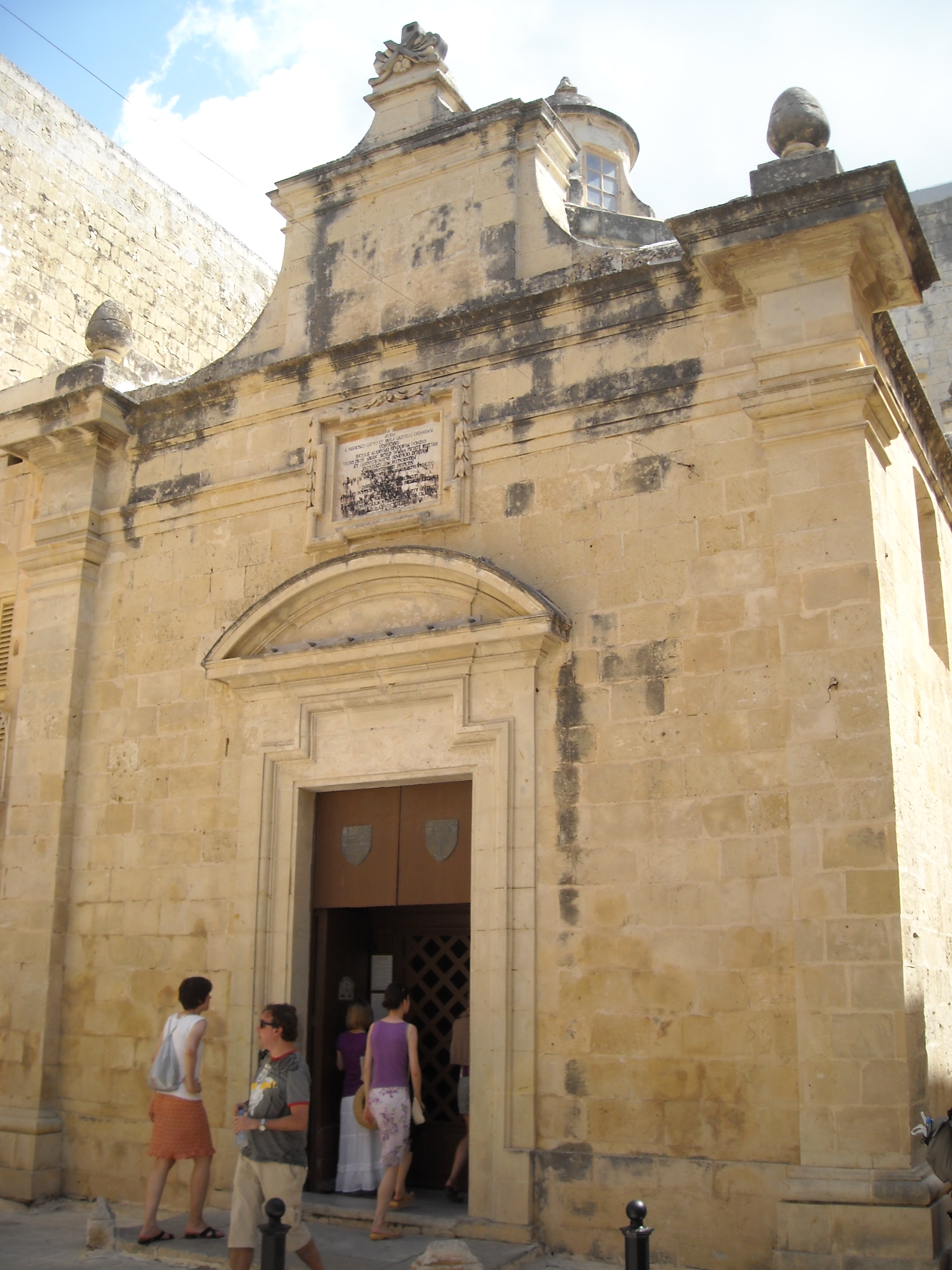

- Location within Malta
- 35°53′06.8″N 14°24′12.3″E
- Location: Mdina
- Country: Malta
- Denomination: Roman Catholic

History
- Founded: 1417
- Dedication: Saint Agatha
- Dedicated: 28 June 1695

Architecture
- Architect: Lorenzo Gafà
- Style: Baroque

Administration
- Archdiocese: Malta

Clergy
- Archbishop: Charles Scicluna

The Chapel of St Agatha is a small Roman Catholic church located in Mdina, the former capital city of Malta from antiquity to the medieval period.

== History ==
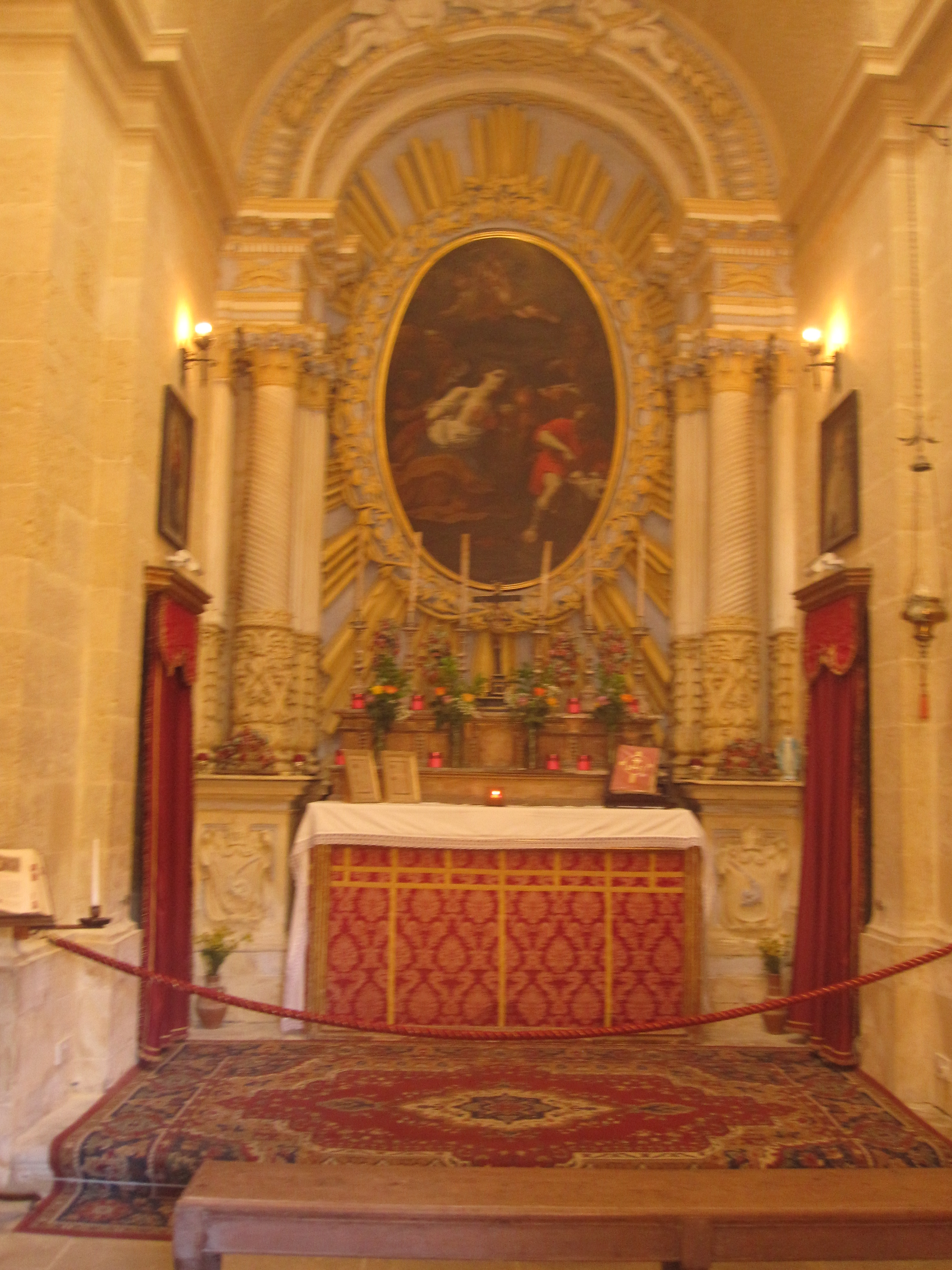
Interior of the chapel

The present structure dates from the 17th century; however, a much older church existed on its site. The original medieval chapel was built in 1417 by a nobleman, Francesco Gatto, and his wife, Paola de' Castelli. On 22 January 1575 the chapel was visited by inquisitor Pietro Dusina on his apostolic visit to Malta. Prior to 1661 the chapel was owned by the Gatto Murina family. In 1661 the chapel was given to the church in Malta. The medieval chapel was damaged in the 1693 Sicily earthquake which destroyed much of Mdina, including the medieval cathedral.

The new chapel was built on designs by renowned architect Lorenzo Gafà. The chapel was blessed by the Archdeacon Antonio Cauchi in the presence of Bishop Davide Cocco Palmieri and the Grand Master Adrien de Wignacourt, on 26 June 1696.

The titular painting depicts St Agatha, patroness of Malta, together with St Adrian, the work of Giuseppe D'Arena.
