= Palazzo Costanzo =

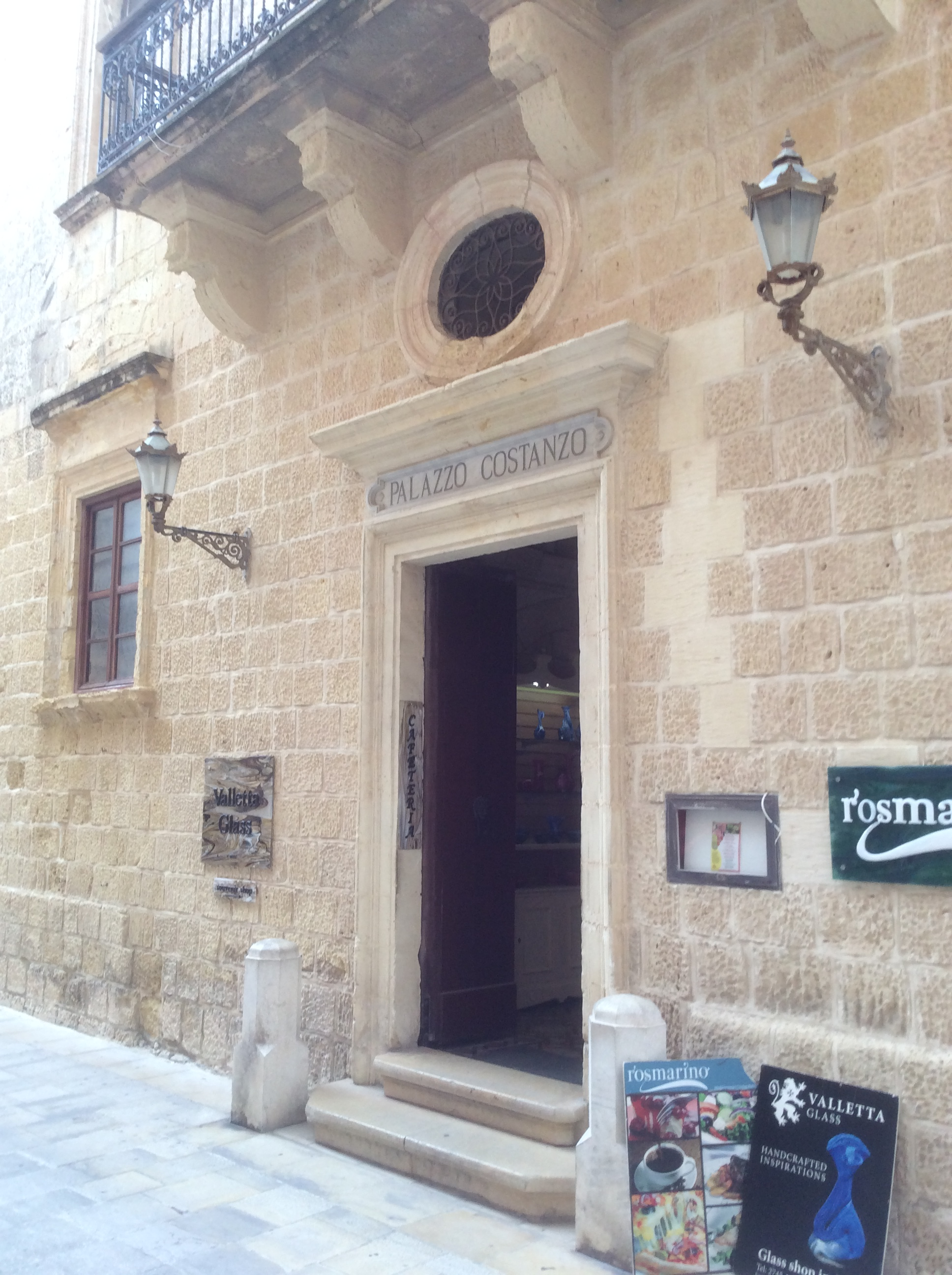
- Façade of Palazzo Costanzo
- Interactive map of the Palazzo Costanzo area

General information
- Status: Intact
- Type: Palace
- Location: Mdina, Malta
- Coordinates: 35°53′12.7″N 14°24′11.2″E
- Completed: 1666
- Client: Tomaso Costanzo

Technical details
- Material: Limestone
- Floor count: 2

Website
- www.palazzocostanzo.com

Palazzo Costanzo is a palace in Mdina, Malta, situated on Villegaignon Street. It was formerly the residence of a noble Sicilian family, having been constructed in 1666 by Tomaso Costanzo. The building, which is intact and well maintained, was later converted into a restaurant. It also hosts the Medieval Times Show, which provides an insight into local life in the 14th and 15th centuries.

The building has two floors along with underground cellars. Its façade is symmetrical, and it includes a rectangular doorway, above which is a small oval window and an open balcony. Two windows flank the door and balcony on either side. The corbels and surrounds of the doors and windows are decorated with simple designs.

It is scheduled as a Grade 1 monument and listed on the National Inventory of the Cultural Property of the Maltese Islands.
