= Mdina =

City in the Western Region of Malta

Mdina L-Imdina Città Notabile, Città Vecchia Ann, Melite, Melita
- City and Local council
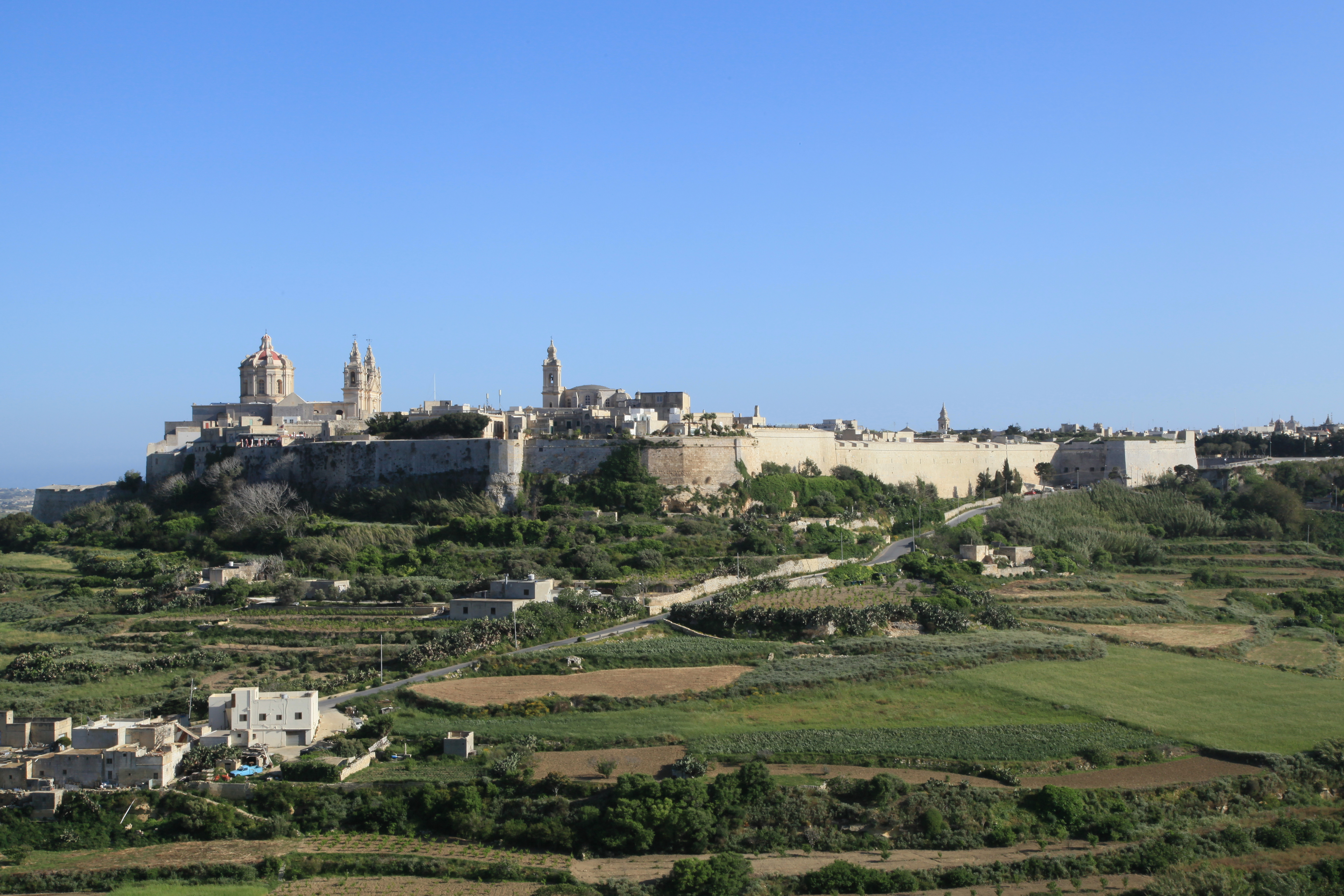
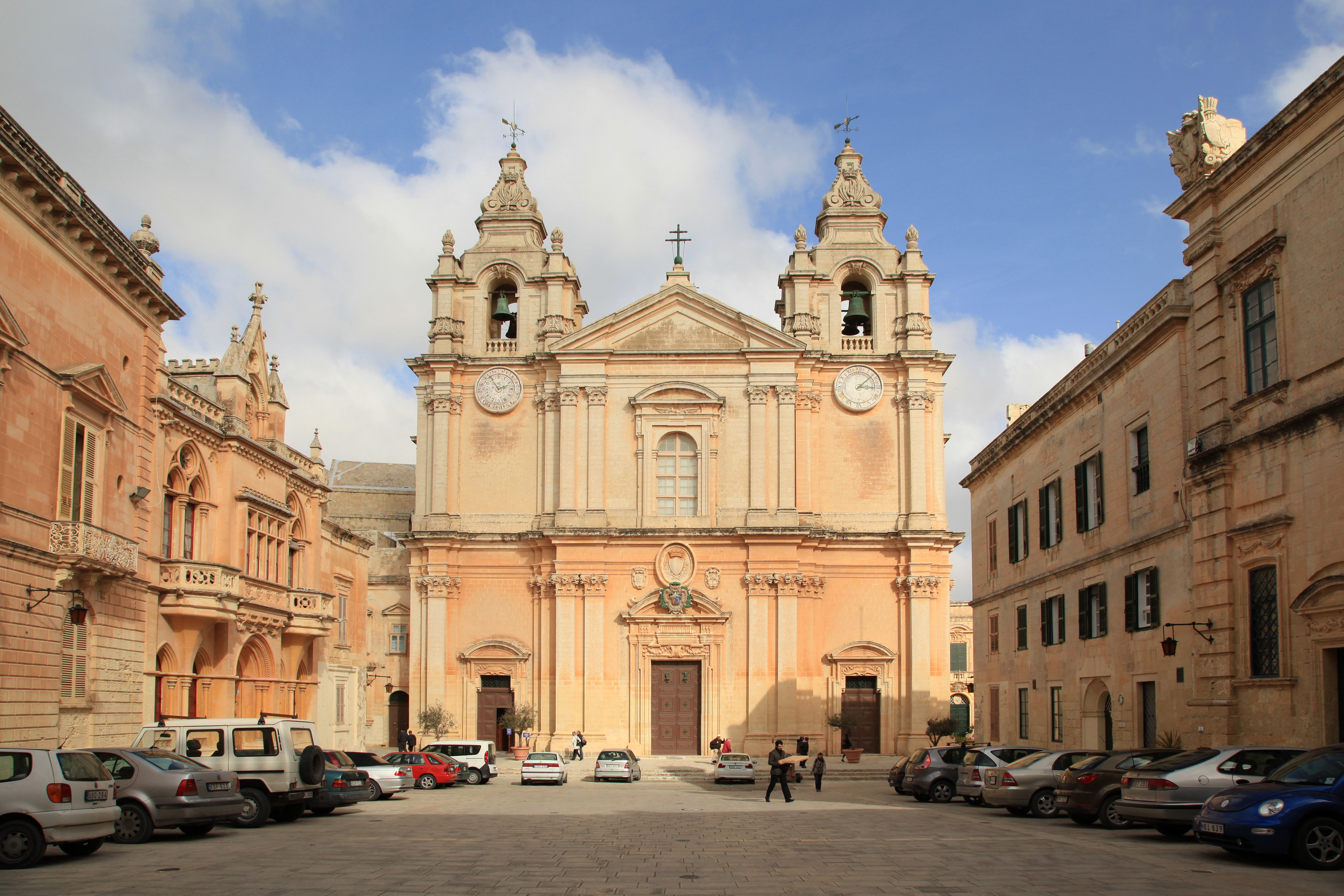
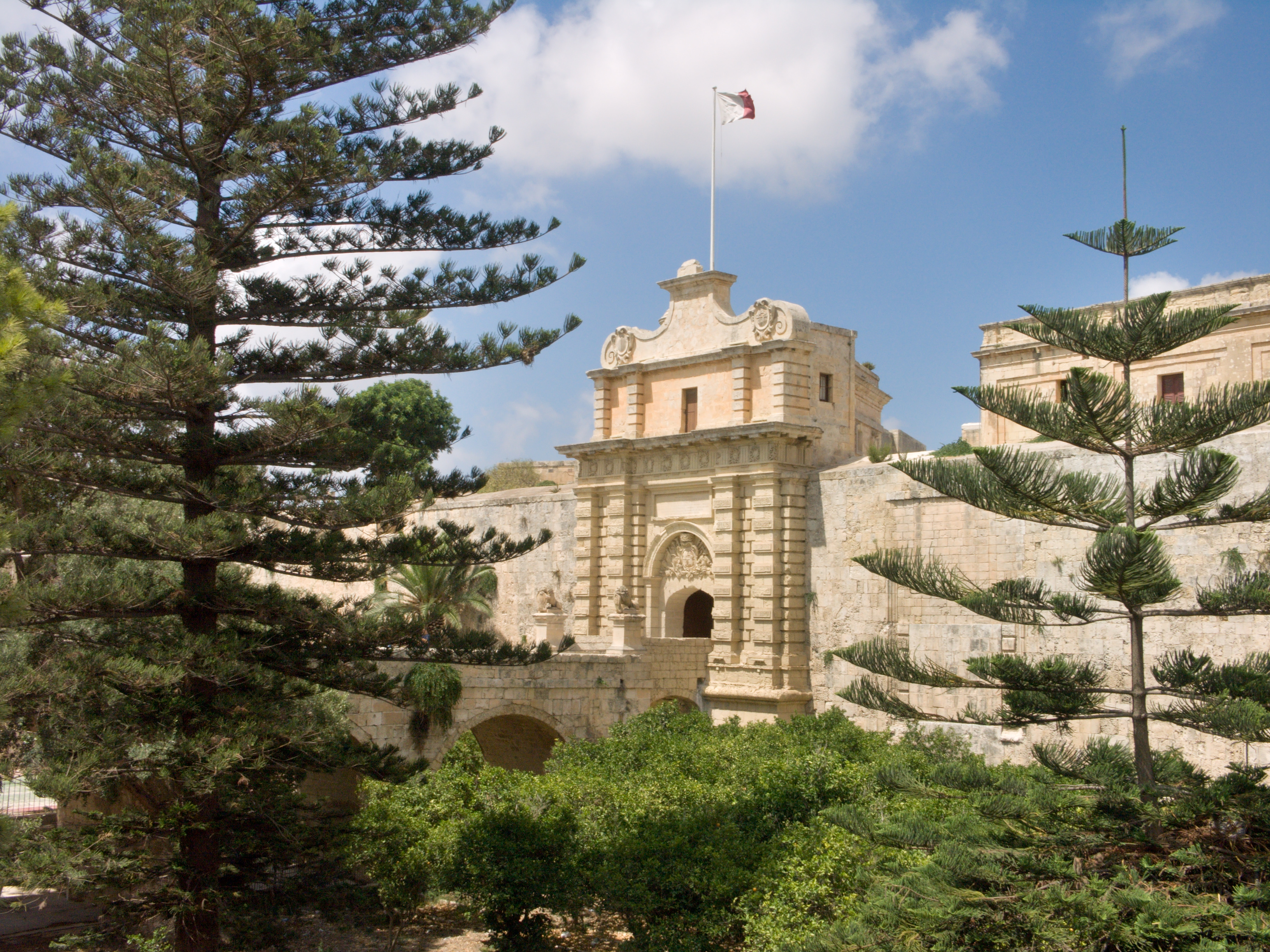
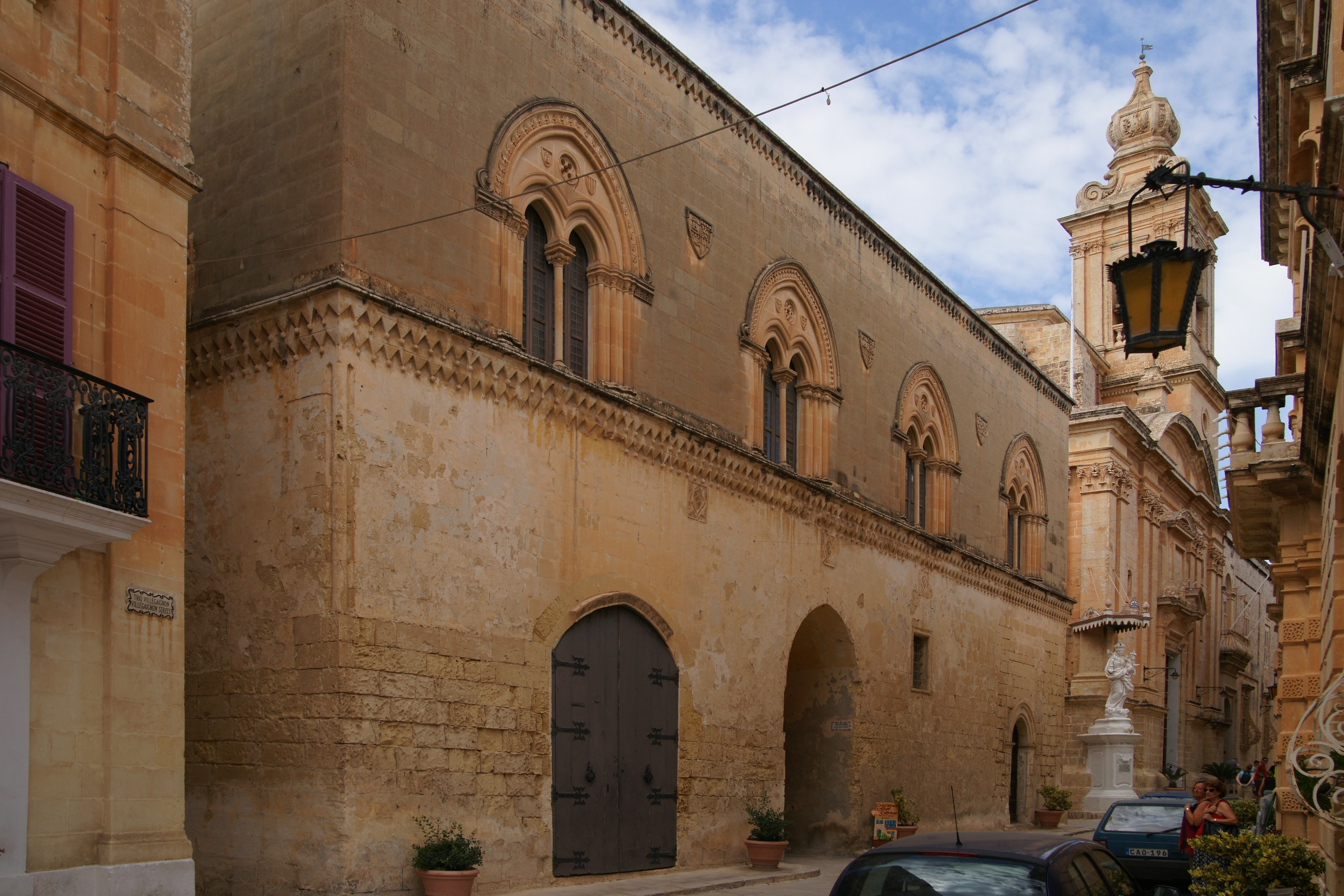
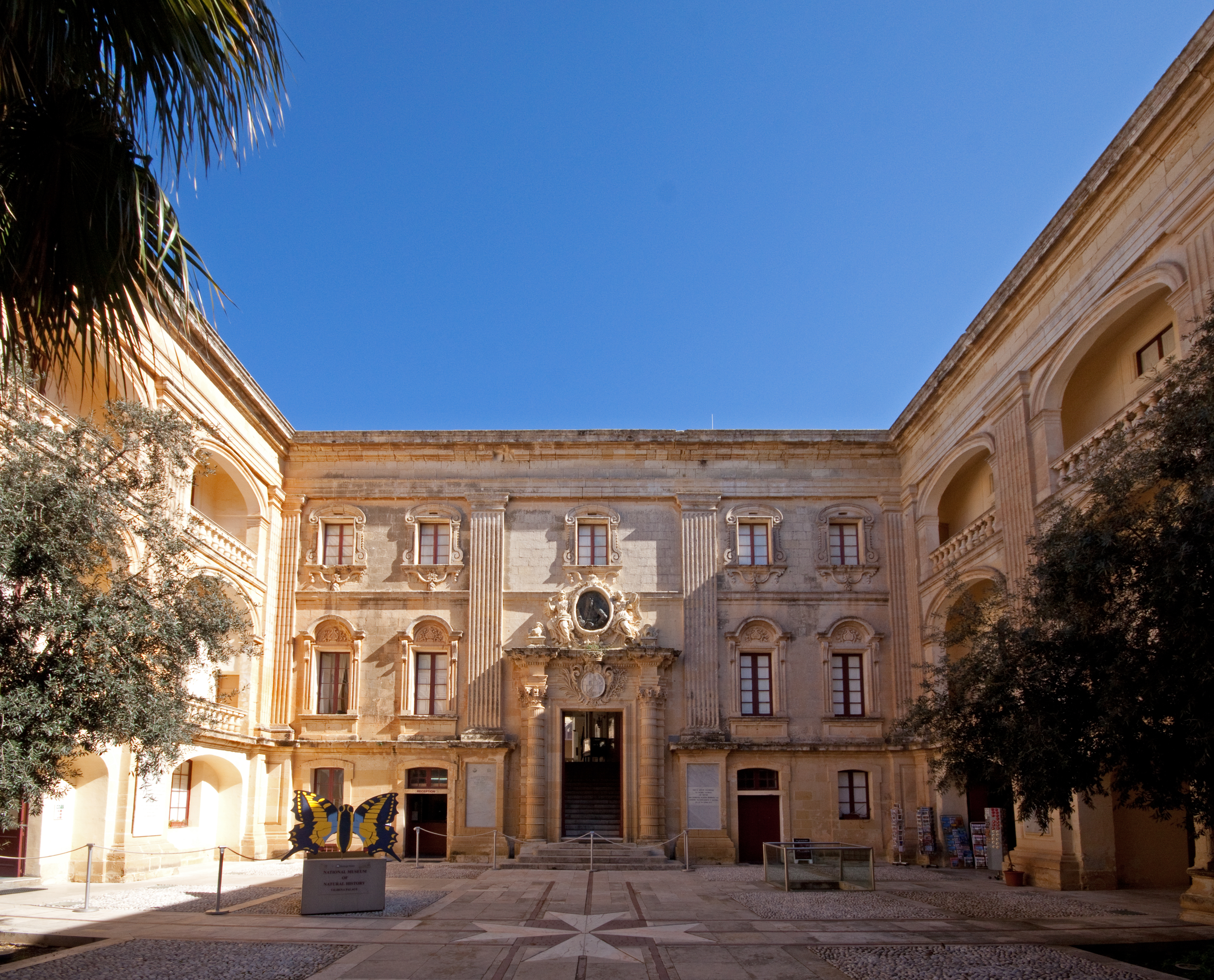
- From top: Skyline, Cathedral, Main Gate, Palazzo Santa Sofia, Palazzo Vilhena

- Flag Coat of arms
- Nickname: The Silent City

- Location within Mediterranean
- Coordinates: 35°53′9″N 14°24′11″E
- Country: Malta
- Region: Western Region
- District: Western District
- Established: c. 8th century BC as Ann c. 11th century AD as Mdina
- Borders: Attard, Mtarfa, Rabat

Government
  - Mayor: Peter Sant Manduca (PN)

Area
  - Total: 0.9 km^{2} (0.35 sq mi)

Population (Jul. 2024)
  - Total: 242
  - Density: 270/km^{2} (700/sq mi)
- Demonym(s): Midjan (m), Midjana (f), Midjani (pl)
- Time zone: UTC+1 (CET)
  - Summer (DST): UTC+2 (CEST)
- Postal code: MDN
- Dialing code: 356
- ISO 3166 code: MT-29
- Patron saints: St. Peter; St. Paul; Our Lady of Mount Carmel
- Day of festa: 29 June; 4th Sunday of July
- Buses 50, 51, 52, 53, 56 from Valletta terminus, stop at bus stop named "Rabat 3"

Mdina (Maltese: L-Imdina [lɪmˈdiːnɐ]), also known by its Italian epithets Città Vecchia ("Old City") and Città Notabile ("Notable City"), is a fortified city in the Western Region of Malta which was the island's capital from antiquity to the medieval period. The city has not spread beyond its ancient walls, and had a population of 242 as of July 2024. This included 120 males and 122 females; 166 Maltese nationals and 76 foreign nationals.

A natural redoubt, the area of the city has been inhabited since prehistory. A Phoenician colony known as Ann (Phoenician: 𐤀𐤍𐤍, ʾnn) was established around the 8th century BC, sharing its name with the island and presumably acting as its capital. During the Punic Wars, the town was acquired by the Romans and renamed Melita (Ancient Greek: Μελίτη, romanized: Melítē) after the Greek and Latin name for the island, probably taken from the Punic port at Cospicua on the Grand Harbour. Greco-Roman Melite was larger than present-day Mdina. It was reduced to its present size during the period of Byzantine or Arab rule. Following a 9th-century massacre, the area was largely uninhabited until its refounding in the 11th century as Madīnah, from which the town's current name derives. Mdina then continued to serve as the capital of Malta until the arrival of the Order of St. John in 1530, who established their capital at Birgu instead. Mdina experienced a period of decline over the following centuries, although it saw a revival in the early 18th century during which several Baroque buildings were erected.

Mdina remained the centre of the Maltese nobility and religious authorities, and property largely continues to be passed down in families from generation to generation. The city has never regained the importance it had before 1530, giving rise to the popular nickname the "Silent City" among both locals and visitors. Mdina, having largely maintained its medieval character, is on the tentative list of UNESCO World Heritage Sites, and has become one of the main tourist attractions in Malta.

== Etymology ==
The name of the city derives from the Arabic word madīnah (مدينة), meaning "town" or "city". The name Melite or Melita, associated with the former ancient settlement on the same site, has survived as the name of the island (Malta).

== History ==
=== Antiquity ===
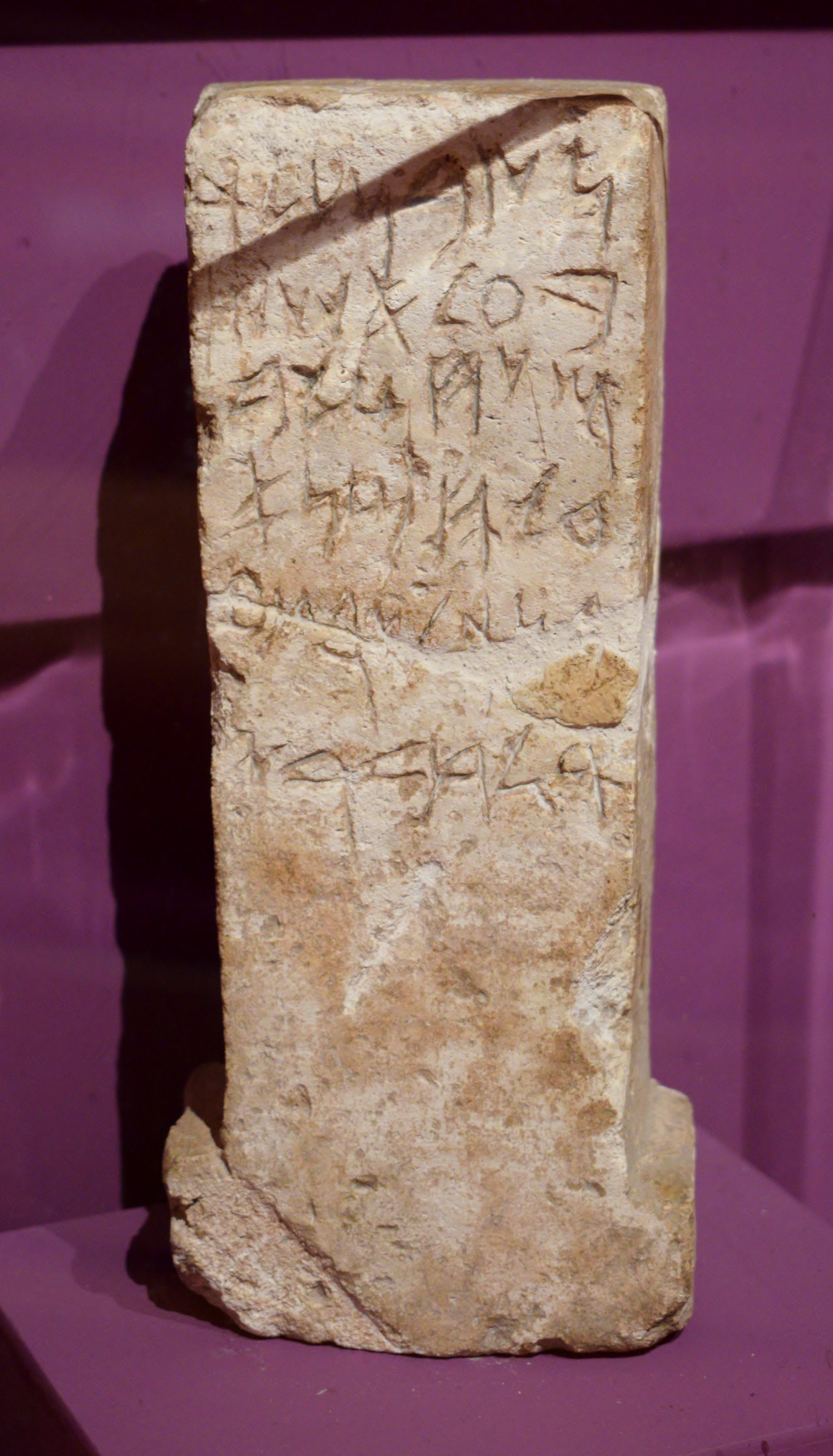
The Mdina stele attests to Malta's Phoenician past

The plateau on which Mdina is built has been inhabited since prehistory, and by the Bronze Age it was a place of refuge since it was naturally defensible. The Phoenicians established a colony at the site, known as Ann after their name for the island, around the 8th century BC. The Roman Republic captured Malta in 218 BC, early in the Second Punic War. They continued to use Mdina as their centre of administration but renamed it Melita after the Greek and Latin name for the island, probably taken from the main Punic port on the Grand Harbour. The Punico-Roman city was about three times the size of present-day Mdina, extending into a large part of modern Rabat.

According to the Acts of the Apostles, Paul the Apostle was shipwrecked on Malta in AD 60, greeted by its governor Publius, and miraculously cured the governor's sick father before leaving. Christian legend holds that the population of Malta then converted to Christianity, with Publius becoming Bishop of Malta and then Bishop of Athens before being martyred in 112.

Very few remains of the Punico-Roman city survive today. The most significant are the ruins of the Domus Romana, in which several well-preserved mosaics, statues and other remains were discovered. Remains of the podium of a Temple of Apollo, fragments of the city walls and some other sites have also been excavated.

=== Medieval period ===
At some point following the fall of the Western Roman Empire, a retrenchment was built within the city, reducing it to its present size. This was done to make the city's perimeter more easily defensible, and similar reductions in city sizes were common around the Mediterranean region in the early Middle Ages. Although it was traditionally assumed that the retrenchment was built by the Arabs, it has been suggested that it was actually built by the Byzantine Empire in around the 8th century, when the threat from the Arabs increased.

In 870, Byzantine Melite, which was ruled by governor Amros (probably Ambrosios), was besieged by Aghlabids led by Halaf al-Hādim. He was killed in the fighting, and Sawāda Ibn Muḥammad was sent from Sicily to continue the siege following his death. The duration of the siege is unknown, but it probably lasted for some weeks or months. After Melite fell to the invaders, the inhabitants were massacred, the city was destroyed and its churches were looted. Marble from Melite's churches was used to build the castle of Sousse (Ribat of Sousse, Tunisia) .

According to Al-Himyarī, Malta remained almost uninhabited until it was resettled in 1048 or 1049 by Muslims from Sicily and their slaves, who built a settlement called Madina on the site of Melite. Archaeological evidence suggests that the city was already a thriving Muslim settlement by the beginning of the 11th century, so 1048–49 might be the date when the city was officially founded and its walls were constructed. The layout of the new city was completely different to that of ancient Melite. Some aspects of present-day Mdina's layout, such as its narrow and maze-like streets, may still reflect the legacy of this period and share some similarities with historic North African medinas.

The Byzantines besieged Medina in 1053–54, but were repelled by its defenders. The city surrendered peacefully to Roger I of Sicily after a short siege in 1091, and Malta was subsequently incorporated into the County and later the Kingdom of Sicily, being dominated by a succession of feudal lords. A castle known as the Castellu di la Chitati was built on the southeast corner of the city near the main entrance, probably on the site of an earlier Byzantine fort.

In the 12th century, the town's fortifications were rebuilt and expanded. By this time, the city had also been reduced to around its present-day size. The area to the south that had formerly been part of Roman Melite, now situated outside the city walls, was turned into a suburb, present-day Rabat.

The population of Malta during the fifteenth century was about 10,000, with town life limited to Mdina, Birgu and the Gozo Citadel. Mdina was comparatively small and partly uninhabited and by 1419, it was already outgrown by its suburb, Rabat. Under Aragonese rule, local government rested on the Università, a communal body based in Mdina, which collected taxation and administered the islands' limited resources. At various points during the fifteenth century, this town council complained to its Aragonese overlords that the islands were at the mercy of the sea and the saracens.

The city withstood a siege by Hafsid invaders in 1429. While the exact number of casualties or Maltese who were carried into slavery is unknown, the islands suffered depopulation in this raid.

=== Hospitaller rule ===
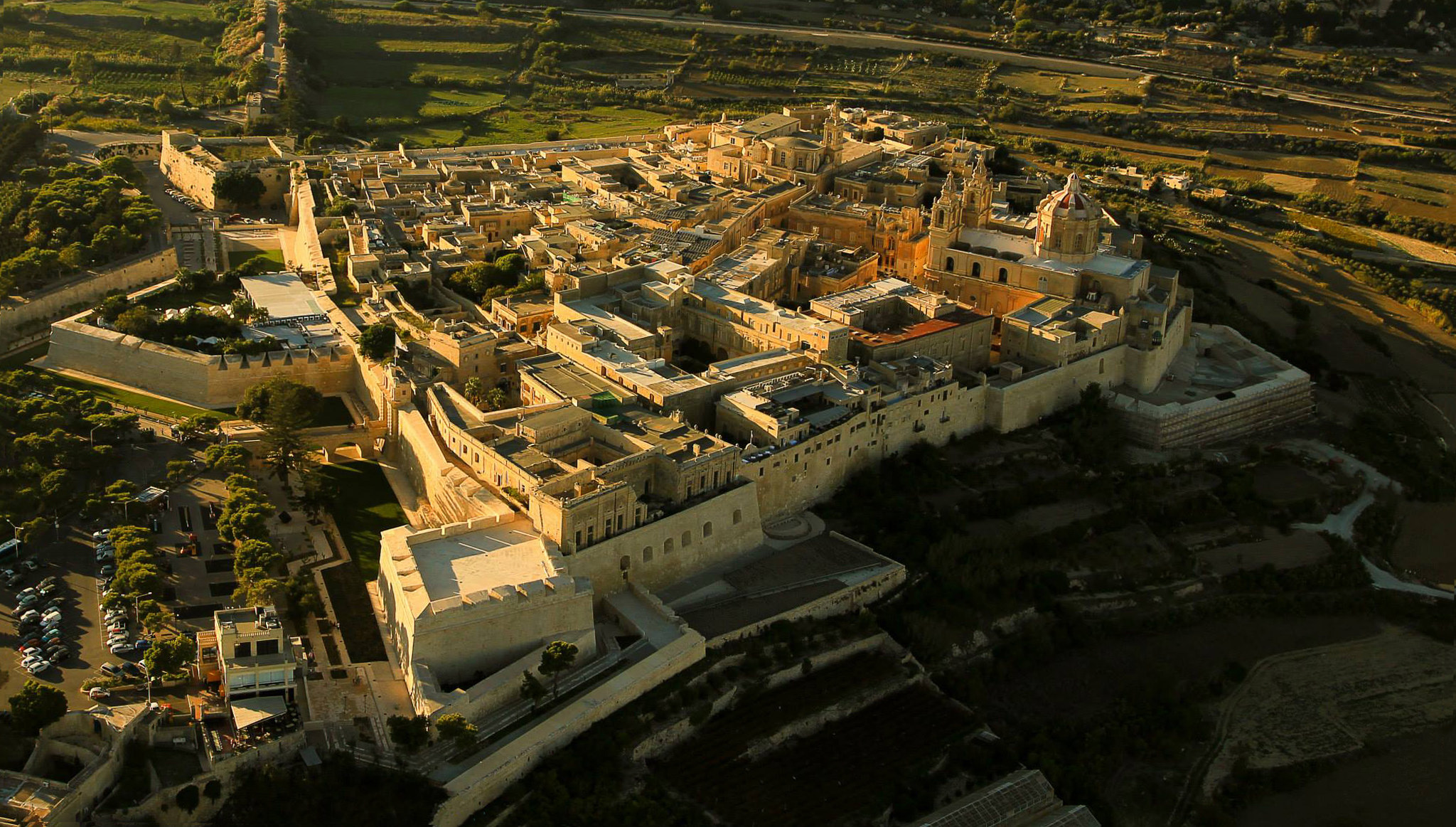
Aerial view of Mdina and its fortifications

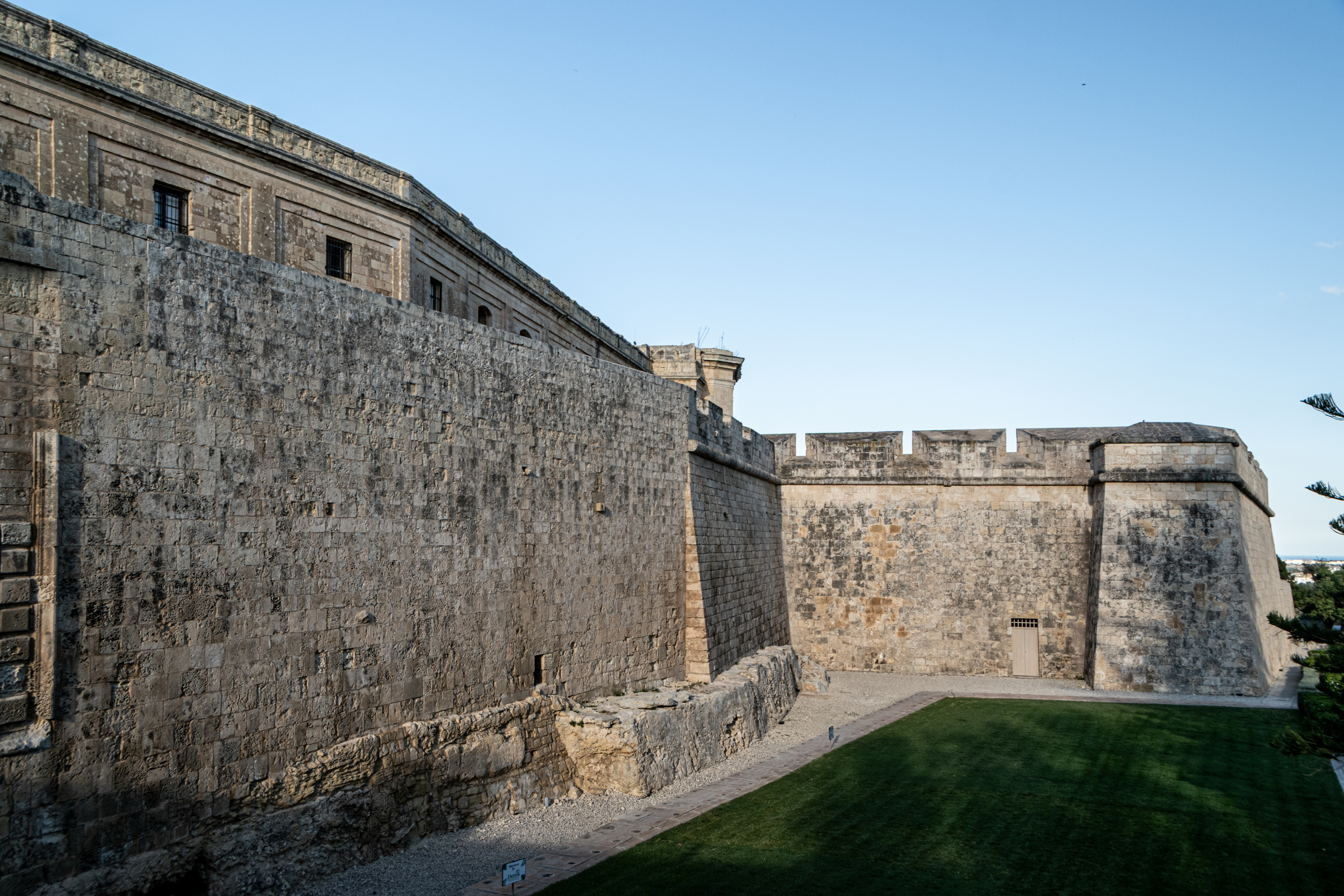
Southern bastion and wall of Mdina

When the Order of Saint John took over in Malta in 1530, the nobles ceremoniously handed over the keys of the city to Grand Master Philippe Villiers de L'Isle-Adam, but the Order settled in Birgu and Mdina lost its status as capital city. In the 1540s, the fortifications began to be upgraded during the magistracy of Juan de Homedes y Coscon, and in 1551 the city withstood a brief Ottoman siege.

During the Great Siege of Malta in 1565, Mdina was the base of the Order's cavalry, which made occasional sorties on the invading Ottomans. On 7 August 1565, the cavalry attacked the unprotected Ottoman field hospital, which led to the invaders abandoning a major assault on the main fortifications in Birgu and Senglea. The Ottomans attempted to take Mdina in September so as to winter there, but abandoned their plans when the city fired its cannon inefficiently at a much longer range than normal, leading them to believe that it had ammunition to spare. After the siege, Maltese military engineer Girolamo Cassar drew up plans to reduce Mdina's size by half and turning it into a fortress, but these were never implemented due to protests by the city's nobles. The fortifications were again upgraded in the mid-17th century, when the large De Redin Bastion was built at the centre of the land front.

Mdina suffered severe damage during the 1693 Sicily earthquake; although no casualties were reported, the 13th-century Cathedral of St. Paul was partially destroyed, and it was rebuilt by Lorenzo Gafà in the Baroque style between 1697 and 1703.

On 3 November 1722, newly elected Grand Master António Manoel de Vilhena issued orders for the restoration and renovation of Mdina. This renovation was entrusted to the French architect and military engineer Charles François de Mondion, who introduced strong French Baroque elements into what was still a largely medieval city. At this point, large parts of the fortifications and the city entrance were completely rebuilt. The remains of the Castellu di la Chitati were demolished to make way for Palazzo Vilhena, while the main gate was walled up and a new Mdina Gate was built nearby. Several public buildings were also built, including the Banca Giuratale and the Corte Capitanale. The last major addition to the Mdina fortifications was Despuig Bastion, which was completed in 1746.

=== French occupation and British rule ===
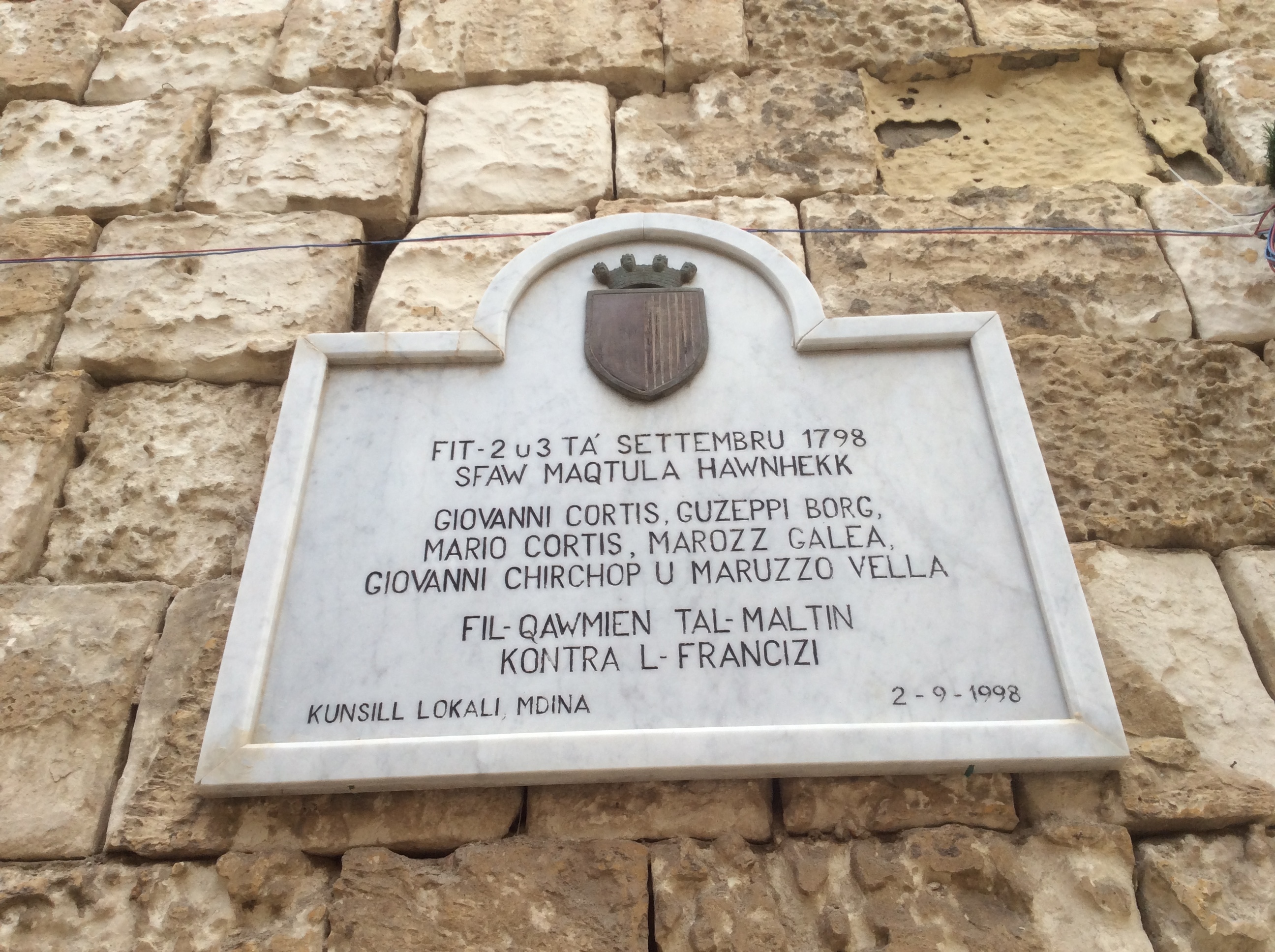
Plaque near the Torre dello Standardo commemorating six Maltese people who were killed during the uprising of September 1798

On 10 June 1798, Mdina was captured by French forces without much resistance during the French invasion of Malta. A French garrison remained in the city, but a Maltese uprising broke out on 2 September of that year. The following day, rebels entered the city through a sally port and massacred the garrison of 65 men. These events marked the beginning of a two-year uprising and blockade, and the Maltese set up a National Assembly which met at Mdina's Banca Giuratale. The rebels were successful, and in 1800 the French surrendered and Malta became a British protectorate.

From 1883 to 1931, Mdina was linked with Valletta by the Malta Railway.

=== Present day ===
Today, Mdina is one of Malta's major tourist attractions, hosting about 1.5 million tourists a year. No cars (other than a limited number of residents, emergency vehicles, wedding cars and horses) are allowed in Mdina, partly why it has earned the nickname 'the Silent City' (Maltese: Il-Belt Siekta). The city displays an unusual mix of Norman and Baroque architecture, including several palaces, most of which serve as private homes.

An extensive restoration of the city walls was undertaken between 2008 and 2016.

== Government ==
Mdina Local Council
- Coat of arms or logo

Type
- Type: Local Council

History
- Founded: 30 June 1993

Leadership
- Mayor: Peter Joseph dei Conti Sant Manduca, PN
- Vice-Mayor: Joseph Debono, PN
- Minority Leader: Mary Anne Sultana, PL

Structure
- Political groups: Administration: Nationalist Party (4); Minority: Labour Party (1)

Elections
- Last election: 2024 (Same 5 councillors elected unopposed since 2013)
- Next election: 2029

=== Local Council ===
Mdina is governed by a directly elected five-member Local Council. The Nationalist Party has always had the majority of seats and all mayors of Mdina have come from this party, with the Labour Party holding either one, two or no seats at all since the inception of the council. Peter Joseph Sant Manduca, Count of Sant Manduca, (Note: Peter Joseph dei Conti Sant Manduca is the name he registers in local council elections.) has been Mayor of Mdina since 2003. The 2019 election did not happen as only five nominations (therefore equalling the total amount of seats) were submitted.

== Places of interest ==
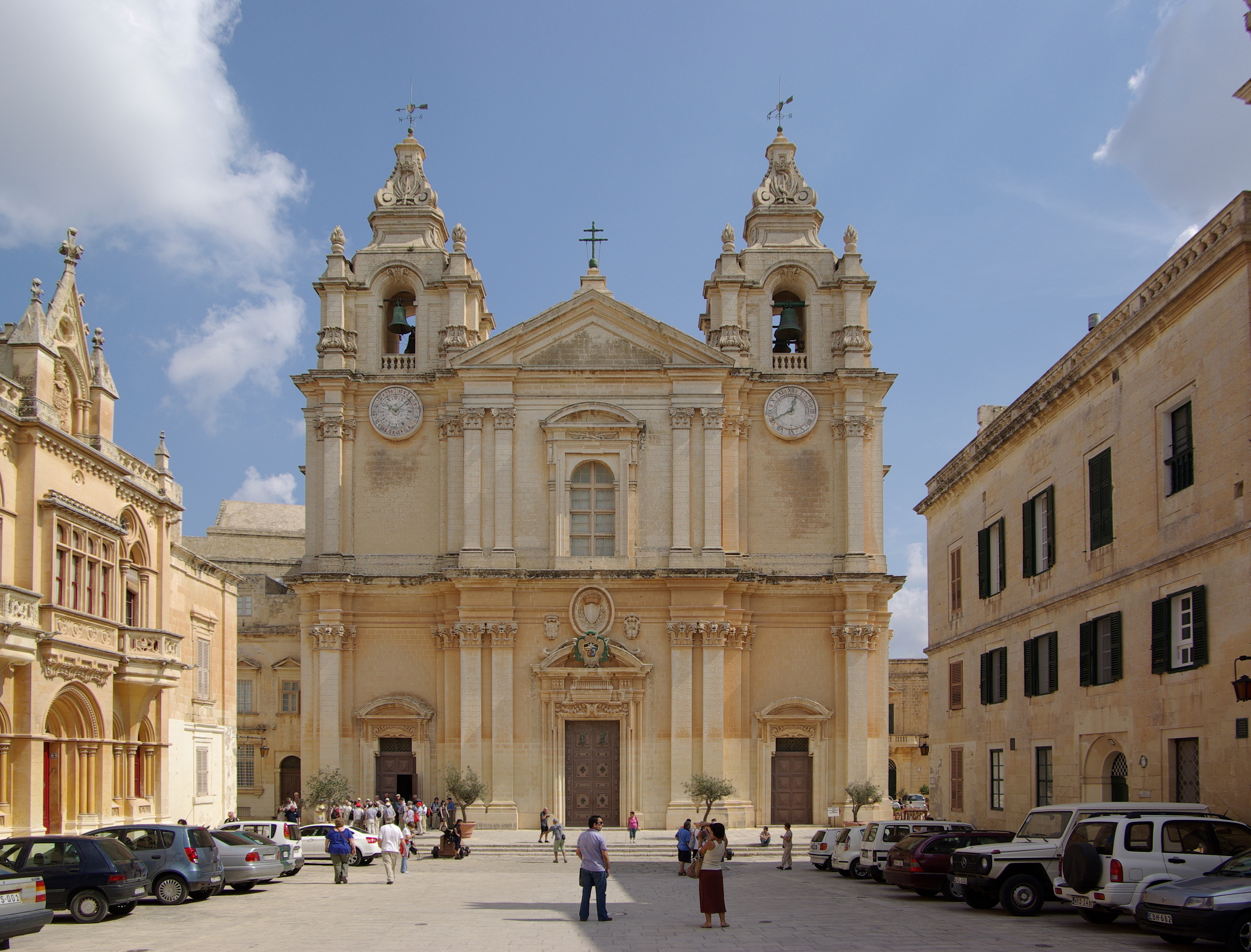
St. Paul's Cathedral

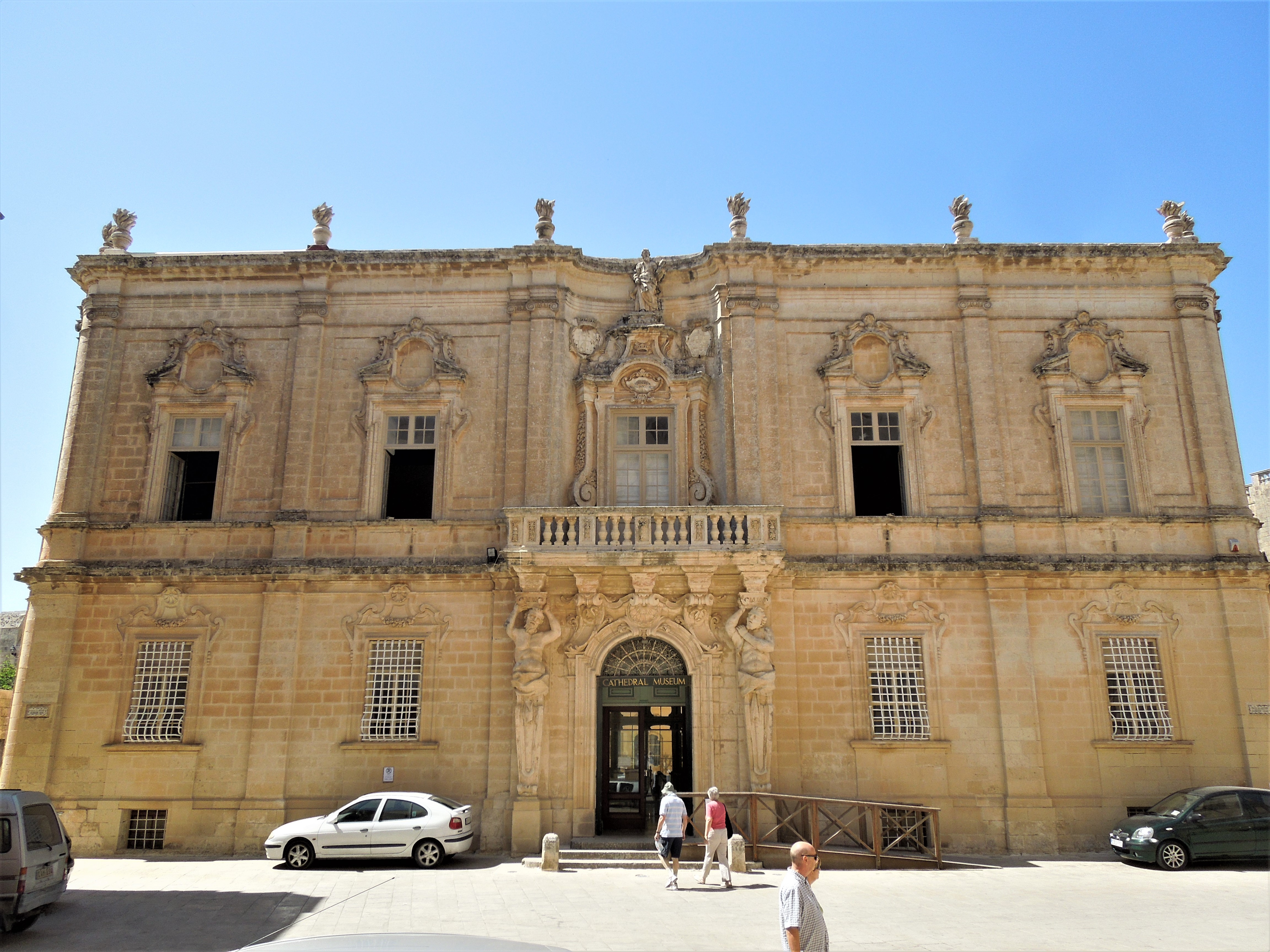
Cathedral Museum

The following are a number of historic and monumental buildings around Mdina:

- The city walls, including Mdina Gate, Greeks Gate and the Torre dello Standardo
- St. Paul's Cathedral
- St. Paul's Catacombs
- Palazzo Vilhena (National Museum of Natural History)
- Palazzo Falson (Norman House)
- Palazzo Gatto Murina
- Palazzo Santa Sofia
- Palazzo Costanzo
- Banca Giuratale
- Corte Capitanale (city hall)
- St. Agatha's Chapel
- St. Nicholas' Chapel
- St Roque's Church
- Mdina Dungeons
- Carmelite Church & Convent
- Mdina Experience
- St Peter's Church and Monastery
- Bastion Square
- Domvs Romana, ruins of a Roman townhouse just outside the city
- Casa Gourgion

== Sports ==
Founded in 2006, the Mdina Knights play in the third division league of the Malta Football Association.

== Streets in Mdina ==
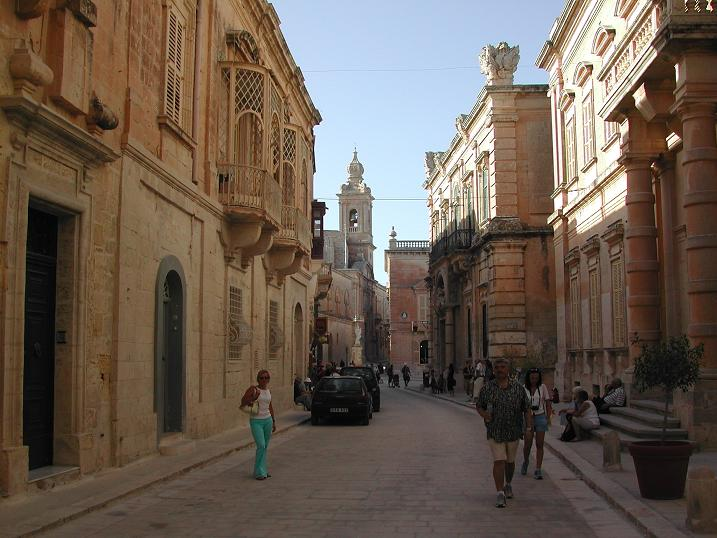
Villegaignon Street, with the Banca Giuratale visible in the centre

- Misraħ il-Kunsill (Council Square)
- Pjazza San Pawl (St Paul Square)
- Pjazza San Publiju (St Publius Square)
- Pjazza tal-Arċisqof (Archbishop Square)
- Pjazza tas-Sur (Bastion Square)
- Pjazzetta Beata Marija Adeodata Pisani (Blessed Maria Adeodata Pisani Square)
- Triq Inguanez (Inguanez Street)
- Triq Mesquita (Mesquita Street)
- Triq is-Sur (Bastion Street)
- Triq San Pawl (St Paul Street)
- Triq Santu Rokku (St Roch Street)
- Triq l-Imħażen (Magazines' Street)
- Triq Villegaignon (Villegaignon Street) (Main road).

== In popular culture ==
- Mdina (together with Birgu and Gozo) plays a significant role in The Disorderly Knights, the third book of the acclaimed Lymond Chronicles by Dorothy Dunnett, which is set around the events of the Dragut Raid of 1551 when the Ottomans briefly besieged the city.
- In White Wolf Publishing's World of Darkness, Mdina is the European capital of clan Lasombra.
- In the 2007 novel Snakehead by Anthony Horowitz, Mdina is the site of an "ambush" where MI6 intends to retrieve Alex Rider's father John.
- In the first season of HBO's Game of Thrones, Mdina was the filming location for the series' fictional capital city of King's Landing. More specifically, Mesquita Square is the shooting location of Littlefinger's brothel and the town's baroque gate can be seen in the first season (episode 3).
- The action of several chapters (21ff) of A.J. Hackwith's fantasy novel The Library of the Unwritten (2019) is set in Mdina; the city has a special status in that "Nothing not born of humankind - not angel or demon [...] - gets in without invitation from its residents" (p. 186).

== Notable people ==
- Pietru Caxaro - philosopher and poet
- Gasper Grima - philosopher
- John Constance Parnis - philosopher
- Francesco Azopardi - composer and music theorist
- Joseph Calleia - actor and singer
