= List of monuments in Rabat, Malta =

This is a list of monuments in Rabat, Malta, which are listed on the National Inventory of the Cultural Property of the Maltese Islands.

== List ==
| Name of object | Location | Coordinates | ID | Photo | Upload |
|---|---|---|---|---|---|
| Nadur Tower | Binġemma Gap | 35°54′02″N 14°22′16″E | 00060 | Nadur Tower | Upload Photo |
| Villa Marija | It-Telgħa tas-Saqqajja / Taraġ tas-Saqqajja | 35°53′00″N 14°24′15″E | 01195 | Villa Marija | Upload Photo |
| Ghajn Hammam Wash House | Triq Għajn Hammam | 35°53′10″N 14°24′00″E | 01197 | Ghajn Hammam Wash House | Upload Photo |
| Villa Luginsland | 61–65 Triq Ġorġ Borġ Olivier | 35°52′46″N 14°24′04″E | 01200 | Villa Luginsland | Upload Photo |
| Church of the Immaculate Conception | Wied Gerżuma, Tal-Kunċizzjoni | 35°53′59″N 14°20′58″E | 2323 | Church of the Immaculate Conception | Upload Photo |
| Church of St Martin of Tours | Triq Patri Tumas Xerri, Baħrija | 35°53′45″N 14°20′56″E | 2324 | Church of St Martin of Tours | Upload Photo |
| Chapel of St Martin of Tours | Trejqet it-Tin, Baħrija | 35°53′45″N 14°20′49″E | 2325 | Chapel of St Martin of Tours | Upload Photo |
| Church of the Immaculate and St Anthony the Abbot (Ghemieri) | Palazzo Gomerino | 35°53′40″N 14°22′11″E | 2326 | | Upload Photo |
| Church of the Nativity of the Virgin Mary | Triq Għajn Qajjet | 35°53′29″N 14°22′52″E | 2327 | Church of the Nativity of the Virgin Mary | Upload Photo |
| Church of the Nativity of the Madonna | L-Imtaħleb | 35°52′49″N 14°21′18″E | 2328 | Church of the Nativity of the Madonna | Upload Photo |
| Chapel of St Catherine | Triq Santa Katerina, Tad-Daħla | 35°52′14″N 14°23′05″E | 2329 | Chapel of St Catherine | Upload Photo |
| Niche of the Madonna of Sorrows | Triq Santa Katerina, Tad-Daħla | 35°52′13″N 14°23′03″E | 2330 | Niche of the Madonna of Sorrows | Upload Photo |
| Chapel of St Nicholas and St Lucy | Triq il-Buskett, Buskett | 35°51′44″N 14°24′10″E | 2331 | Chapel of St Nicholas and St Lucy | Upload Photo |
| Niche of St Paul | Is-Saqqajja | 35°52′58″N 14°24′11″E | 2332 | Niche of St Paul | Upload Photo |
| Chapel of San Mikiel Is-Sanċir | | 35°53′16″N 14°23′15″E | 2333 | Chapel of San Mikiel Is-Sanċir | Upload Photo |
| Chapel of the Society of the Sacred Heart | Triq tal-Virtu | 35°52′29″N 14°24′10″E | 2334 | Chapel of the Society of the Sacred Heart | Upload Photo |
| Church of the Mater Admirabilis | Triq tal-Virtu (The Archbishop Seminary) | 35°52′27″N 14°24′10″E | 2335 | | Upload Photo |
| Chapel of St Anthony | Ċimiterju Sta. Margerita, Wesgħa tal-Mużew | 35°53′06″N 14°23′59″E | 2336 | Chapel of St Anthony | Upload Photo |
| Statue of St Joseph | Wesgħa tal-Mużew | 35°53′05″N 14°24′03″E | 2337 | Statue of St Joseph | Upload Photo |
| Dejma Cross | Howard Gardens, Triq tal-Mużew | 35°53′02″N 14°24′11″E | 2338 | Dejma Cross | Upload Photo |
| Church of St Mark | Triq Santu Wistin | 35°52′58″N 14°24′08″E | 2339 | Church of St Mark | Upload Photo |
| Relief of the Madonna | 2 Triq Santu Wistin | 35°52′58″N 14°24′09″E | 2340 | Relief of the Madonna | Upload Photo |
| Statue of St Anthony the Abbot | Triq Santu Wistin c/w Vjal Santu Wistin | 35°52′58″N 14°24′09″E | 2341 | Statue of St Anthony the Abbot | Upload Photo |
| Statue of St Augustine | Triq Santu Wistin c/w Vjal Santu Wistin | 35°52′59″N 14°24′09″E | 2342 | Statue of St Augustine | Upload Photo |
| Statue of the Madonna of the Girdle | Triq Santu Wistin c/w Vjal Santu Wistin | 35°52′59″N 14°24′08″E | 2343 | Statue of the Madonna of the Girdle | Upload Photo |
| Statue of St Nicholas of Torentino | Triq Santu Wistin c/w Vjal Santu Wistin | 35°52′59″N 14°24′08″E | 2344 | Statue of St Nicholas of Torentino | Upload Photo |
| Niche of the Madonna of the Good Counsel | 55 Triq Santu Wistin c/w Triq Zondadari | 35°53′00″N 14°24′05″E | 2345 | Niche of the Madonna of the Good Counsel | Upload Photo |
| Niche of the Immaculate Conception | 54 Triq Santu Wistin c/w Triq Zondadari | 35°53′00″N 14°24′04″E | 2346 | Niche of the Immaculate Conception | Upload Photo |
| Church of St Bartholomew | Triq Zondadari c/w Triq San Bartilmew | 35°53′01″N 14°24′05″E | 2347 | Church of St Bartholomew | Upload Photo |
| Niche of Ecce Homo | 22 Triq Zondadari | 35°53′01″N 14°24′05″E | 2348 | Niche of Ecce Homo | Upload Photo |
| Niche of St Joseph | Triq San Bartilmew | 35°53′01″N 14°24′04″E | 2349 | Niche of St Joseph | Upload Photo |
| Church of St Mary (Ta' Doni) | Triq San Pawl c/w Triq Doni | 35°53′03″N 14°24′01″E | 2350 | Church of St Mary (Ta' Doni) | Upload Photo |
| Niche of St Joseph | Triq San Ġużepp | 35°53′00″N 14°24′01″E | 2351 | Niche of St Joseph | Upload Photo |
| Niche of the Nativity of Christ | Triq Santu Wistin c/w Triq il-Repubblika | 35°53′00″N 14°24′03″E | 2352 | Niche of the Nativity of Christ | Upload Photo |
| Stone Cross | Triq Għajn Qajjet | 35°53′29″N 14°22′52″E | 2353 | Stone Cross | Upload Photo |
| Niche of the Assumption | Triq Doni c/w Triq San Pawl | 35°49′59″N 14°27′26″E | 2354 | Niche of the Assumption | Upload Photo |
| Relief of the Assumption | 73 Triq San Pawl | 35°53′03″N 14°24′01″E | 2355 | Relief of the Assumption | Upload Photo |
| Niche of Christ the Saviour | Triq San Pawl c/w Triq San Ġużepp | 35°53′00″N 14°24′00″E | 2356 | Niche of Christ the Saviour | Upload Photo |
| Church of the Nativity of the Madonna of Jesus (Ta' Ġieżu) | Triq San Pawl c/w Triq San Ġużepp | 35°53′00″N 14°24′00″E | 2357 | Church of the Nativity of the Madonna of Jesus (Ta' Ġieżu) | Upload Photo |
| Niche of St Joseph | 59 Triq San Pawl | 35°53′00″N 14°23′59″E | 2358 | Niche of St Joseph | Upload Photo |
| Niche of St Francis | 11/12 Triq San Pawl | 35°52′59″N 14°23′59″E | 2359 | Niche of St Francis | Upload Photo |
| Niche of the Immaculate Conception | 13/14 Triq San Pawl | 35°52′59″N 14°23′58″E | 2360 | Niche of the Immaculate Conception | Upload Photo |
| Niche of St Joseph | 15/16 Triq San Pawl | 35°52′58″N 14°23′58″E | 2361 | Niche of St Joseph | Upload Photo |
| Niche of St Anthony of Padua | 17/18 Triq San Pawl | 35°52′58″N 14°23′58″E | 2362 | Niche of St Anthony of Padua | Upload Photo |
| Niche of St Paul | 44 Triq San Pawl | 35°52′58″N 14°23′58″E | 2363 | Niche of St Paul | Upload Photo |
| Niche of the Madonna of Mount Carmel | Triq San Pawl c/w Triq il-Kbira | 35°52′57″N 14°23′58″E | 2364 | Niche of the Madonna of Mount Carmel | Upload Photo |
| Statue of St Paul | Triq San Pawl c/w Triq il-Kbira | 35°52′56″N 14°23′58″E | 2365 | Statue of St Paul | Upload Photo |
| Parish Church of St Paul | Misraħ il-Parroċċa | 35°52′54″N 14°23′57″E | 2366 | Parish Church of St Paul | Upload Photo |
| Niche of the Sacred Heart of Jesus | Triq Kilin (Mikiel Spiteri) | 35°53′02″N 14°23′50″E | 2367 | Niche of the Sacred Heart of Jesus | Upload Photo |
| Niche of St Paul | Triq Kilin (Mikiel Spiteri) | 35°53′04″N 14°23′49″E | 2368 | Niche of St Paul | Upload Photo |
| Niche of the Ecce Homo | 2 Triq Ġilormu Dingli | 35°53′04″N 14°23′53″E | 2369 | Niche of the Ecce Homo | Upload Photo |
| Statue of St Paul | Triq Doni l-Qadima c/w Triq Doni | 35°53′04″N 14°23′55″E | 2370 | Statue of St Paul | Upload Photo |
| Niche of the Madonna of Lourdes | Triq Doni l-Qadima | 35°53′02″N 14°23′52″E | 2371 | Niche of the Madonna of Lourdes | Upload Photo |
| Niche of St Joseph | Triq Indri Borġ | 35°53′02″N 14°23′56″E | 2372 | Niche of St Joseph | Upload Photo |
| Niche of St Paul | Triq San Martin c/w Triq Indri Borġ | 35°53′02″N 14°23′57″E | 2373 | Niche of St Paul | Upload Photo |
| Niche of the Madonna of the Good Counsel | Triq San Martin c/w Triq Indri Borġ | 35°53′02″N 14°23′57″E | 2374 | Niche of the Madonna of the Good Counsel | Upload Photo |
| Niche of St Joseph | Sqaq San Martin Nru. 1 | 35°53′01″N 14°23′57″E | 2375 | | Upload Photo |
| Niche of St Joseph | Triq Indri Borġ | 35°53′02″N 14°23′58″E | 2376 | Niche of St Joseph | Upload Photo |
| Niche of the Immaculate Conception | Triq Indri Borġ | 35°53′02″N 14°23′59″E | 2377 | Niche of the Immaculate Conception | Upload Photo |
| Niche of St Agatha | "Karġuż", 12 Triq Misraħ Suffara c/w Triq Mons. G. Depiro | 35°52′43″N 14°23′43″E | 2378 | Niche of St Agatha | Upload Photo |
| Niche of the Madonna of Mount Carmel | 66 Triq Ħal Bajjada c/w Triq Karmena Micallef | 35°52′45″N 14°23′46″E | 2379 | Niche of the Madonna of Mount Carmel | Upload Photo |
| Niche of St Agatha | Triq Ħal Bajjada c/w 2 Triq Rudolph Saliba | 35°52′46″N 14°23′47″E | 2380 | Niche of St Agatha | Upload Photo |
| Niche of St Paul | 43 Triq Ħal Bajjada | 35°52′47″N 14°23′48″E | 2381 | Niche of St Paul | Upload Photo |
| Niche of the Holy Family | 23 Triq Ħal Bajjada | 35°52′48″N 14°23′50″E | 2382 | Niche of the Holy Family | Upload Photo |
| Niche of St Agatha | 17/19 Triq Ħal Bajjada | 35°52′48″N 14°23′50″E | 2383 | Niche of St Agatha | Upload Photo |
| Niche of St Paul | 7/9 Triq Ħal Bajjada | 35°52′49″N 14°23′51″E | 2384 | Niche of St Paul | Upload Photo |
| Cross | Sqaq Sant'Agata | 35°52′50″N 14°23′51″E | 2385 | Cross | Upload Photo |
| Niche of St Paul | 18 Triq Sant'Agata | 35°52′53″N 14°23′52″E | 2386 | Niche of St Paul | Upload Photo |
| Niche of the Madonna and Jesus | 6 Triq Sant'Agata | 35°52′53″N 14°23′53″E | 2387 | Niche of the Madonna and Jesus | Upload Photo |
| Niche of St Paul | 3 Triq Sant'Agata | 35°52′54″N 14°23′54″E | 2388 | Niche of St Paul | Upload Photo |
| Niche of the Crucifix | 2 il-Katakombi | 35°52′53″N 14°23′54″E | 2389 | Niche of the Crucifix | Upload Photo |
| Niche of St Paul | 6 il-Katakombi | 35°52′52″N 14°23′53″E | 2390 | Niche of St Paul | Upload Photo |
| Niche of the Madonna of Lourdes | 46 il-Katakombi | 35°52′51″N 14°23′53″E | 2391 | Niche of the Madonna of Lourdes | Upload Photo |
| Statue of St Catald | Triq San Kataldu | 35°52′54″N 14°23′54″E | 2392 | Statue of St Catald | Upload Photo |
| Church of St Catald | Triq San Kataldu | 35°52′54″N 14°23′53″E | 2393 | Church of St Catald | Upload Photo |
| Niche of St Paul | 10 Triq San Kataldu | 35°52′54″N 14°23′54″E | 2394 | Niche of St Paul | Upload Photo |
| Statue of St Paul | Pjazza tal-Parroċċa | 35°52′54″N 14°23′56″E | 2395 | Statue of St Paul | Upload Photo |
| Statue of St Peter | Pjazza tal-Parroċċa | 35°52′55″N 14°23′57″E | 2396 | Statue of St Peter | Upload Photo |
| Niche of the Immaculate Conception | 30 Triq Bir ir-Riebu | 35°52′57″N 14°23′50″E | 2397 | Niche of the Immaculate Conception | Upload Photo |
| Niche of the Sacred Heart of Jesus | 64 Triq Bir ir-Riebu c/w Triq Emmanuele Vitale | 35°52′57″N 14°23′47″E | 2398 | Niche of the Sacred Heart of Jesus | Upload Photo |
| Chapel of the Nativity of Our Lady and St Nicholas | Triq Bir ir-Riebu c/w Daħlet id-Dejr | 35°52′58″N 14°23′36″E | 2399 | Chapel of the Nativity of Our Lady and St Nicholas | Upload Photo |
| Niche of St Joseph | 1 Vjal il-Ħaddiem c/w Triq in-Nigret | 35°52′55″N 14°23′32″E | 2400 | | Upload Photo |
| Niche of the Madonna of the Good Counsel | 18 Triq il-Kbira | 35°52′56″N 14°24′04″E | 2401 | Niche of the Madonna of the Good Counsel | Upload Photo |
| Niche of the Crucifix | Triq ir-Repubblika c/w Triq il-Kbira | 35°52′57″N 14°24′02″E | 2402 | Niche of the Crucifix | Upload Photo |
| Niche of St Paul | Triq Cosmana Navarra | 35°52′55″N 14°24′03″E | 2403 | Niche of St Paul | Upload Photo |
| Church of St Francis | Triq San Franġisk | 35°52′54″N 14°24′05″E | 2404 | Church of St Francis | Upload Photo |
| Statue of St Anthony of Padua | opposite 21 Triq San Franġisk | 35°52′54″N 14°24′04″E | 2405 | Statue of St Anthony of Padua | Upload Photo |
| Niche of the Madonna of Good Counsel | 21 Triq San Franġisk | 35°52′54″N 14°24′04″E | 2406 | Niche of the Madonna of Good Counsel | Upload Photo |
| Statue of the Immaculate Conception | "Dar is-Sebħ", 17 Triq San Franġisk c/w Sqaq San Franġisk Nru. 1 | 35°52′53″N 14°24′04″E | 2407 | Statue of the Immaculate Conception | Upload Photo |
| Statue of St Francis of Assisi | opposite Sqaq San Franġisk Nru. 1 | 35°52′53″N 14°24′04″E | 2408 | Statue of St Francis of Assisi | Upload Photo |
| Niche of St Joseph | Sqaq San Franġisk Nru. 1 | 35°52′53″N 14°24′03″E | 2409 | Niche of St Joseph | Upload Photo |
| Niche of St Joseph | 36 Triq San Franġisk c/w "La Rosa", 2 Triq Ġorġ Borġ Olivier | 35°52′52″N 14°24′04″E | 2410 | Niche of St Joseph | Upload Photo |
| Niche of St Francis of Assisi | 36 Triq San Franġisk c/w "La Rosa", 2 Triq Ġorġ Borġ Olivier | 35°52′52″N 14°24′04″E | 2411 | Niche of St Francis of Assisi | Upload Photo |
| Niche of St Vincent Ferreri | "La Rosa", 2 Triq Ġorġ Borġ Olivier c/w 24 Triq Nikola Saura | 35°52′52″N 14°24′04″E | 2412 | Niche of St Vincent Ferreri | Upload Photo |
| Niche of St Bonaventura | "La Rosa", 2 Triq Ġorġ Borġ Olivier c/w 24 Triq Nikola Saura | 35°52′52″N 14°24′04″E | 2413 | Niche of St Bonaventura | Upload Photo |
| Niche of St Paul | 27 Triq il-Konti Ruġġieru | 35°52′51″N 14°24′01″E | 2414 | Niche of St Paul | Upload Photo |
| Niche of the Madonna of Mount Carmel | 25 Triq il-Konti Ruġġieru | 35°52′51″N 14°24′01″E | 2415 | Niche of the Madonna of Mount Carmel | Upload Photo |
| Niche of St Anthony of Padua | Triq Sant'Antnin c/w Triq Santa Marija | 35°52′52″N 14°24′00″E | 2416 | Niche of St Anthony of Padua | Upload Photo |
| Niche of the Immaculate Conception | 31 Triq San Publju c/w Triq Santa Marija | 35°52′50″N 14°24′00″E | 2417 | Niche of the Immaculate Conception | Upload Photo |
| Niche of St Paul | 89 Triq il-Kulleġġ c/w Triq Santa Marija | 35°52′47″N 14°23′58″E | 2418 | Niche of St Paul | Upload Photo |
| Niche of St Paul | Sqaq il-Kulleġġ Nru. 2 | 35°52′49″N 14°23′56″E | 2419 | Niche of St Paul | Upload Photo |
| Niche of the Madonna of Sorrows | 43/45 Triq il-Kulleġġ | 35°52′50″N 14°23′57″E | 2420 | Niche of the Madonna of Sorrows | Upload Photo |
| Niche of the Madonna with Jesus | 98 Triq il-Kulleġġ | 35°52′45″N 14°23′59″E | 2421 | Niche of the Madonna with Jesus | Upload Photo |
| Church of St Sebastian | Triq Ġorġ Borg Olivier (opp. Triq il-Kulleġġ) | 35°52′42″N 14°24′03″E | 2422 | Church of St Sebastian | Upload Photo |
| Niche of the Madonna of Mount Carmel | Triq il-Kulleġġ c/w Triq Ġorġ Borġ Olivier | 35°52′42″N 14°24′02″E | 2423 | Niche of the Madonna of Mount Carmel | Upload Photo |
| Niche of Christ the Saviour | 103 Triq Ġorġ Borġ Olivier c/w Triq Tal-Virtù | 35°52′41″N 14°24′01″E | 2424 | Niche of Christ the Saviour | Upload Photo |
| Niche of the Madonna of Mount Carmel | 110 Triq Ġorġ Borġ Olivier c/w Triq il-Kulleġġ | 35°52′42″N 14°24′01″E | 2425 | Niche of the Madonna of Mount Carmel | Upload Photo |
| Niche of the Madonna of Sorrows | 5 Triq San Bastjan | 35°52′43″N 14°24′03″E | 2426 | Niche of the Madonna of Sorrows | Upload Photo |
| Niche of St Joseph | 10 Triq San Bastjan | 35°52′43″N 14°24′03″E | 2427 | Niche of St Joseph | Upload Photo |
| Niche of the Madonna of Mount Carmel | 9 Triq Kola Xara | 35°52′45″N 14°23′58″E | 2428 | Niche of the Madonna of Mount Carmel | Upload Photo |
| Chapel of St Anthony the Abbot | il-Palazz ta' Verdala | 35°51′43″N 14°24′02″E | 2429 | | Upload Photo |
| Chapel of the Sisters of Charity | 23 Triq Santu Rokku | 35°52′41″N 14°24′04″E | 2430 | Chapel of the Sisters of Charity | Upload Photo |
| Chapel of Our Lady of Virtu' | Triq Tal-Virtu | 35°52′25″N 14°24′24″E | 2431 | Chapel of Our Lady of Virtu' | Upload Photo |
| Chapel of the Ursuline Sisters | 70 Triq Tal-Virtu c/w Triq San Vinċenz Ferreri | 35°52′35″N 14°24′05″E | 2432 | Chapel of the Ursuline Sisters | Upload Photo |
| Church of the Annunciation | Triq tal-Lunzjata | 35°52′35″N 14°23′04″E | 2433 | | Upload Photo |
| Niche of the Immaculate Conception | Triq Santa Katerina | 35°52′33″N 14°23′30″E | 2434 | | Upload Photo |
| Niche of St Paul | | | 2435 | | Upload Photo |
| Church of the Madonna of the Grotto | Misraħ San Duminku | 35°52′34″N 14°23′59″E | 2436 | | Upload Photo |
| Niche of St Joseph | Misraħ San Duminku c/w Triq Ħal-Tartarni | 35°52′34″N 14°23′55″E | 2437 | Niche of St Joseph | Upload Photo |
| Statue of the Madonna of the Rosary | Misraħ San Duminku | 35°52′33″N 14°23′57″E | 2438 | Statue of the Madonna of the Rosary | Upload Photo |
| Niche of St Vincent Ferreri | 26 Misraħ San Duminku c/w 170 Triq Ġorġ Borġ Olivier | 35°52′37″N 14°23′57″E | 2439 | Niche of St Vincent Ferreri | Upload Photo |
| Church of the Nativity of the Virgin Mary (ta' Qasha) | Triq Santa Rita c/w Triq Pierre Muscat | 35°53′02″N 14°23′44″E | 2440 | Church of the Nativity of the Virgin Mary (ta' Qasha) | Upload Photo |
| Niche of St Paul | Triq in-Nigret | 35°52′53″N 14°23′21″E | 2441 | | Upload Photo |
| Niche of St Joseph | 17 Triq Bir ir-Riebu | 35°52′56″N 14°23′51″E | 2442 | Niche of St Joseph | Upload Photo |
| Church of St Publius | 1 Triq il-Kulleġġ | 35°52′54″N 14°23′57″E | 2443 | Church of St Publius | Upload Photo |
| Niche of St Agatha | Sqaq Bir il-Ljun Nru. 1 | 35°52′58″N 14°23′57″E | 2444 | Niche of St Agatha | Upload Photo |
| Niche of the Immaculate Conception | Triq il-Patrijiet | 35°53′00″N 14°23′58″E | 2445 | Niche of the Immaculate Conception | Upload Photo |
| Chapel of St Nicholas (Ta' Saura) | Triq Nikola Saura | 35°52′52″N 14°24′06″E | 2446 | Chapel of St Nicholas (Ta' Saura) | Upload Photo |
| Church of St Agatha | Triq Sant'Agata | 35°52′49″N 14°23′48″E | 2447 | Church of St Agatha | Upload Photo |
| Niche of St Paul | Sqaq iċ-Ċjaki | 35°52′42″N 14°23′54″E | 2448 | Niche of St Paul | Upload Photo |
| Statue of St Paul (Kuntent) | Triq San Pawl Kuntent c/w Triq Ħad-Dingli | 35°52′23″N 14°23′40″E | 2449 | Statue of St Paul (Kuntent) | Upload Photo |
| Niche of St Domenic of Guzman | 134 Triq Ġorġ Borġ Olivier c/w Sqaq Ġorġ Borġ Olivier Nru. 1 | 35°52′39″N 14°24′00″E | 2450 | Niche of St Domenic of Guzman | Upload Photo |
