= Casa Cosmana Navarra =

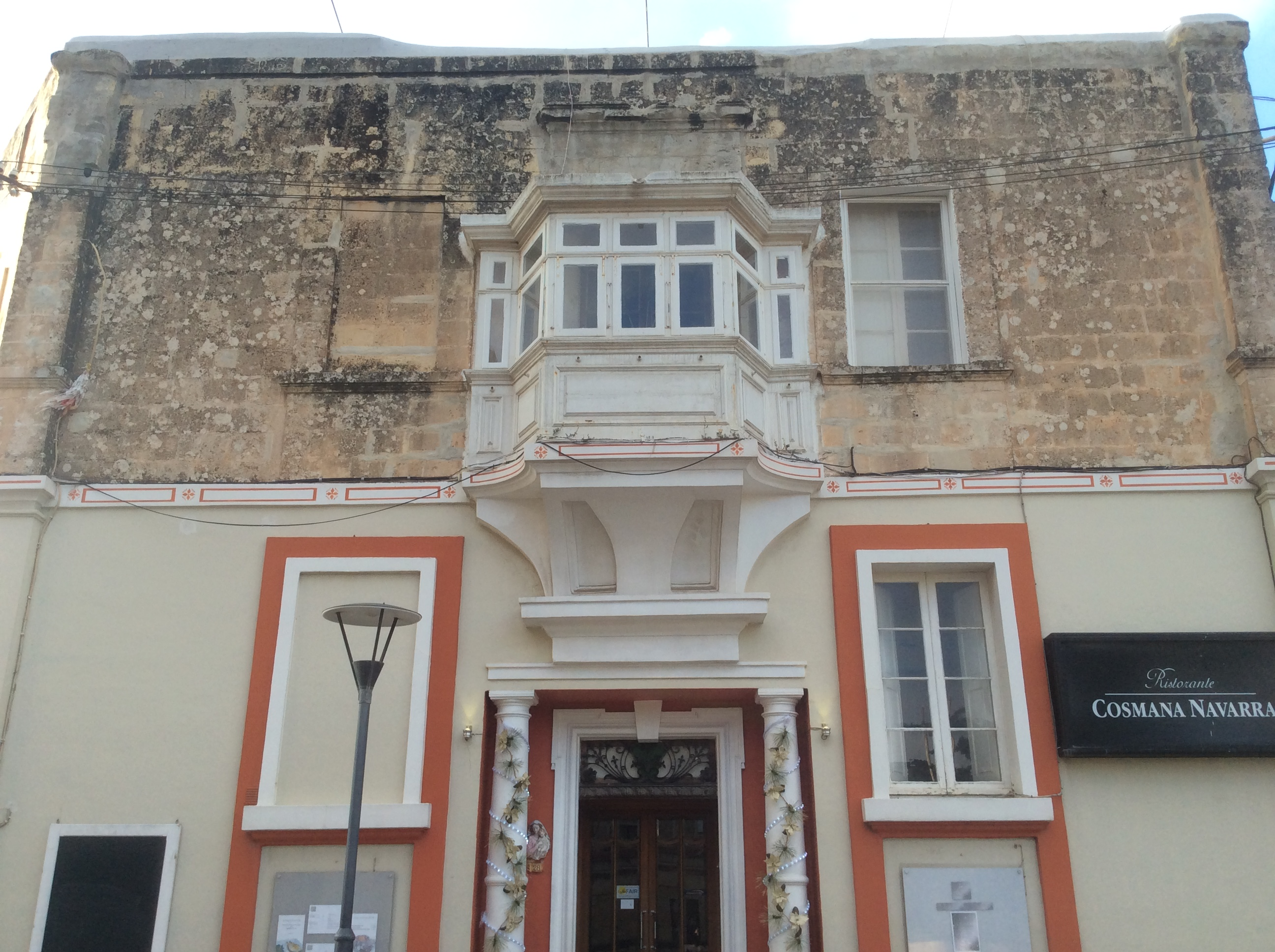
- Front façade of Casa Cosmana Navarra

- Location within Malta

General information
- Status: Intact
- Type: Townhouse
- Architectural style: Vernacular and Baroque
- Location: Rabat, Malta
- Coordinates: 35°52′55.46″N 14°23′56.02″E
- Completed: 17th century
- Renovated: 2014
- Owner: Jonathan Castellari

Technical details
- Material: Limestone
- Floor count: 2

Website
- www.cosmana.com

Casa Cosmana Navarra (English: Cosmana Navarra House) is a 17th-century aristocratic townhouse in Rabat, Malta. The building belonged to Cosmana Navarra (1600-1687), for whom it is named until date, who was the main benefactress of the rebuilding of the Rabat parish church of St. Paul. The house is found in front of the parish church opposite the Wignacourt Museum. Most of the building was converted into a restaurant.

== Location ==
Casa Cosmana Navarra is found at 28 St. Paul’s Street in Rabat, Malta, next to Rabat's parish church and close to The Wignacourt Museum.

== History ==
Casa Cosmana Navarra was one of the few residential houses built in the 17th century in Rabat, the suburb of Mdina, as building outside fortified cities was not encouraged. Cosmana Navarra (born Guzmana Cumbo; when married, Cassar; known by her mother's surname as Navarra) was the daughter of Gakbu Cumbo and Cornelia Cumbo (née Navarra), of the Cumbo-Navarra family. On 22 June 1625, at the age of 25, she married her only lifetime husband Lorenzo Cassar in the (previous) Cathedral of Imdina. The marriage was childless, in which case gave Cosmana Navarra more time to dedicate for the building of her house and the restructuring of the parish church in Rabat, Malta.

Cosmana Navarra was a devotee of St. Paul and this is shown by her interest and actions involved with the St. Paul pilgrimage site in Rabat of St. Paul’s Cave (Grotto), at the now Wignacourt Museum. She was a main philanthropist for the re-construction of the parish church that was aimed to receive several pilgrims from Europe; that can be considered a historic development in tourism in Malta. She made sure that Casa Cosmana Navarra and the Wignacourt Museum are both featured as the main building at opposite sides of each other in front the church, of which both are corner buildings. Through her father her surname was Cumbo and with marriage she became officially Cassar but she was always referred to by her mother's surname as Navarra.

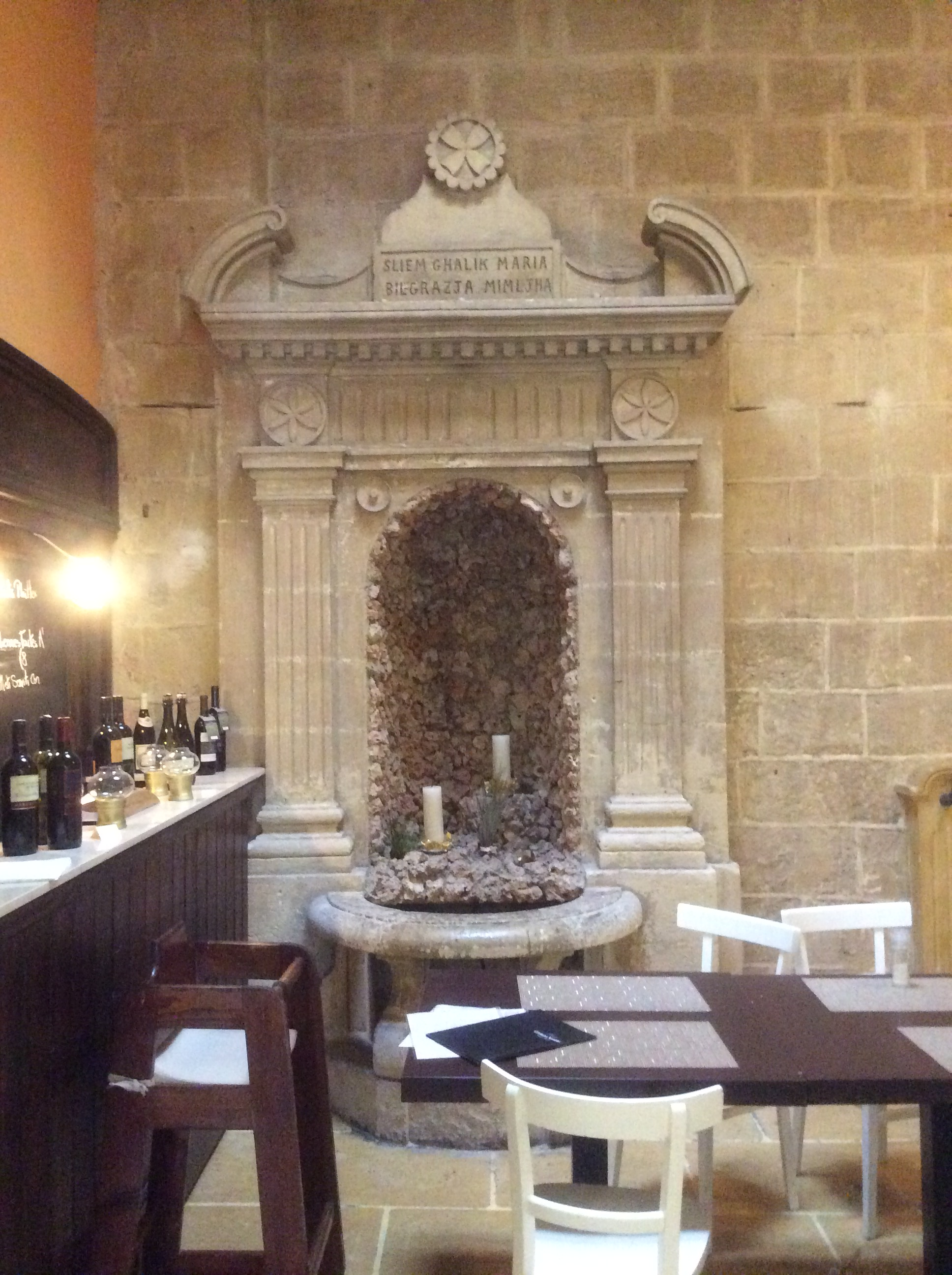
Niche in the former garden of Casa Cosmana Navarra, now a closed area

Cosmana was the mastermind after the various parts of the rebuilding of St. Paul Parish Church that stands just outside her cornered townhouse, Casa Cosmana Navarra. The new design on the church was given to Lorenzo Gafa according to Cosmana's choice. Works on the parish church started in 1653 but stopped shortly in 1662, to then continue in 1664. A document dated to 19 April 1664 says that Cosmana paid 1700 scudi for the continuation of the project which had stopped in 1662. In 1666 the San Anton Chapel was finalized and received the blessing of the local Bishop Lucas Buenos; this is known by a letter sent to her by the bishop, dated on 10 July 1666.

Eventually Cosmana had paid for the titular painting of the church in 1678, followed by the church patio (or courtyard) a year later in 1679. Cosmana had written to Grandmaster Nicolas Cotoner in order to sell her a nearby land next to the parish church, of which acquisition could extend and ameliorate the church and surrounding, but at her disappointment this was initially denied. Historically there was always a conflict between the Order of St. John and Roman Catholic priests in Malta in which case this also included issues related to St. Paul's Cave (Grotto). In 1680 Grand Master Gregorio Carafa conceded to give the property next to the church to Cosmana, allowing her to build the Chapel of St. Stephen as part of the parish church's side chapels, on condition of having his portrait at the church. Sometimes later she even added the Chapel of St. Publius to the parish church. In 1683 Cosmana paid for the construction of an underground for St. Paul's Grotto, and for the new baroque facade of the parish church seen just outside her house.

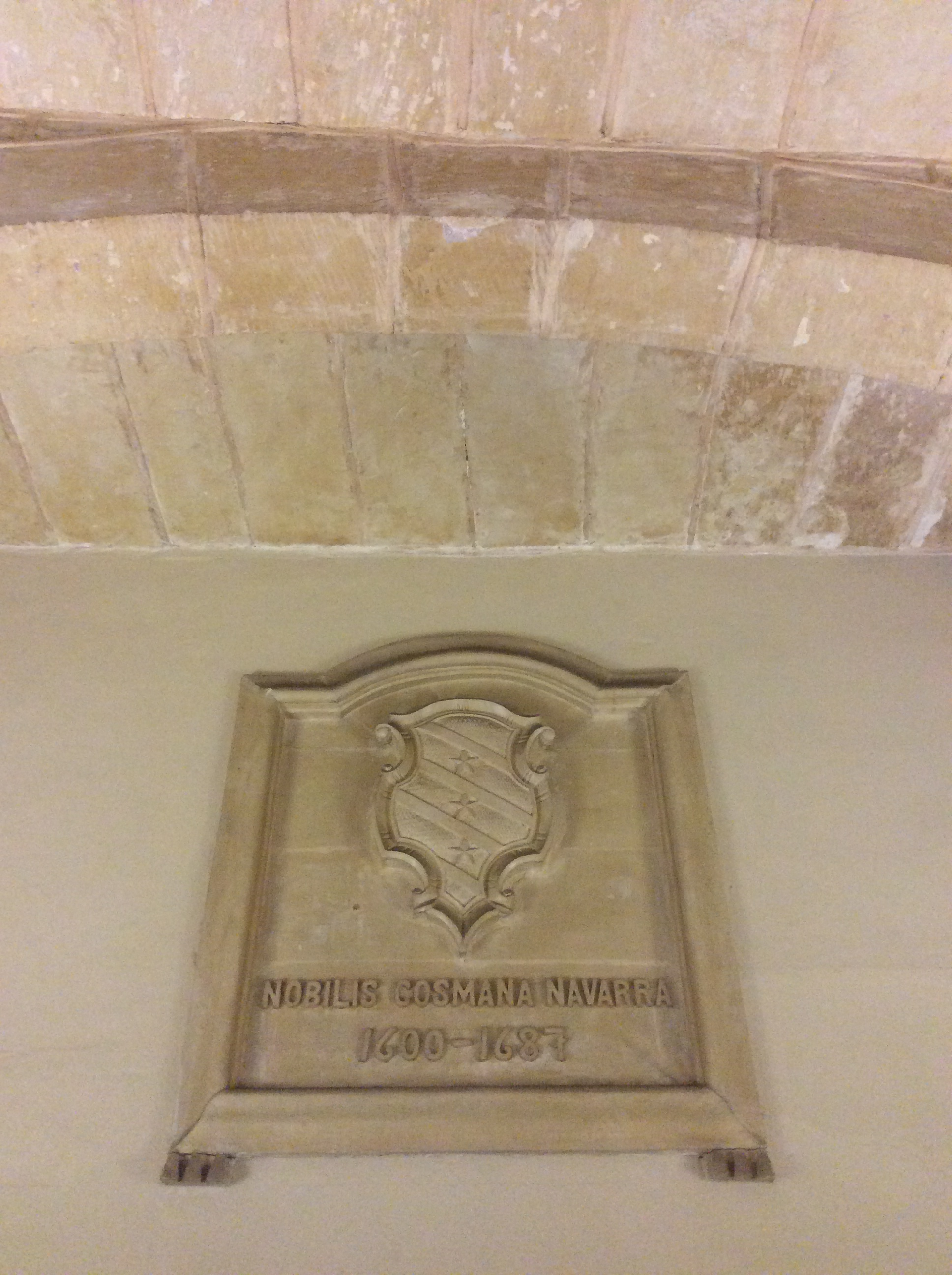
Commemorative coat-of-arms of Cosmana Navarra, showing the years of her lifetime, at Casa Cosmana Navarra

Cosmana died on 30 January 1687 when she was 87 years and was interned at the San Anton Chapel, that is found inside the St. Paul Parish Church. Her ambitious plan for the reconstruction of the parish church was finished before her death. In remembrance of her as the founder and philanthropist of the parish church there are at least two art works depicting her inside the church; one features her next to Casa Cosmana Navarra and the parish church. Significantly these paintings feature: the side patio (Zuntier) of the parish church and the designs (plans) of the church in her hands. These images were intentionally painted to convey a message of her being the projects' main philanthropist; it significantly lead to her house, Casa Cosmana Navarra, to be featured first inside the church as a painting, and secondly (after demolishing several other houses to build the church’s patio) physically let her house featuring in an outstanding position next to the church.

In 1735, artist Gio Nicola Buhagiar, was commissioned to paint her of which painting is found in the sacristy of San Anton Chapel where she rests. The family's coat-of-arms features on several objects and places such as on Cosmana's tombstone and painting at the Parish Church, on silver artifacts which she left as dowry to the Roman Cathoclic Church in Malta and on the inside of Casa Cosmana Navarra's main entrance door. Costmana wrote her doury in 1675 with local notary Nicola Allegretto.

== Architecture ==
Casa Cosmana Navarra is considered as a traditional Maltese townhouse. It has a vernacular and modern facade, that includes a closed timber balcony and two neoclassic columns uncommon to the time. In the inside it features some baroque architecture including the coat-of-arms of the family, the decorative archways from a room to the other upstairs, and features in the former courtyard (now a room as well). It has several spacious rooms inside. Most of the building is a restaurant and open to the public.

== Ristorante Cosmana Navarra ==
Since the 20th-century Casa Cosmana Navarra has been a restaurant specializing in pizza and pasta. It was initially run by Maltese people but more recently is run by an Italian family. The restaurant is found on Trip Advisor. The restaurant is run by Chef Jonathan Castellari since 2014. The restaurant offers a "park and ride" service to reach the place for customers who use cars in order to address parking issues. This initiative was supported by the Government of Malta and is considered a positive initiative by Minister of Transport Evarist Bartolo.
