= Chapel of San Mikiel Is-Sanċir =

Chapel of St Michael
- The Medieval Chapel of St Micahel Is-Sanċir
- Kappella Medjevali ta' San Mikiel is-Sanċir
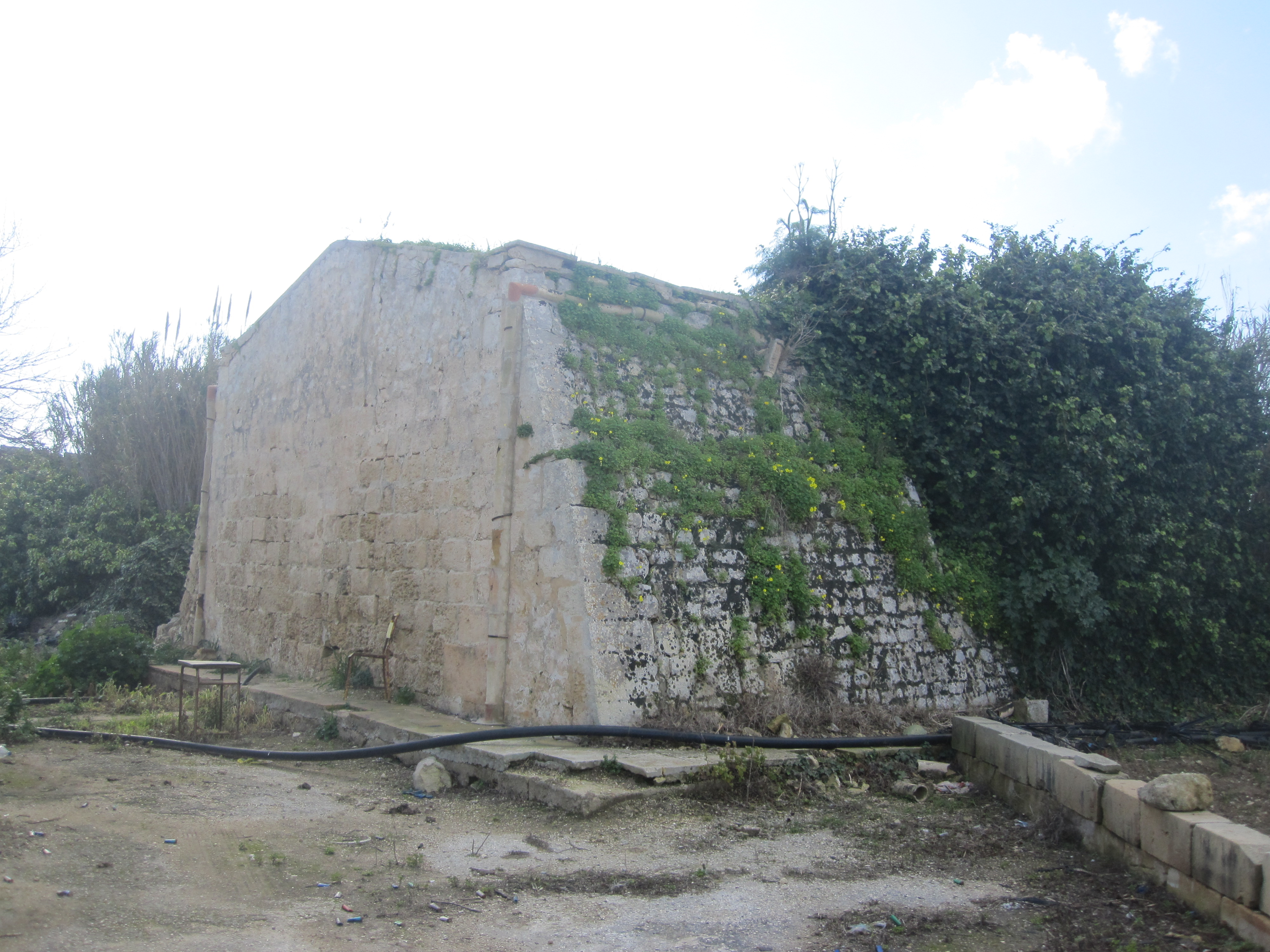
- The back and side of the chapel in 2017, the front being covered with overgrown trees and Ivy.

- Location within Malta
- 35°53′16.0″N 14°23′15.1″E
- Location: Rabat
- Country: Malta
- Denomination: Roman Catholic

History
- Status: Disused
- Dedication: Michael the Archangel

Architecture
- Functional status: Church
- Completed: 15th century

Administration
- Archdiocese: Malta

The Chapel of St Michael more popularly known in Maltese as Il-Kappella tas-San Ċir or Il-Kappella ta' San Mikiel is-Sanċir is a medieval chapel located in the limits of Rabat, Malta in an area referred to as Ġnien is-Sultan (King's Garden).

== Origins ==
The chapel's architecture dates back to the middle of the 15th century. The first mention of the chapel is found in a report written by Bishop Pietro Dusino when he visited Malta in 1575. The report refers to the church as the church of St Michael in the garden of Ġnien is-Sultan. The chapel was mentioned numerous times through the years, notably in 1615 when Bishop Baldassare Cagliares described the painting of St Michael located in the church as barely recognizable, indicating the poor state of the chapel. In 1598 Bishop Gargallo mentions that the feast of St Michael was celebrated every September 29 with vespers, which were attended by the local farmers. Due to its neglected state, in 1678 Bishop Miguel Jerónimo de Molina deconsecrated the church and ordered that the painting of St Michael be transferred to the parish church of Rabat.

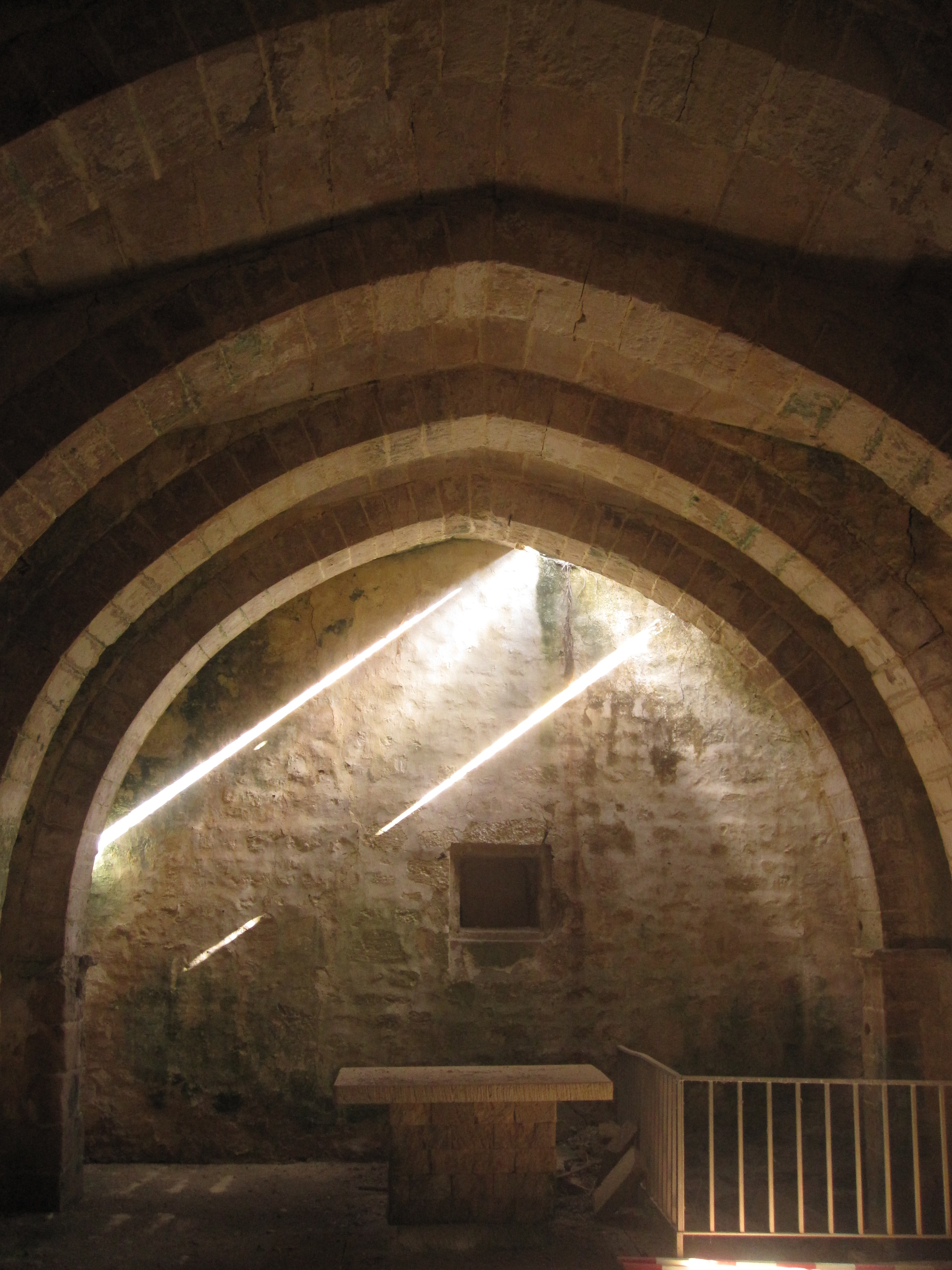
Interior of the chapel

== Use as a stable ==
After the chapel fell in disrepair it was used as a stable and storage space by local farmers. A wall was built inside the chapel to divide it in two sections.

== Restoration ==
In 1981 the chapel was restored and the wall that divided the chapel was demolished. The chapel was restored by volunteers from the Sanċir Trust and volunteers from the National Students Travel Foundation and the Friends of Malta. A stone altar was built and the church was reopened for religious services on October 2, 1988. The President of Malta, Ugo Mifsud Bonnici attended the opening service. The service was led by Monsignor Gwann Azzopardi who was a benefactor of the chapel's restoration.

== Present day ==
In the 30 years since the church was restored, it has fallen into disuse and disrepair and is in danger of collapsing. Vegetation has grown on the walls of the chapel and trees have blocked the main entrance of the chapel. Part of the roof near the altar has collapsed, and cracks in the chapel's walls are visible.

== Interior ==
The interior of the chapel is quite bare. The interior is one spacious room with the walls built in the form of pointed arches, typical to medieval architecture in Malta. There is one stone altar. During the restoration of the 1980s, stone benches were discovered along the wall of the chapel. The chapel can be accessed by two doors. A Graffiti of a ship, which was discovered on the walls of the chapel, is probably some kind of Ex-voto.

== Name of the chapel ==
The chapel's origins may date to the Byzantine era, as evidenced by the chapel's name, Is-Sanċir. According to Professor Stanley Fiorini, the name is-Sanċir may indicate that the chapel was dedicated to Cyriacus the Anchorite, a Greek saint. After the Moors were driven out of Malta, Christianity regained its power over Malta. Western Latin Christianity was spreading, replacing any traces of the Greek Christianity in Malta, which dated from Byzantine times. As a result, the names of churches in Malta which had been dedicated to Greek saints were replaced by the names of popular Western saints. Thus, the name of this chapel might have been changed from St Cyriacus (San Ċirijaku or San Ċir in Maltese) to St Michael (San Mikiel). It is possible that the local people referred to the chapel by its original name, hence the name San Mikiel Is-Sanċir or literal translation in English, St Michael the St Cyr. However, no documentation survives to prove this theory.
