= Santo Spirito Hospital =

- L-Isptar ta' Santu Spirtu
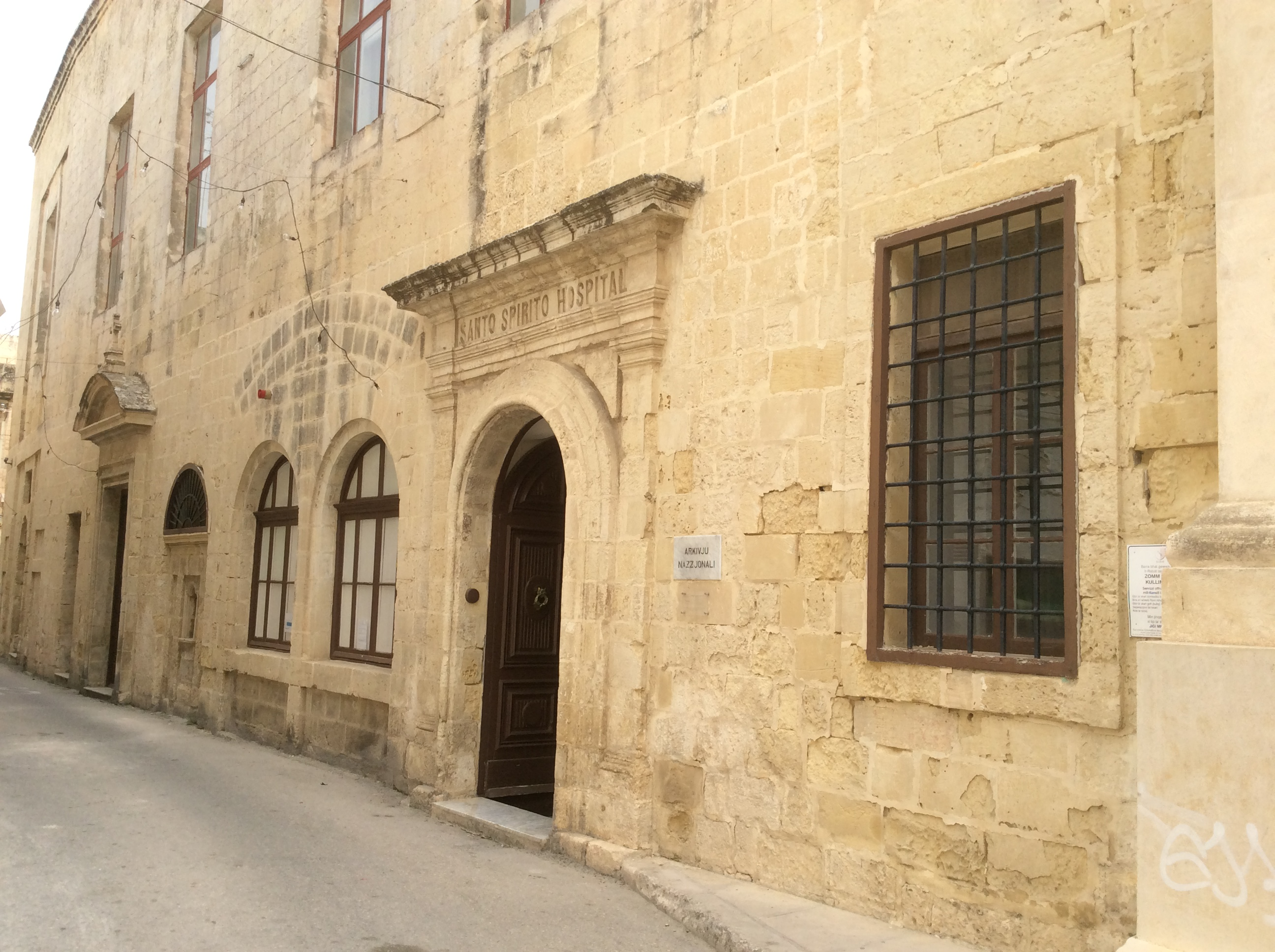
- Façade in 2017
- Interactive map of the Santo Spirito Hospital area
- Former names: St. Francis Hospital

General information
- Status: Intact
- Type: Hospital
- Location: Rabat, Malta
- Coordinates: 35°52′54.9″N 14°24′04.8″E
- Current tenants: National Archives of Malta
- Named for: Holy Spirit (formerly Francis of Assisi)
- Construction started: c. 14th century
- Renovated: 1494–1496; 17th–18th centuries 1980s
- Owner: Government of Malta

Technical details
- Material: Limestone

The Santo Spirito Hospital (Maltese: L-Isptar ta' Santu Spirtu, English: Holy Spirit Hospital), originally known as the St. Francis Hospital, is a former hospital in Rabat, Malta which functioned from at least the 14th century to 1967. Since 1994, the hospital building has housed the head office of the National Archives of Malta.

== History ==
The Santo Spirito Hospital was established during the late medieval period as the St. Francis Hospital (Latin: hospitalis Sanctj Franciscj, Italian: Ospedale San Francesco) in the suburb of Rabat, located outside the walls of Mdina, then the principal settlement on Malta. It is the earliest known hospital in Malta, and has been claimed to be one of the oldest in Europe or even the world.

The St. Francis Hospital might have been established as early as 1299, and a register held at the Vatican Apostolic Archive suggests that it already functioned during the reign of King Frederick the Simple of Sicily in the second half of the 14th century. The earliest known undisputed record of the hospital's administration is a document dated 4 December 1372 held at the Archivio di Stato di Palermo.

The hospital was named after Saint Francis of Assisi and it was run by the Franciscans who had an adjacent monastery. Some later sources claim that it functioned as a leprosarium, but there is no contemporary proof of this. In the beginning of the 15th century, the Franciscans' administration of the hospital was being criticised, and in 1403 King Martin instructed the Università – the local authority based in Mdina – to inquire into the financial management of the hospital.

In 1433, King Alfonso ordered the Università to run and maintain the hospital, while recognising the jurisdiction of the Bishop of Malta over it. On 6 May 1467, the Università sought to affiliate the hospital with the Santo Spirito hospital in Rome, and by 1474 the St. Francis Hospital had been renamed as the hospitalis Sancti Spiritus Rabbati. A major rebuilding project was carried out between 30 July 1494 and May 1496. During the early 16th century, the building was possibly damaged during corsair raids. In May 1544, the hospital's chapel was repurposed as a dormitory, and it was still being used as such during a visit by Pietro Dusina in 1575.

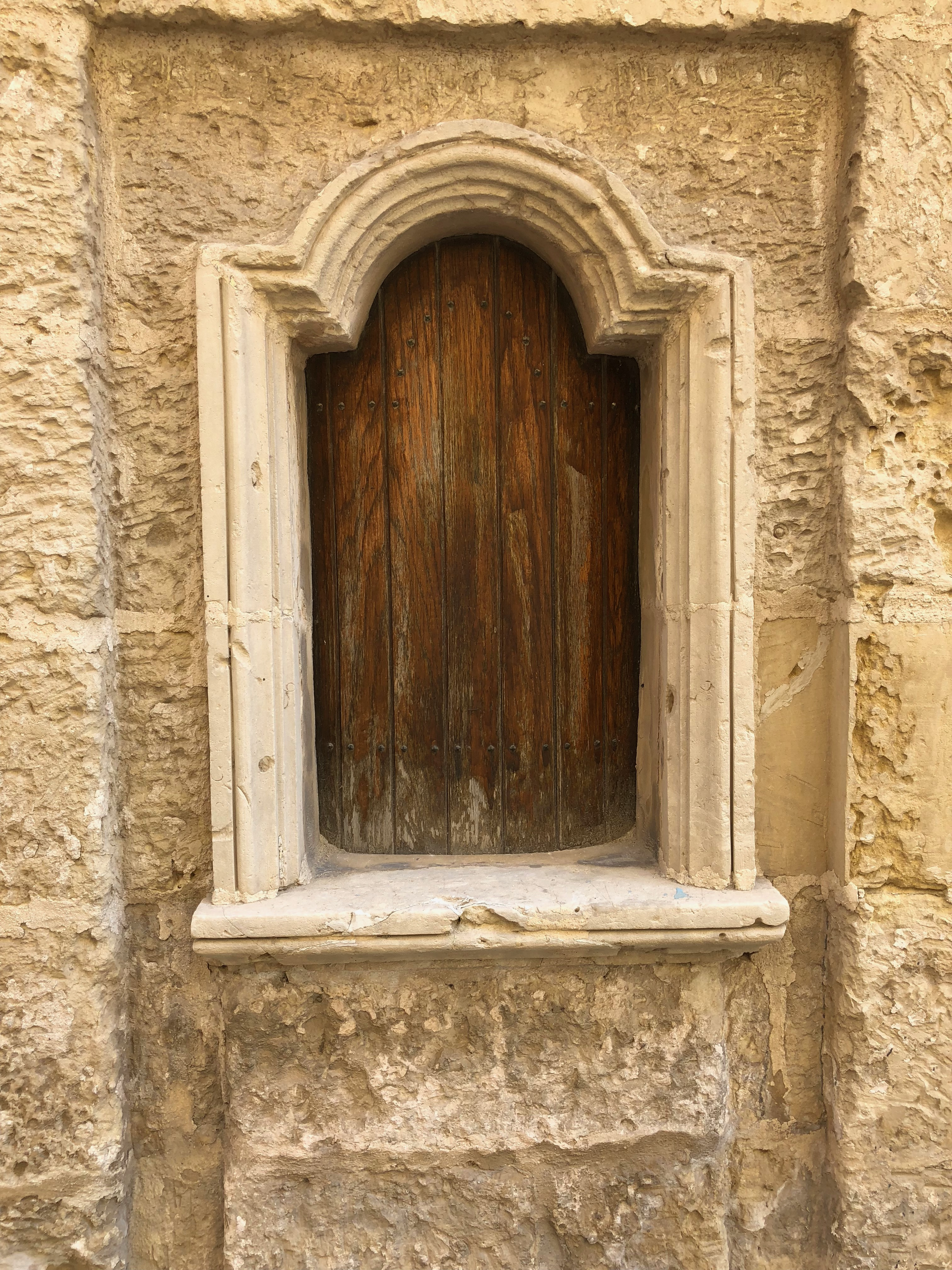
La ruota degli esposti, a baby hatch for unwanted babies along the façade of the Santo Spirito Hospital

Sick patients treated at the hospital included both local residents and foreign visitors or captives. From the mid-15th to the mid-16th centuries, the hospital also housed poor or old people who were not capable of caring for themselves. It also functioned as a foundling hospital where abandoned children were cared for, with wet nurses being employed at the hospital from 1518. A baby hatch, known as the ruota degli esposti where unwanted babies could be left to be cared for by the hospital, is still in existence along the hospital's façade. 15th and 16th century records from the hospital are preserved at the Mdina Cathedral Museum, and they are a primary source about late medieval and early modern Malta.

During the period of Hospitaller rule between the 16th and 18th centuries, the hospital was run by the Grand Masters of the Order of St. John. The building was restored during the 17th century, and in 1688 its church (also dedicated to the Holy Spirit) was reconstructed under the auspices of Grand Master Gregorio Carafa. The hospital was enlarged during the magistracy of António Manoel de Vilhena during the 18th century. Several 17th- and 18th-century Latin inscriptions are or were present in the building, including some referring to Hospitaller Grand Masters Alof de Wignacourt, Antoine de Paule, Martin de Redin, Carafa and Vilhena.

The building was being used as a convalescence hospital by 1883, and continued to function as a hospital until 1967. The building was subsequently left in a derelict state for a number of years, until efforts to repurpose it were made in the 1980s with various possible uses being considered, including conversion to a medical museum or an old people's home.

Restoration works commenced in 1986, and the following year the government allocated the building to the National Archives of Malta. Part of the archive was transferred from the Grandmaster's Palace in Valletta to the former hospital by 28 July 1989, and the building was officially opened by President Ugo Mifsud Bonnici on 28 May 1994. A pharmacy within the building was restored in 2009.

Calls to move the archives from Santo Spirito to a purpose-built building were made in the mid-2000s and 2010s. In 2019, the government made plans to construct a new archive building in Ta' Qali and repurpose the former hospital into a medical museum, but the plans fell through. As of 2024, the head office of the National Archives is still housed at Santo Spirito.
