= Cosmana Navarra =

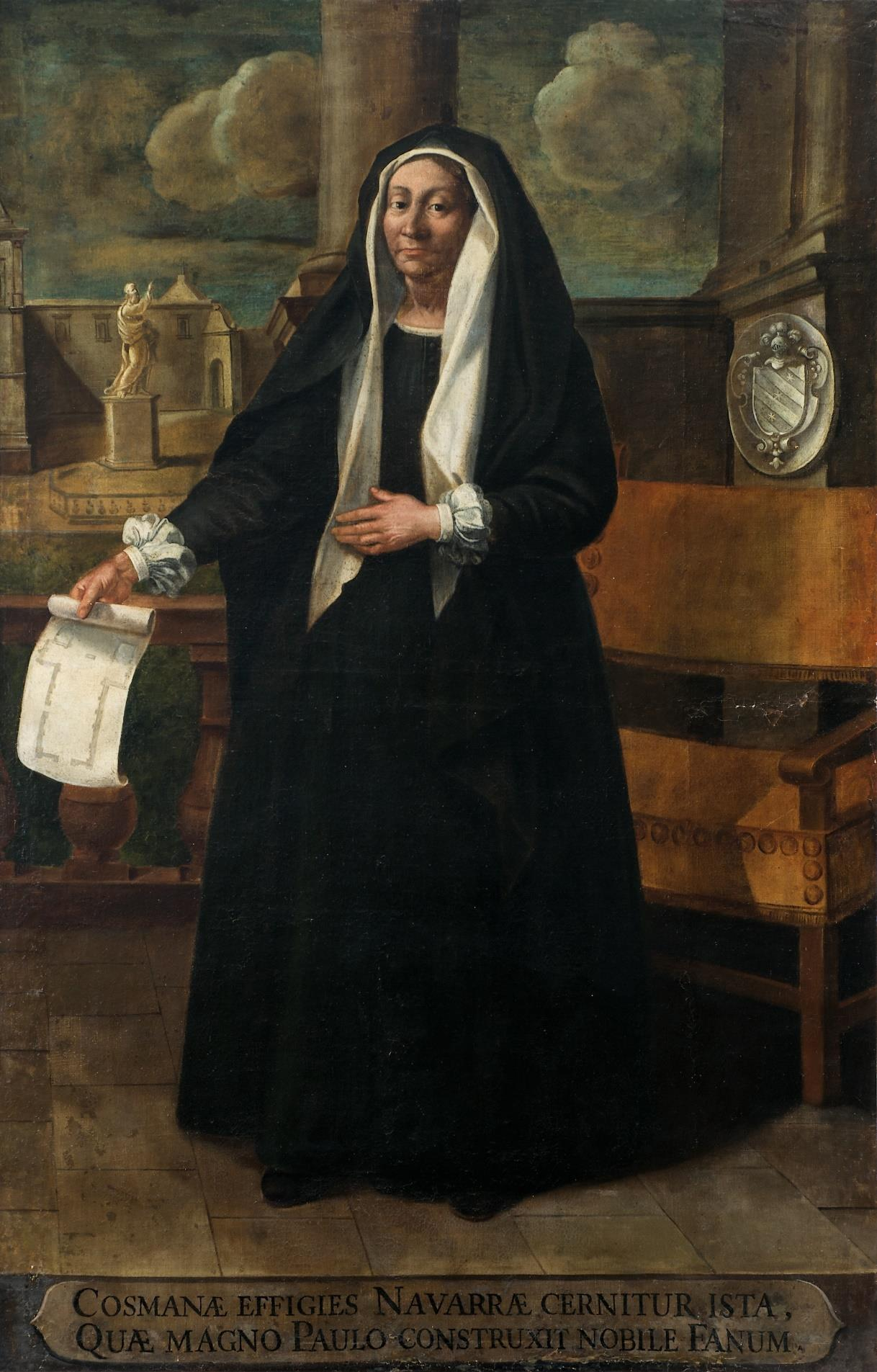
- Born: c. 1600
- Died: 30 January 1687
- Occupation: Patron of the arts

Cosmana Navarra (c. 1600 – 30 January 1687) was a Maltese noblewoman and art patron.

Cosmana Navarra was born around the year 1600, the daughter of Giovanni Cumbo and Cornelia Navarra. Her mother came from a noble family, so this may be the reason her daughter was often referred to by this surname. After her mother's death, her father married Giovanna D’Anastasio. Their daughter Timotea became Suor Geltruda Cumbo (1613-1656), popularly regarded as a saint. In 1615, Cosmana Navarra married Melchior Vella Cagliares, a lawyer and nephew of Bishop Baldassare Cagliares. They had one child, Jesuit author Ignazio Vella Cagliares (1618-1640), before he died in 1624. The next year she married Lorenzo Cassar, who died in 1660. She spent the rest of her life as a widow.

The main focus of her patronage was the Basilica of St Paul, Rabat. She spent over 30,000 scudi on the reconstruction of the church and furnishing the interior. She commissioned paintings by Mattia Preti, Melchiorre Cafà, Michelangelo Marullo, and Stefano Erardi for the church. She also constructed a palazzo, Casa Cosmana Navarra, across from the church.

Cosmana Navarra was also the owner of a slave woman called Marietta, who had a son named Mosè. The latter grew up in Navarra's household, and he became a Catholic priest.

Cosmana Navarra died in 1688 at the age of 87.
