= St Bartholomew's Chapel, Rabat =

Chapel of St Bartholomew
- The Chapel of St Bartholomew
- Kappella ta' San Bartilmew
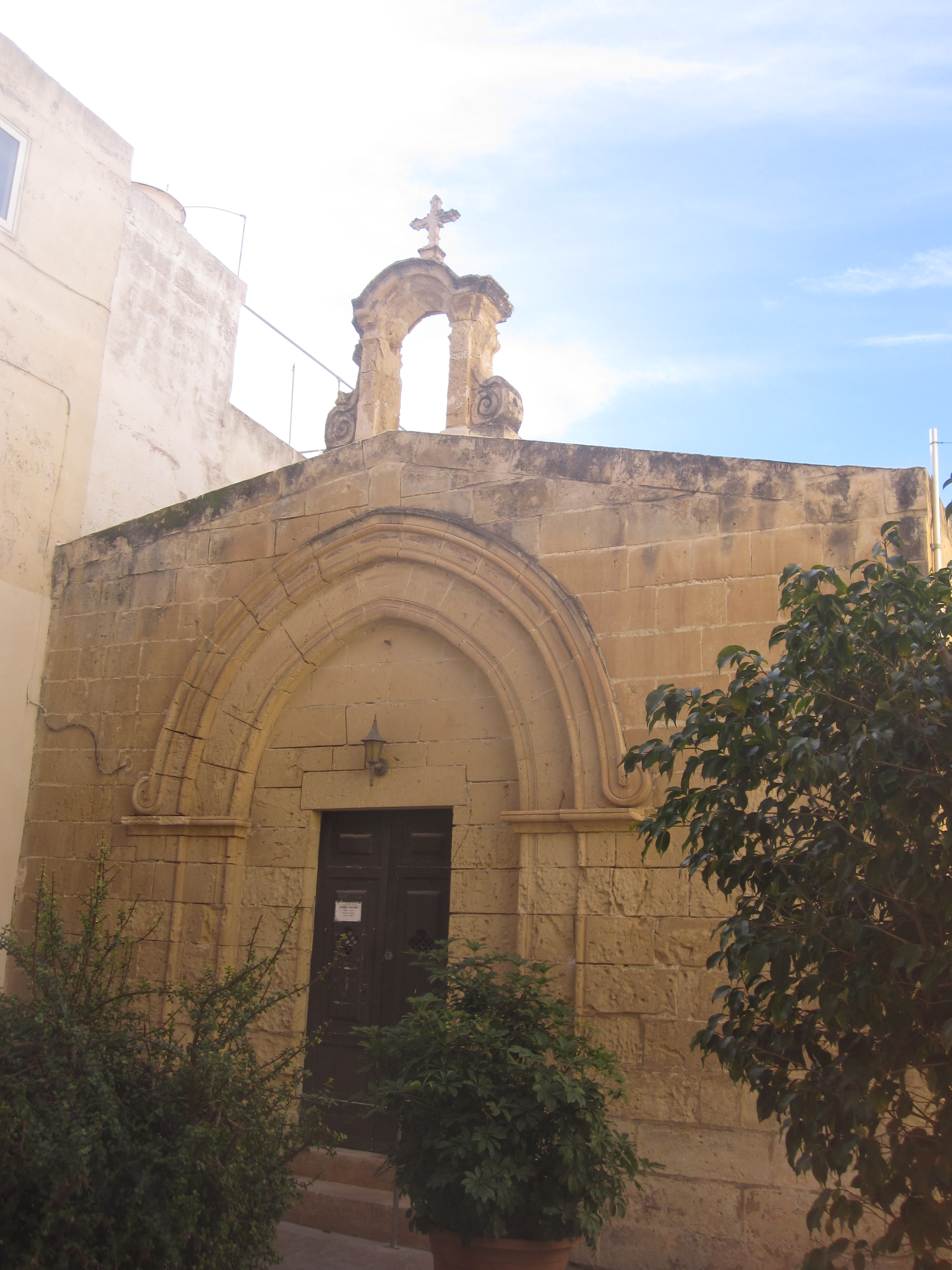

- Location within Malta
- 35°53′00.7″N 14°24′04.8″E
- Location: Rabat
- Country: Malta
- Denomination: Roman Catholic

History
- Founded: 1440; 586 years ago
- Founder: Costantin Bartolo
- Dedication: Saint Bartholomew

Architecture
- Style: Medieval

Administration
- Archdiocese: Malta

Clergy
- Archbishop: Charles Scicluna

The Chapel of St Bartholomew or St Bart's Chapel is a medieval Roman Catholic chapel located in Rabat, Malta. It is the only remaining chapel in town dating back from the Middle Ages.

== History ==
The present chapel was built sometime in 1440 by its founder Costantin Bartolo. Its façade is a typical medieval one with a pointed arc above the main door. Its interior also includes a number of pointed arches supporting the ceiling. In 1550 the chapel was restored. In 1670, Bishop Miguel Jerónimo de Molina mentions that the chapel was well kept. Moreover, at that time, a mass was celebrated every Sunday, with several masses on August 24, St Bartholomew's day. It was in this church in 1798 that Emmanuele Vitale planned and organised the uprising against the French who at that time were occupying Malta. During WWII the chapel was deconsecrated and used as a school room. Recently the chapel was restored and was reopened for religious purposes. Perpetual adoration takes place during the weekdays.
