= St Nicholas and St Lucy Chapel, Rabat =

St Nicholas and St Lucy Chapel
- The Chapel of St Nicholas and St Lucy
- Il-Kappella ta San Nikola u Santa Luċija
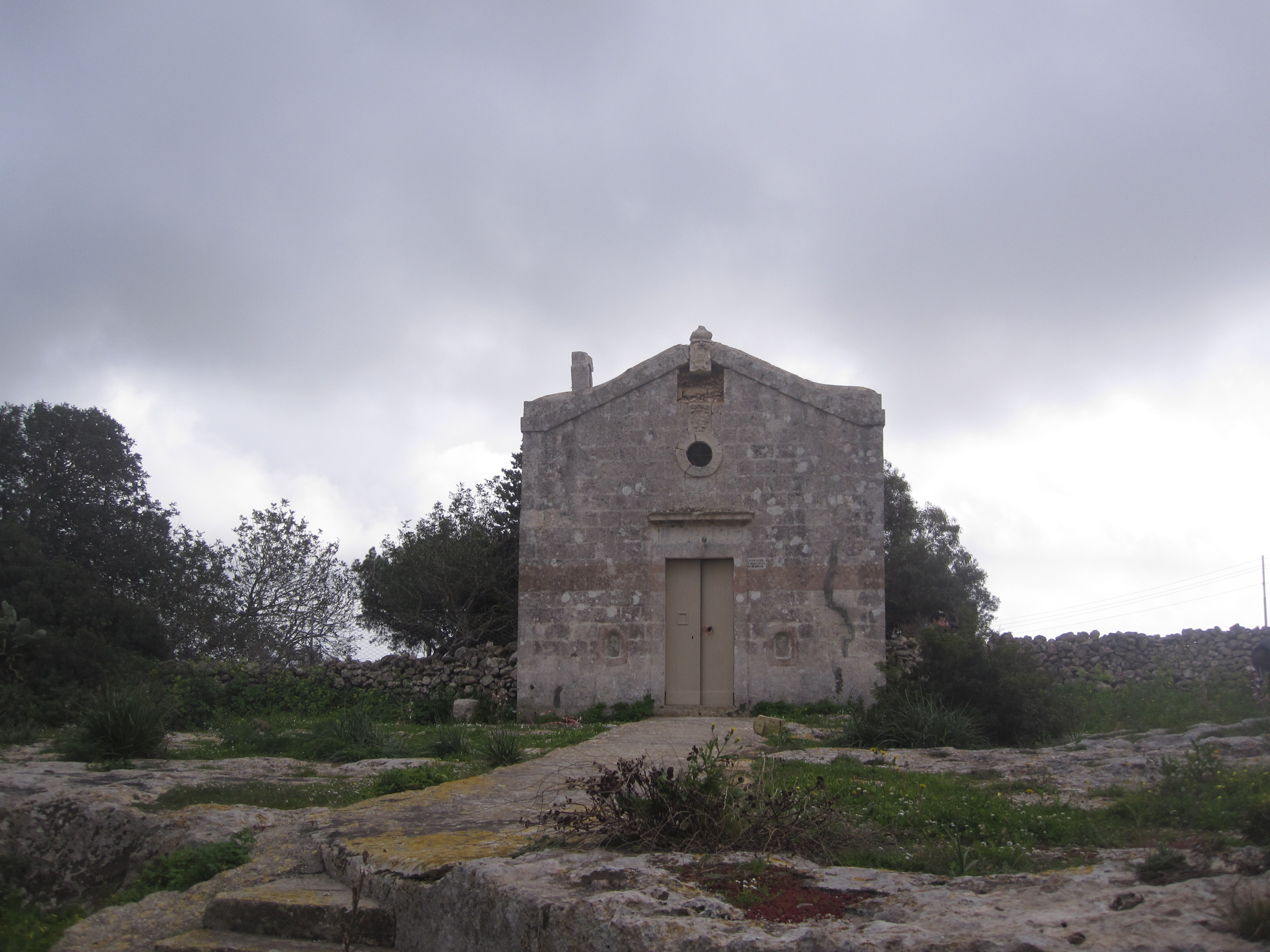

- Location within Malta
- 35°51′44.0″N 14°24′10.2″E
- Location: Siġġiewi
- Country: Malta
- Denomination: Roman Catholic

History
- Dedication: Saint Nicholas; Saint Lucy

Architecture
- Functional status: Church
- Completed: 1706

Administration
- Archdiocese: Malta

Clergy
- Archbishop: Charles Scicluna

The Chapel of St Nicholas and St Lucy is a small Roman Catholic chapel located in a woodland known as Buskett Gardens in Malta. The chapel is located close to Verdala Palace, the official summer residence of the President of the Republic.

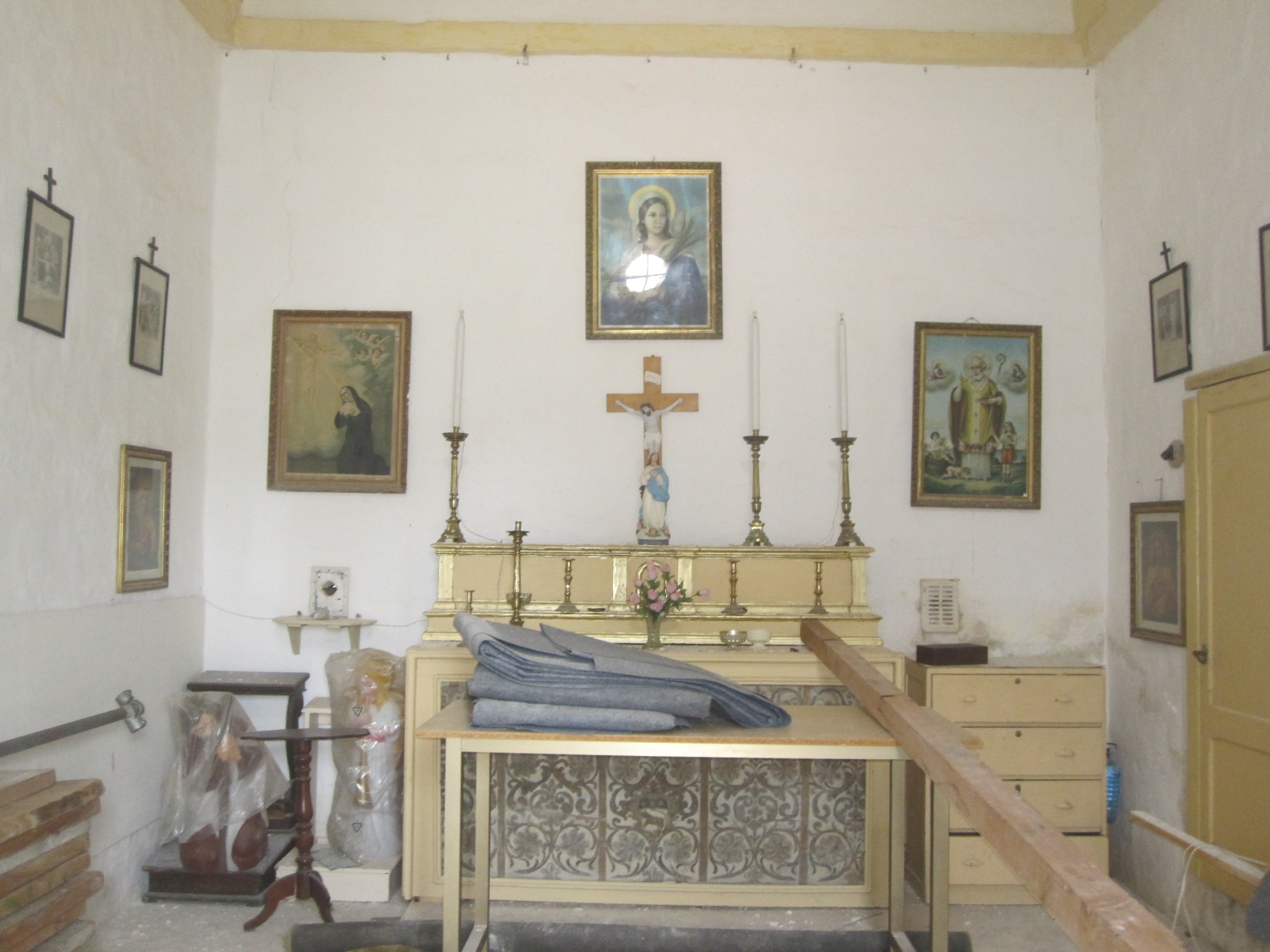
Interior of the chapel in 2017

== History ==
This small chapel was built in 1706 however an older church stood prior to the present one. In fact, originally there were two churches next to each other, one dedicated to Saint Nicholas and another to Saint Lucy. However, during inquisitor Pietro Dusina's apostolic visit to Malta in 1575, he ordered that the two churches be combined, Thus they were demolished and one was built instead. However this chapel collapsed and was later rebuilt by a certain Anton Agius in 1706. Bishop Davide Cocco Palmieri mentions that during his apostolic visit to Rabat between 1708 and 1710, the chapel was in a very good state and had one stone altar.

Prior to WWII, the cathedral chapter used to celebrate vespers on the respective feast days of the two saints which both fall in December. However, during WWII the chapel served as a refuge to various people. It did not suffer any structural damage during the war amidst the bombs that fell nearby however the titular painting did. Consequently, it had to be removed. After the war the chapel was handed over to the Augustinian friars of Rabat however it was abandoned until 1960 when a friar, Reverend Raphael Azzopardi, decided to restore it and bless it. In these past years the chapel was used by some groups for prayer services however lately the chapel was in a very bad state and in need of restoration.

== Interior ==
The chapel has one stone altar and three pictures depicting Saint Lucy, Saint Nicholas and St Rita of Cascia. There are also a set of Via crucis. the chapel's ceiling has a number of round arches which support the roof.
