= National Archives of Malta =

Official archive records repository

Coordinates: 35.8820°N 14.4013°E

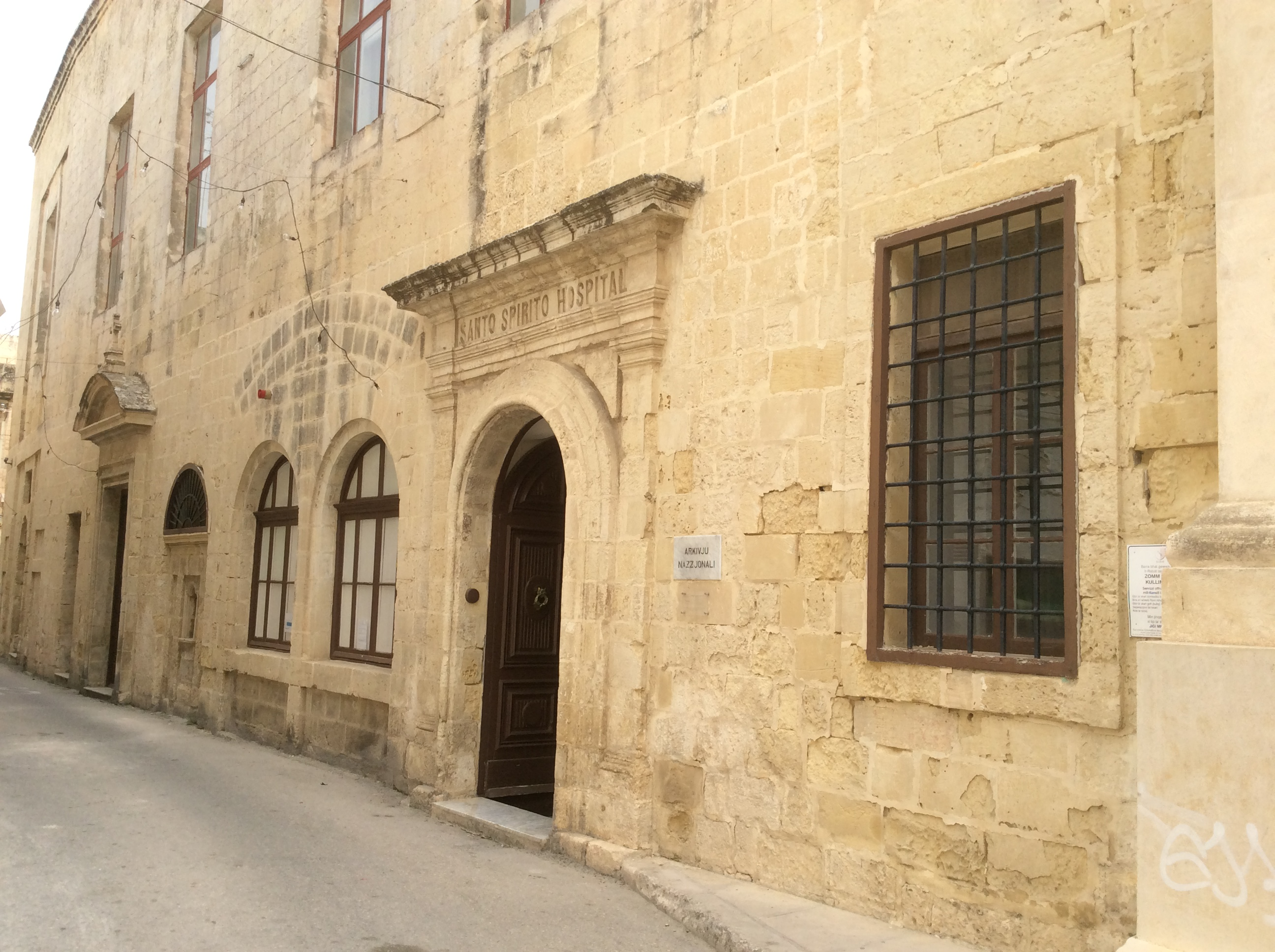
Head Office of the National Archives of Malta at the Santo Spirito Hospital of Rabat

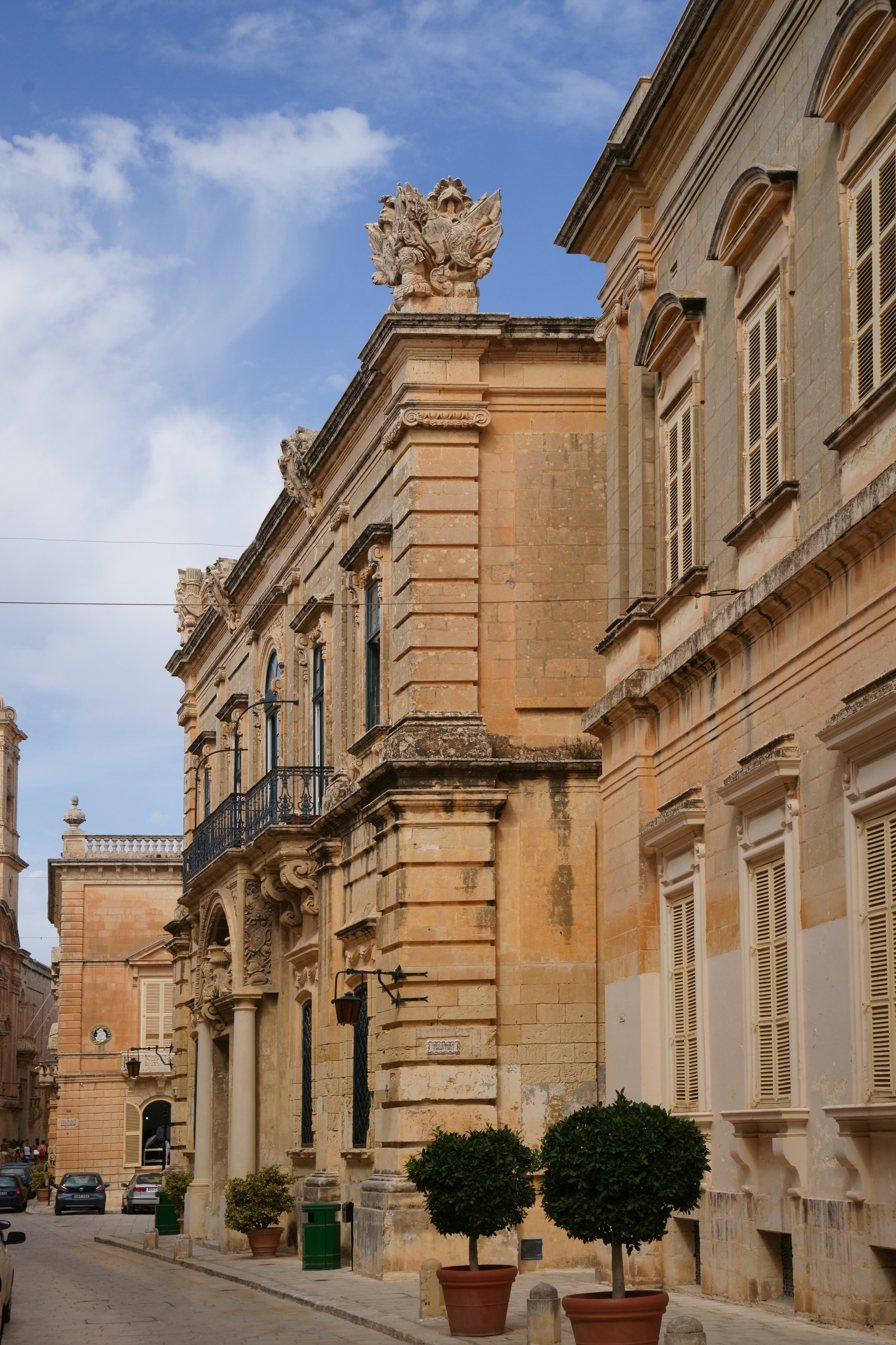
Legal Documentation Section of the National Archives of Malta at the Banca Giuratale of Mdina.

The National Archives of Malta (Maltese: L-Arkivji Nazzjonali ta' Malta) is the central archive maintained by the Mediterranean island nation of Malta. The Archives has been housed in the Grandmaster's Palace for most of its lifetime, having moved to three separate locations during the late 1980s. In 1988, the Legal Documentation Section of the National Archives of Malta was opened, after records of court and tribunal hearings and decisions had been transferred to a Mdina facility beginning the previous year. A Gozo facility was opened soon after, and in 1994, the then-President of Malta, Ugo Mifsud Bonnici, officially opened the Archives' new head office and main facility at the former Santo Spirito Hospital in Rabat. All of the Archives' locations feature a reading room, with facilities for researchers open to those over the age of sixteen who produce valid identification.

In recent years, the National Archives of Malta has been increasing its presence on the Internet, in line with many of its national archival counterparts throughout the world. This effort has included enabling members of the public to search the records of the Archives online, and view a short description of what is contained in the records found. Other efforts have included the digitising of a number of the Archives' holdings, the release of many of the Archives' publications on its web site, the sale of copies of the Archives' holdings through its 'e-shop', and an online presence for Malta's National Memory Project, dedicated to eternalising the memories of those who have contributed to the history of Malta.

== History ==
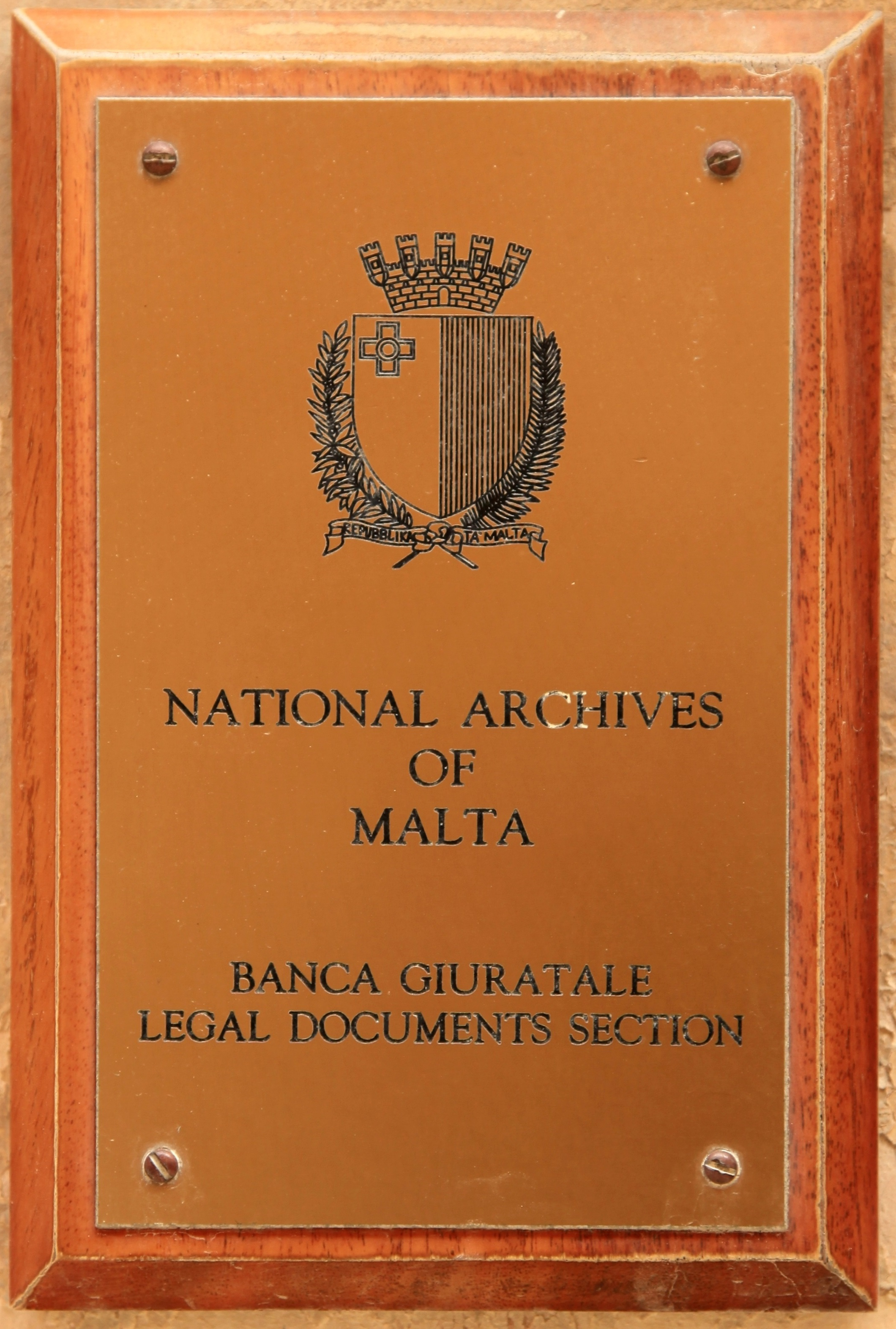
Sign of the National Archives at the Banca Giuratale

Efforts to establish a national archive began in 1971, when a Committee on the Preservation of Public Records was established by Guze’ Cassar Pullicino. One year later, in 1972, a section of Malta's public records at Casa Leoni was opened up to the public and research facilities were provided for the public's use. Initially under the oversight of Malta's Ministry for Justice and Parliamentary Affairs, the Archives moved to the Grandmaster's Palace, the home of the House of Representatives of Malta, within a few months. At that point, the government official in charge of the Archives was Michael Ellul.

In January 1986, a governmental committee was established to discuss options for the management of Malta's public records. It was decided that a stand-alone National Archives of Malta would be established, to be headquartered in Rabat in a building that once housed a hospital. In addition, the Banca Giuratale in Mdina was identified as suitable to house the records of Malta's courts from the beginning of the occupation of Malta by the Knights Hospitaller to the early period of occupation by the United Kingdom. In September 1987, the transfer of court records to the Mdina building began and was completed in October 1988. The transfer of all other records to the Rabat facility was not completed until July 28, 1989, and the official opening of the building did not occur until May 28, 1994, when Ugo Mifsud Bonnici, the fifth President of Malta, presided over the opening. At that time, the officer in charge was Joe Caruana.

The first regulating Act for the National Archives of Malta was Act IV, passed in 1990. Catalogues were published on CD-ROM, an annual lecture was established and an exhibition centre was opened. In 2005, Act V came into force, creating the post of National Archivist (currently Charles J. Farrugia) and created the National Archives as a legal person under the Government of Malta's umbrella. Since its opening, the National Archives have opened up three new facilities.

== Facilities and services ==
The National Archives of Malta maintains three facilities across Malta. The first facility to be opened was the Legal Documentation Section, located in Mdina, which was opened in 1988. This facility is located in an old bank building and houses court and tribunal records dating back to those decisions made under the Knights Hospitaller. The second facility is the Archives' Gozo location, which holds over 9,000 items. The final facility to be opened was the Head Office, located in Rabat, which was officially opened in 1994. This facility houses most of Malta's official records, and is the Archives' main facility.

The National Archives of Malta offers services available to all residents of Malta, although many of its on-site facilities are only open to residents over the age of sixteen years. The National Archives repositories contain reading rooms accessible to the public. Visitors are required to show identification to enter. The National Archives' reading rooms contain a reference library, printed catalogues, photocopying facilities, an information desk featuring a number of publications and fact sheets and tools for preserving Malta's records. Items stored in the archives may be accessed by members of the public by filling out a form. The records are then brought out to the requester's table. In addition, the National Archives features a number of maps, plans and drawings of various public locations in Malta, as well as photography work on royal celebrations and reconstruction work.

In addition, the National Archives of Malta offers a group and school visit program to increase public awareness of the records held there. Groups of 25 people or less may be taken through the Archives and shown what it has to offer, and school visits can be arranged in both the Archives' Rabat and Mdina locations. School students are shown through the Archives to increase awareness of what they have to offer and also shown how archived documents are handled. Students are also given the chance to experience the difficulty involved in cataloging and reorganising the Archives' items.

== Online services ==
The National Archives of Malta, like its counterparts in other areas of the world, has been moving to increase the availability of its services on the Internet. A number of items in its collection have been, or are in the process of being, digitised, and a catalogue listing search, along with a short description of each item, is available online on the Archives' web site. The Archives releases many of its publications, including periodical newsletters, its annual report and the State of the Archives report, on its web site, and maintains an 'e-shop' to facilitate the sale of copies of some of its text and image holdings to interested members of the public. It is also possible to search the holdings of Malta's National Memory Project, a memory of those who have contributed to the history of Malta, through the Archives' web site.

== See also ==
- List of national archives
- National Library of Malta
- Notarial Archives (Malta)
