= Wignacourt Museum =

Museum in Rabat, Malta

- The coat of arms of Alof de Wignacourt is used as the museum's logo

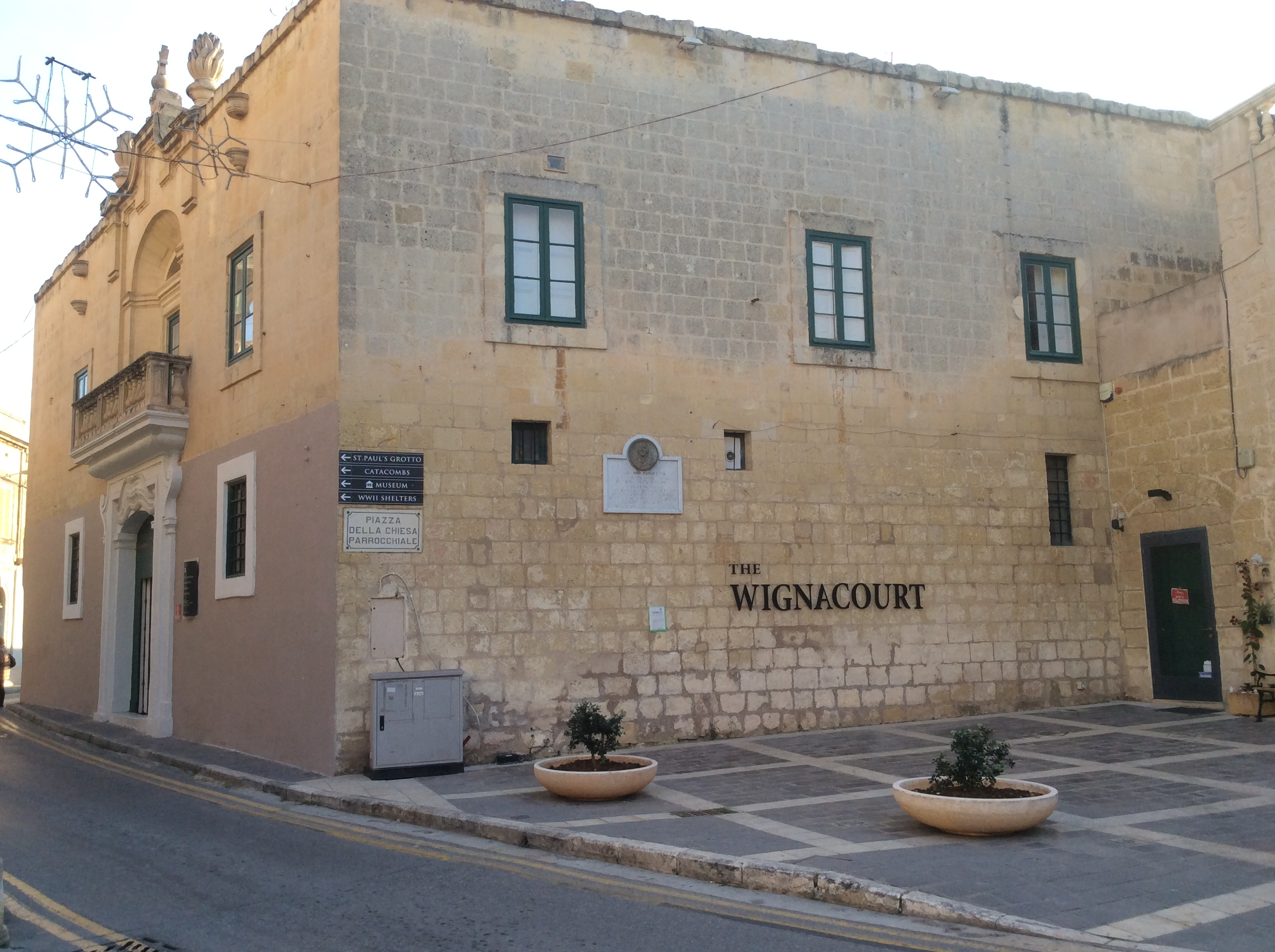
- View of the Wignacourt Museum
- Established: 24 June 1981
- Location: Rabat, Malta
- Coordinates: 35°52′53.9″N 14°23′55.9″E
- Founder: John Azzopardi
- Curator: John Azzopardi
- Website: www.wignacourtmuseum.com

The Wignacourt Museum is a museum in Rabat, Malta. It is housed in an 18th-century Baroque building which housed the Chaplains of the Order of St. John, and it is named after Grand Master Alof de Wignacourt, who ruled over the Maltese Islands between 1601 and 1622.

The museum is linked to St. Paul's Grotto, where Paul the Apostle is believed to have stayed while he was shipwrecked in Malta, as well as a number of hypogea and World War II-era air raid shelters. Its collections mainly focus on art and religious artifacts.

== History ==
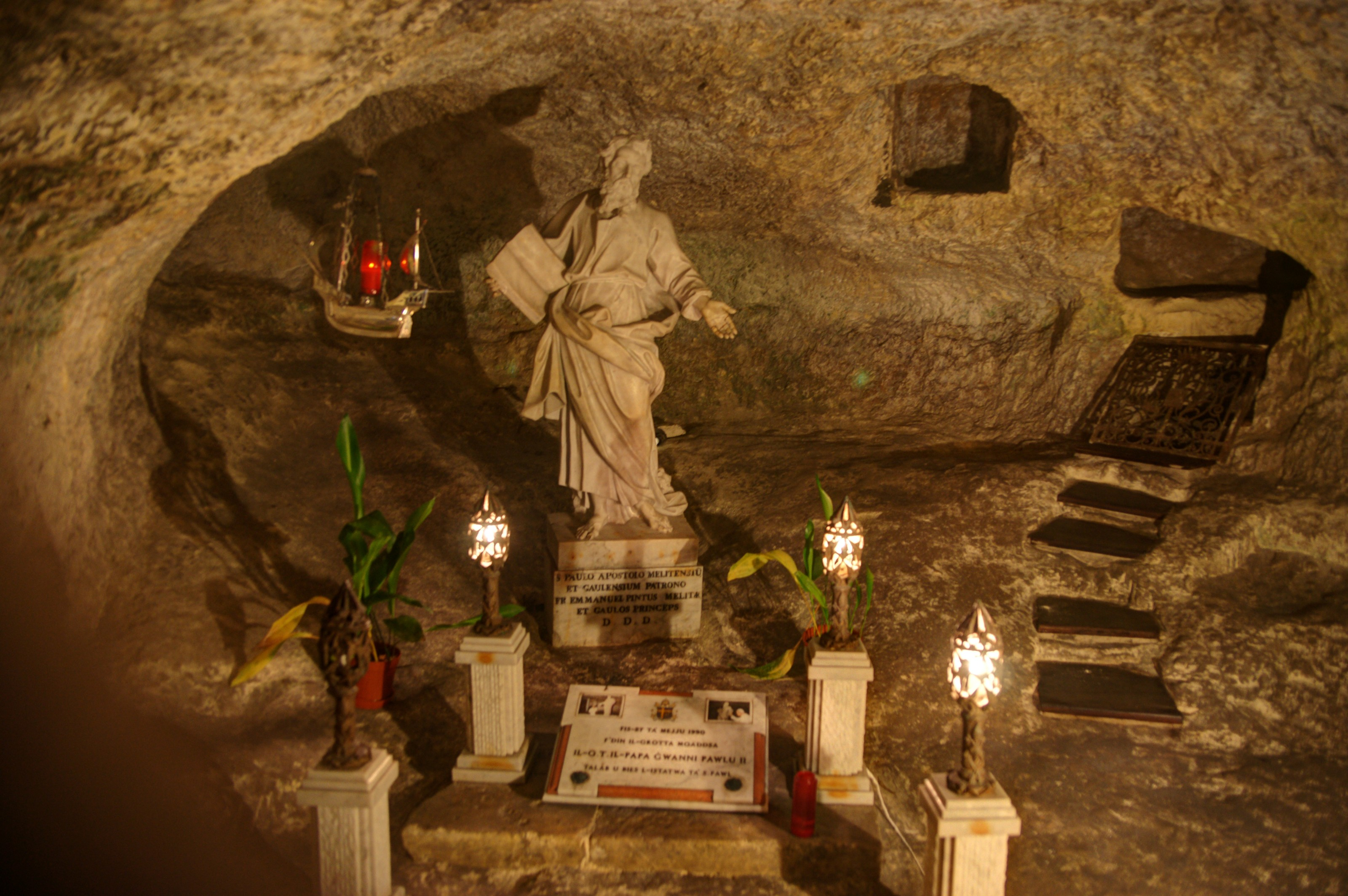
The museum is linked to St. Paul's Grotto

St. Paul's Grotto is a grotto in which Paul the Apostle is believed to have stayed in while he was shipwrecked in Malta, and it is located beneath the Collegiate church of St. Paul. The grotto had become a popular pilgrimage site by the early 17th century, and in 1610 it was entrusted to the Spanish hermit Juan Benegas de Cordoba. In 1617, control of the grotto was passed to the Order of St. John, and Grand Master Alof de Wignacourt raised the status of the grotto and the church above it to a collegiate church in 1619. He also established the Wignacourt College in order to manage the church and the grotto.

The building which now houses the Wignacourt Museum was built in 1749 to house this collegiate. It is constructed in the Baroque style, and it contains three levels. The underground level is linked to St. Paul's Grotto, and it also contains a number of Punic, Roman and Early Christian hypogea which are interconnected with a complex of World War II-era air raid shelters. The building includes a garden and a small chapel, which was originally used for private worship by the chaplains.

Following the French occupation of Malta in 1798, the college remained in use by the church, but it was administered by the government. In World War II and the subsequent years, the building was used as a school, an infirmary and as a parish and social centre.

In 1961, the government returned the college to the church, and it became administered by the parish of Rabat. On 24 June 1981, the building was opened as a museum, containing exhibits from the college itself, the Church of St. Paul and a number of affiliated churches, as well as other artifacts donated by private individuals. The core of the museum's art gallery is based on the collection of notary Francesco Catania.

The building which houses the museum is scheduled as a Grade 1 national monument by the Malta Environment and Planning Authority.

== Collections ==
An art gallery is found on the museum's main floor, and it contains paintings by a number of artists including Mattia Preti, Antoine de Favray and Francesco Zahra. The collections also include several sculptures, an altar which was used to celebrate Mass on Hospitaller galleys, antique silverware, relics, pottery, coins, maps, rare books and prints.

== Gallery ==
Interior and exterior
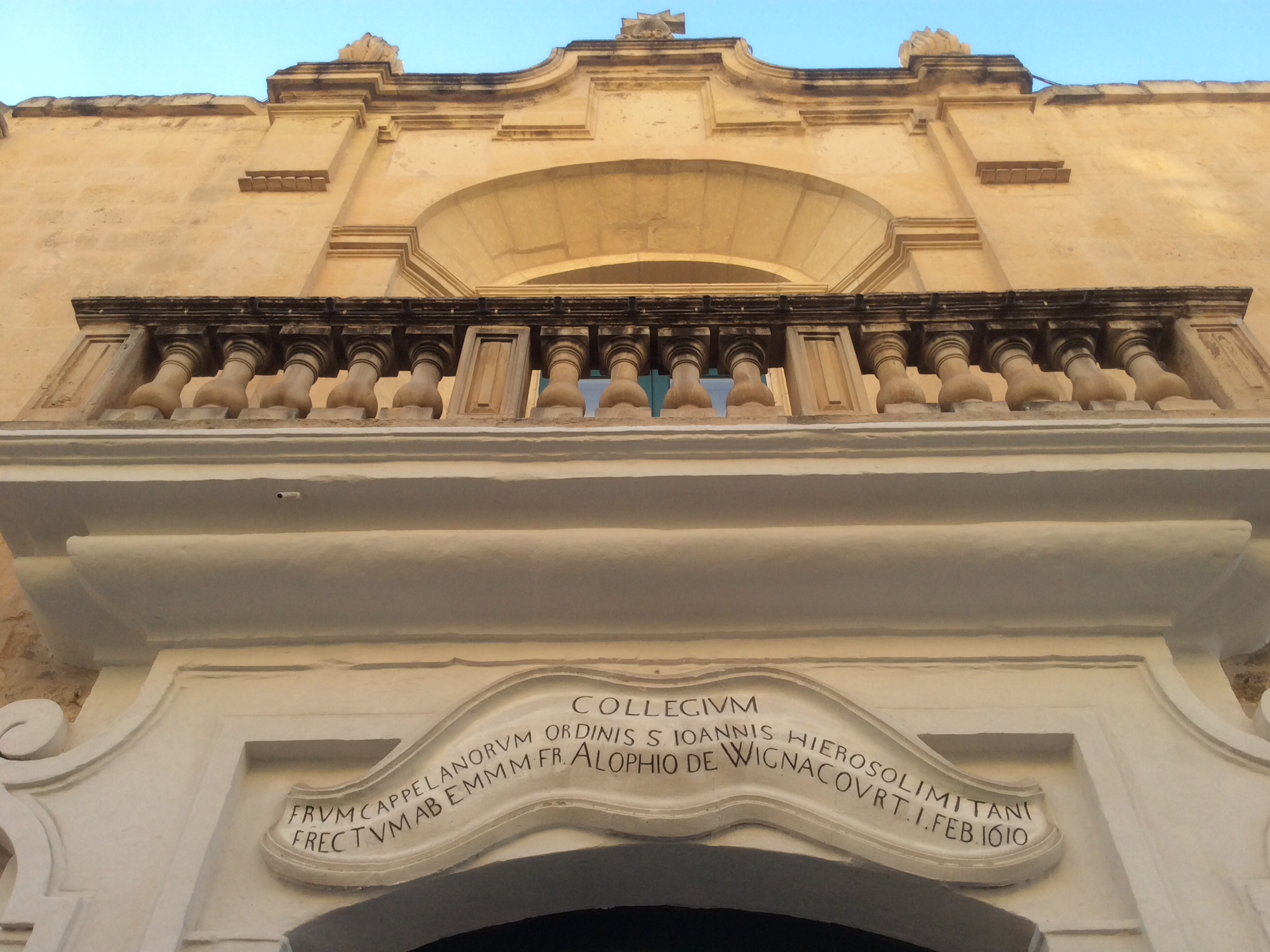
Inscription on the main door

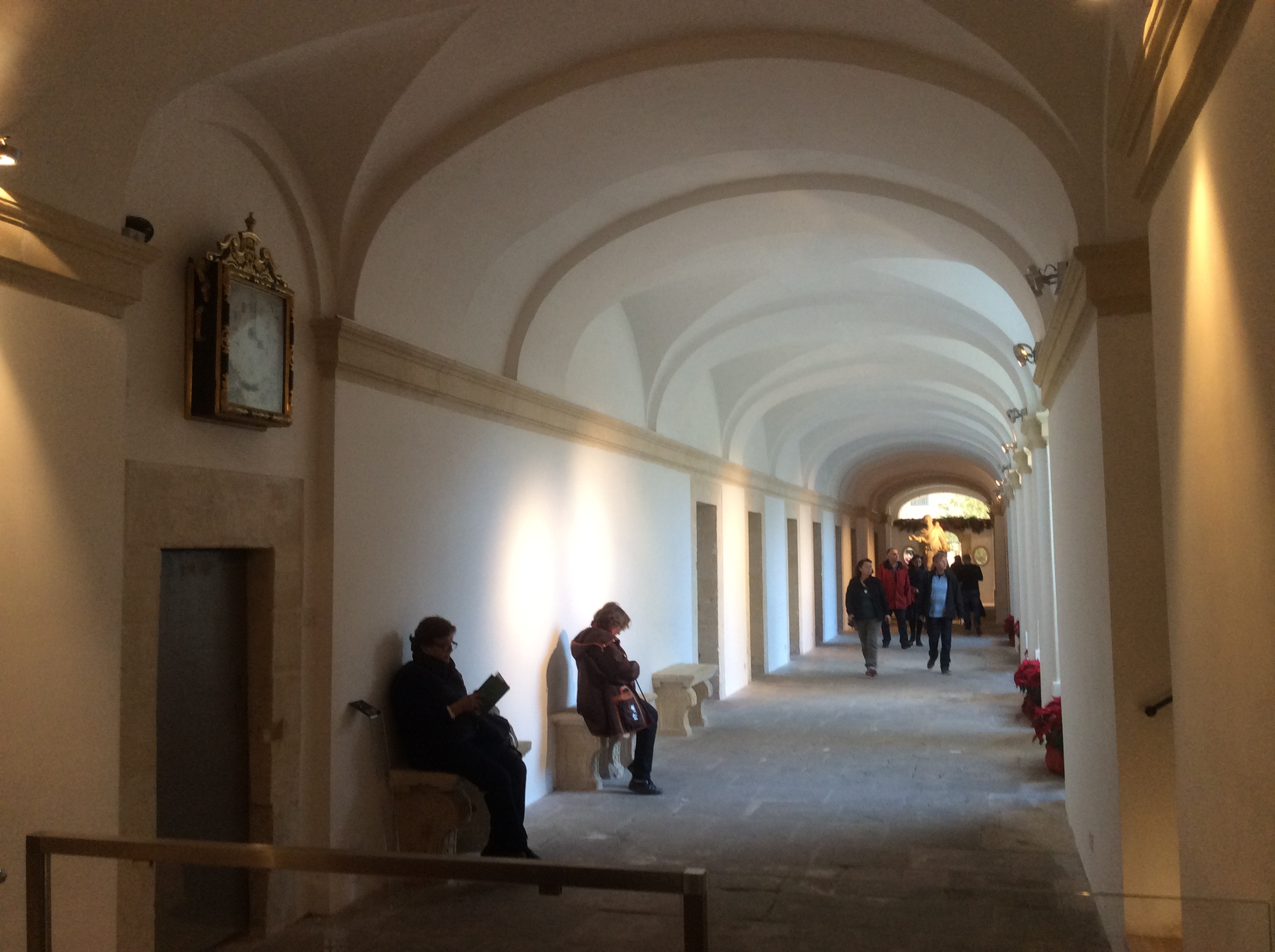
Main hall

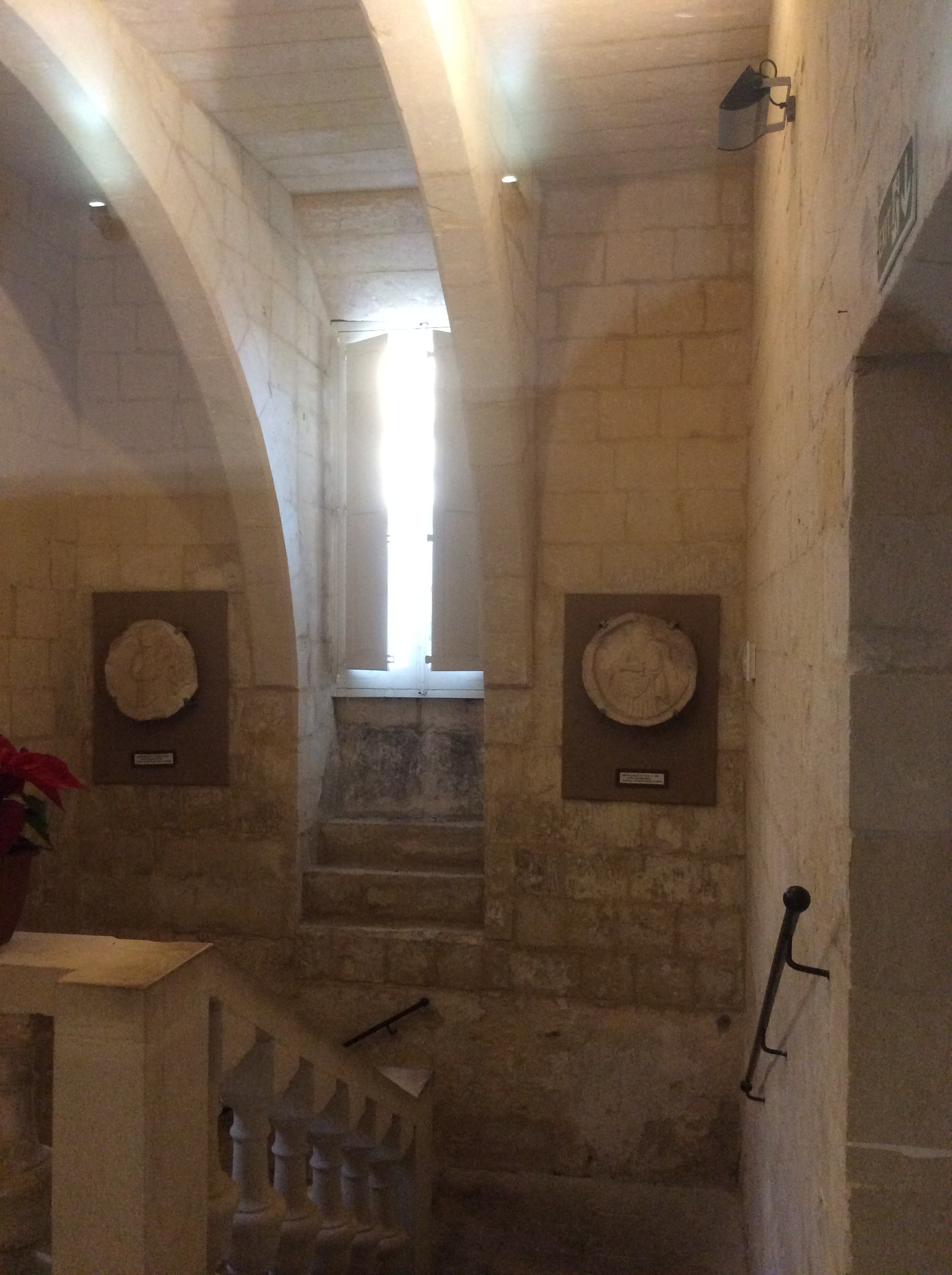
Staircase at the museum

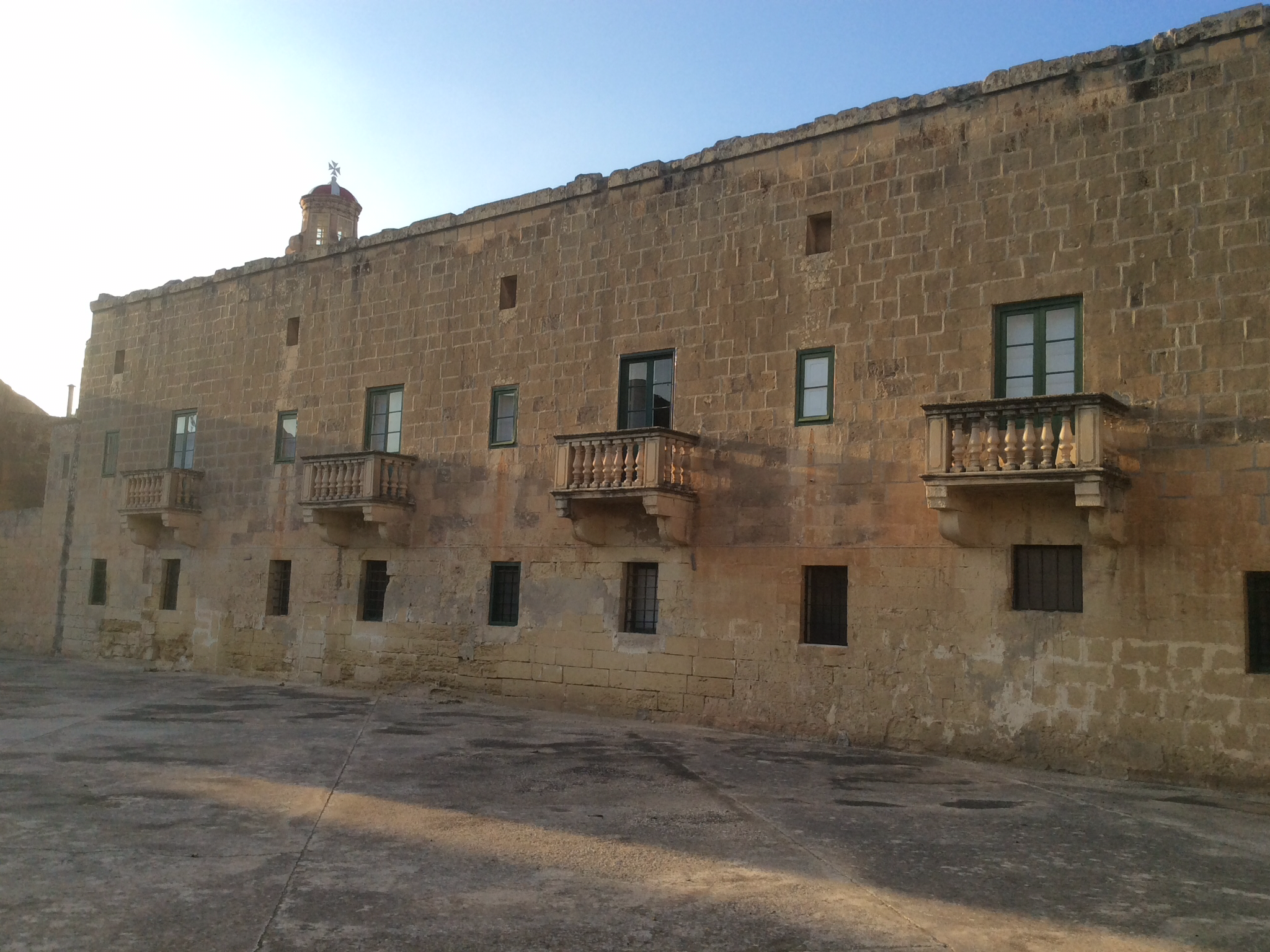
Courtyard at the Wignacourt and rear façade

== See also ==
- List of museums in Malta
