= Basilica of St Paul, Rabat =

Roman Catholic Parish church in Rabat, Malta

Basilica of St Paul
- The Basilica and Collegiate Proto-Parish Church of Saint Paul
- Il-Bażilika Kolleġġjata u Proto-Parrokkjali ta' San Pawl
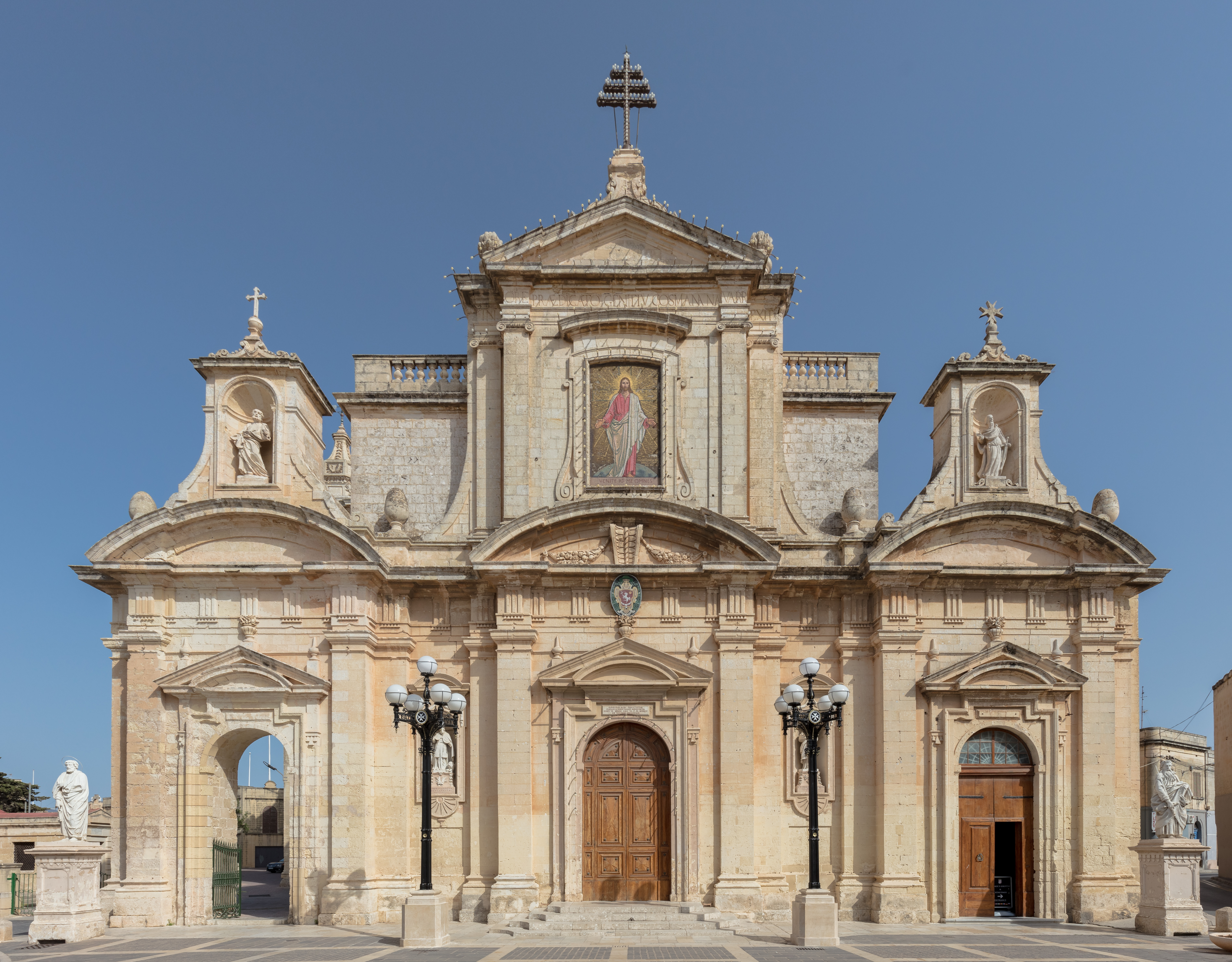
- The church's façade in 2021
- Basilica of St Paul
- 35°52′54.1″N 14°23′57.2″E
- Location: Rabat, Malta
- Denomination: Roman Catholic
- Website: sanpawl.rabatmalta.com

History
- Status: Active
- Dedication: St Paul
- Consecrated: 21 September 1726

Architecture
- Functional status: Minor Basilica; Collegiate; Parish church
- Architect: Francesco Buonamici
- Architectural type: Church
- Style: Baroque
- Completed: 1783

Specifications
- Materials: Limestone

Administration
- Archdiocese: Malta
- Parish: Rabat

The Basilica of St Paul is a Roman Catholic Parish church located in Rabat, Malta.

== History ==
The church is built on the edge of the site of the Roman city Melite, which included all of Mdina and a large part of present-day Rabat. There were numerous churches built on the site of the present church which dates from the 17th century. In 1336 bishop Hilarius refers to the church as ecclesia Sancti Pauli de crypta, and also mentions the cemetery and the Roman ditch.

The present church was built to replace a church which was completed in 1578. The new church was built with funds provided by the noble woman Guzmana Navarra on plans prepared by Francesco Buonamici. Commenced in 1653, the church building was completed by Lorenzo Gafà in 1683. Annexed with the church of St Paul is a smaller church dedicated to St Publius which was rebuilt in 1692 and again in 1726 by Salvu Borg. The church was elevated to a Minor Basilica in 2020.

== The grotto ==
Entrance to the grotto is through the church of St Publius, linked to the Wignacourt Museum. The church is listed on the National Inventory of the Cultural Property of the Maltese Islands.

The grotto is the place where according to tradition St Paul lived and preached during his three months stay in Malta in 60 A.D. In 1748 Grand Master Pinto donated a statue of St Paul for the grotto. The grotto was visited by various Popes, Pope John Paul II in 1990 and 2001 and Pope Benedict XVI in 2010. It was visited the third time by Pope Francis during his apostolic journey to the Maltese islands on 2 April 2022.
