= Rabat, Malta =

Rabat Ir-Rabat
- Local council
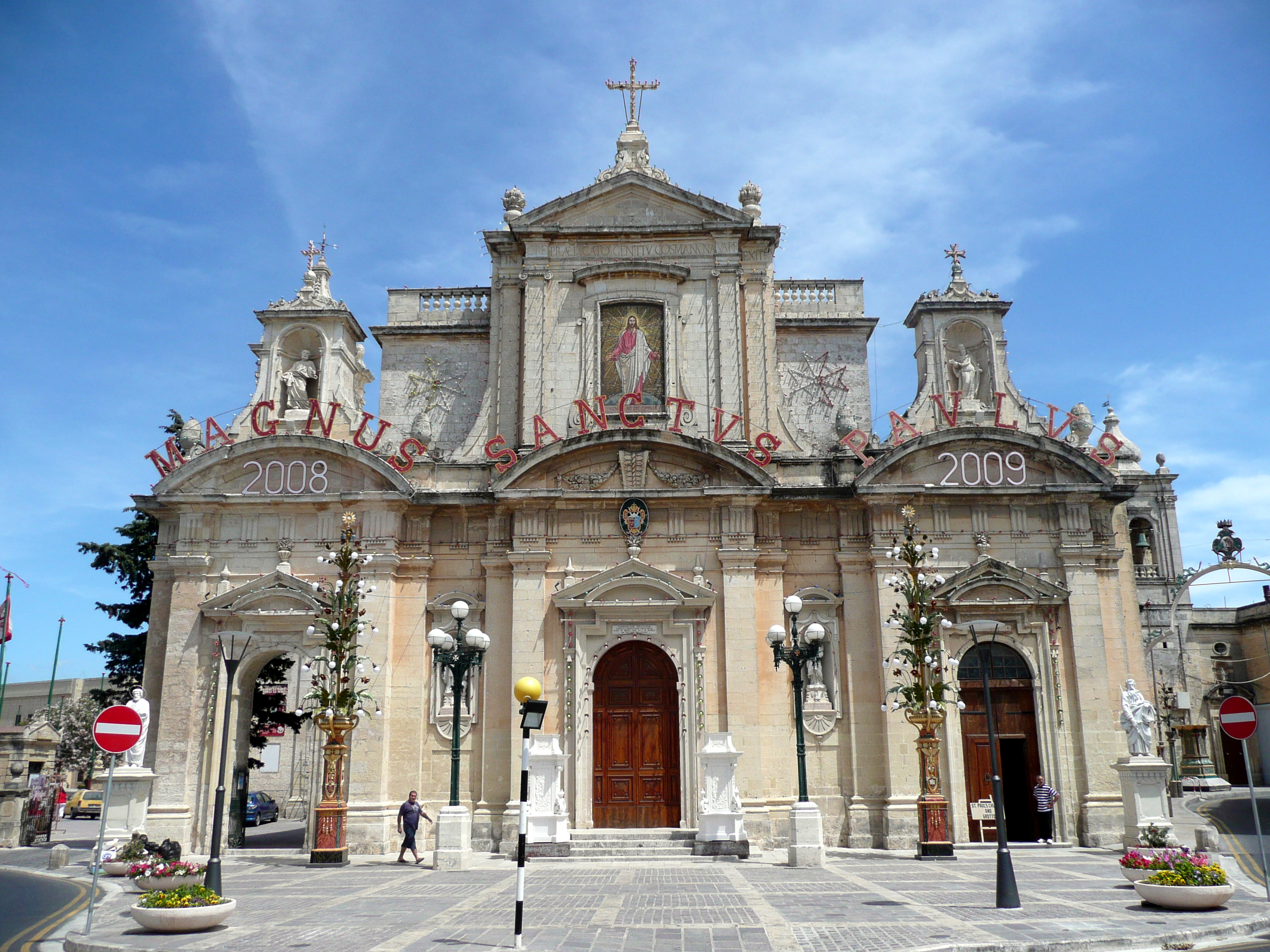
- Collegiate Basilica of St. Paul in Rabat

- Flag Coat of arms
- Motto: Ġawhra Prezzjuża Magħrufa Tleqq (Original Latin: Notabilis gemma fulget) (English: A precious gem known as radiant.)
- Coordinates: 35°52′54″N 14°23′56″E
- Country: Malta
- Region: Western Region
- District: Western District
- Borders: Attard, Dingli, Mdina, Mġarr, Mosta, Mtarfa, Siġġiewi, Żebbuġ

Government
  - Type: Mayor–council government
  - Body: Rabat Local Council
  - Mayor: Sandro Craus (PL)

Area
  - Total: 26.64 km^{2} (10.29 sq mi)

Population (Jul 2024)
  - Total: 12,329
  - Density: 462.8/km^{2} (1,199/sq mi)
- Demonym(s): Rabti (m), Rabtija (f), Rabtin (pl)
- Time zone: UTC+1 (CET)
  - Summer (DST): UTC+2 (CEST)
- Postal code: RBT
- Dialing code: 356
- ISO 3166 code: MT-46
- Patron saint: Saint Paul; Saint Joseph; Corpus Christi; Our Lady of The Girdle; Our Lady of Good Health; Saint Martin; Immaculate Conception
- Day of festa: First Sunday of July; March 19; Second Sunday of June; First Sunday of September; Second Sunday of October; Nearest Sunday to November 11; December 8
- Website: www.rabatlocalcouncil.com

Rabat (Maltese: Ir-Rabat [ɪˈrːɐbɐt]) is a town in the Western Region of Malta. It adjoins the ancient capital city of Mdina, and a north-western part of Rabat was in the Roman city of Melite until its medieval retrenchment. The population of Rabat was 12,329 in July 2024. This included 6,249 males and 6,080 females; 10,996 Maltese nationals and 1,333 foreign nationals.

The Apostolic Nunciature of the Holy See to the Republic of Malta is seated in this village. The Local Council of Rabat is also the administrator of Baħrija. Parts of the films Munich and Black Eagle were shot in Rabat. In December 1999, Mtarfa was split from Rabat to form a separate Local Council by Act XXI, an amendment to the Local Council Act of 1993 (Act XV). In 2021, Rabat was transferred from the Northern Region to the newly-created Western Region as part of a reorganization of the regions of Malta.

== Etymology ==
Rabat is an Arabic word which can mean "fortified town" or "suburb". The Arabic term Ribat refers to a small fortification to host military volunteers.

== Catacombs ==
Rabat is home to the Catacombs of St. Paul and of St. Agatha. The Romans dug these catacombs outside their city as a burial place for the dead; they considered burial in the city unhygienic. Mdina and parts of Rabat were later built on top of the ancient Roman city of Melite. The Maltese catacombs were never meant to be hiding places during persecutions or as living quarters.

The Catacombs of St. Paul are now administered by Heritage Malta. Part of St. Paul's Catacombs, the part accessible from the Parish tradition and as recorded in the Bible, St. Paul stayed here for three months when he was shipwrecked on the island in AD 60.

In the Catacombs of St Agatha's, there are over 500 graves of several types, the majority being children's graves. There are sections for pagans and Jews, as well as for Christians. There are also unique frescoes. Another feature of the Maltese catacombs is the agape table, two of which, carved out of bedrock, were found in the Catacombs of St. Paul.

== Buildings ==
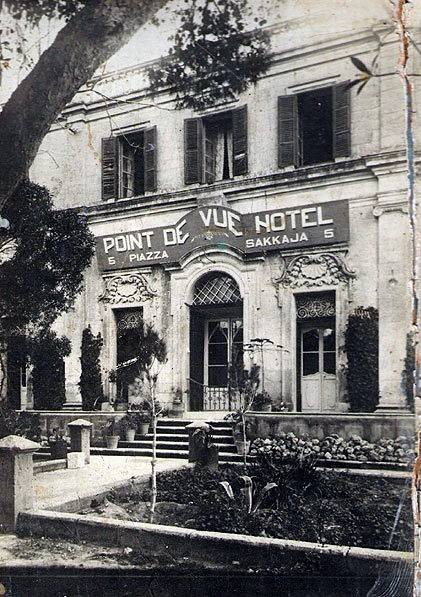
Hotel Point de Vue, Rabat, in the 1930s

- St Pauls Collegiate and Grotto
- Nativity of Our Lady church (k.a. Ta’Qasha) in St Rita Street.
- St. Pauls - Count Roger Band Club
- Archbishop Seminary
- Augustinian Priory
- Annunciation Church (Carmelite Fathers)
- Casa Cosmana Navarra
- Church dedicated to St Martin of Tours (Baħrija)
- Church of the Nativity of the Virgin Mary (Mtaħleb)
- Church of St. Catherine (Tad-Daħla)
- Church of the Immaculate Conception (Wied Gerżuma)
- Church of the Nativity of the Virgin Mary (Tas-Salib)
- Church of the Blessed Virgin (Dominican Order)
- Church of the Blessed Virgin (Franciscan Minors)
- Church of St. Francis (Conventual Franciscans)
- Collegiate Basilica of St Paul
- Count Roger Band Club
- Dominican Priory
- Domus Romana
- Dwejra Lines
- Fort Binġemma
- Għajn Għeriexem
- L’Isle Adam Band Club
- Loġġa tal-Palju
- Saint Nicholas College - (Primary School A and B)
- Santo Spirito Hospital - (National Archives of Malta)
- Sanctuary of Our Lady of Good Health
- St. Agatha’s Catacombs and Crypt
- St. Agatha's Church (Missionary Society of St Paul)
- St. Bartholomew's Church
- St. Catald's Church
- St. Luke Pastoral Centre - Nigret
- St. Mark's Church (Augustinians)
- St. Paul's Catacombs
- St. Paul's Missionary College
- St. Sebastian's Church
- Ta' Duna Church
- Museum Station
- Nicola Saura Hospital – Ospiza Saura
- Niche of St. Paul in Saqqajja
- Wignacourt Museum

== Districts in Rabat ==
- Baħrija
- Bieb ir-Ruwa
- Landrijiet
- Għajn Qajjet
- Għar Barka
- Kunċizzjoni
- Fomm ir-Riħ
- Miġra Ferħa
- Tas-Salvatur
- Tas-Salib
- Il-Lunzjata
- Għemieri (Gomerino)
- Għajn Klieb
- Ħofra ta' Ritz
- Il-Ħemsija
- Misraħ Suffara
- Mtaħleb
- Nigret
- Nigret tal-Ħarruba
- Raba Nemel
- Ras ir-Raħeb
- Rdum tal-Lunzjata
- Rdum tal-Vigarju
- Ħal-Bajjada
- Ta'Qasgha`
- Ta' Busugrilla
- Ta' Cassia
- Ta' Fantin
- Ta' Gerżuma
- Ta' Lawrenti
- Ta' Manduca
- Ta' Namura
- Ta' Sirena
- Tal-Infetti
- Tabja
- Tal-Forok
- Tal-Marġa
- Tal-Virtù
- Tat-Torri
- Tax-Xieref
- Ras ir-Raħeb
- Santa Katarina (tad-Daħla)
- Saqqajja
- Wied Gerżuma
- Wied il-Baħrija
- Wied il-Bużbież
- Wied il-Fiddien
- Wied iż-Żebbuġ
- Wied Liemu
- Wied Rini
- Wied tal-Isqof
- Wied tal-Marġa
- Xagħra tal-Isqof

== Thoroughfares ==
- Misraħ il-Parroċċa (Parish Square)
- Misraħ San Duminku (Sant Dominic Square)
- Pjazza tas-Saqqajja (Saqqajja Square)
- Telgħa tas-Saqqajja (Saqqajja Hill)
- Triq Ġorġ Borg Olivier (George Borg Olivier Road)
- Triq Għajn Qajjet (Ghajn Qajjet Road)
- Triq Għeriexem (Gheriexem Street)
- Triq Ħad-Dingli (Dingli Road)
- Triq Ħal Bajjada (Hal Bajjada Street)
- Triq il-Buskett (Buskett Road)
- Triq il-Kbira (Main Street)
- Triq il-Kulleġġ (College Street)
- Triq it-Tiġrija (Tigrija Street)
- Triq Santa Rita (St Rita Street)
- Triq tat-Tabija (Tabija Street)
- Vjal il-Ħaddiem (Labour Avenue)

== Band clubs and feasts ==
- St. Paul, Conte Roger Band Club (Każin San Pawl Banda Konti Ruġġieru)
- St. Joseph, L'Isle Adam Band Club A.D. 1860 (L-Għaqda Mużikali L'Isle Adam A.D. 1860) http://www.bandalisleadam.com/
- Festa Titulari tal-martirju ta’ San Pawl http://sanpawl.rabatmalta.com
- Festa Sekondarja ta' San Gużepp http://sanguzepp.rabatmalta.com
- Festa Prinċipali u Solenni ta' Corpus Domini
- Festa tal-Madonna taċ-Ċintura http://www.rabatmalta.com/amcsaa
- Festa ta' Santa Katarina tad-daħla
- Festa ta' San Anton Abbati
- Festa tal-Madonna tas-Saħħa
- Festa tal-Immakulata Kunċizzjoni
- Festa tat-Twelid ta-Marija - l-Imtaħleb
- Festa ta' San Martin - Baħrija

== Sport ==
Rabat has its own football club called Rabat Ajax F.C. Rabat won the Maltese Premier League twice (1984–85 Maltese Premier League and 1985–86 Maltese Premier League), and the Maltese Cup once in 1986.

== Twin towns – sister cities ==
Rabat is twinned with:

- Tarquinia, Italy
