= History of Malta =

Maltese history

Malta has been inhabited since 6400 BC initially by Mesolithic hunter gatherers, who were replaced by Neolithic farmers from Sicily around 5400 BC. These farmers practiced mixed farming after clearing most of the existing conifer forest that dominated the islands, but their agricultural methods degraded the soil until the islands became uninhabitable. The islands were repopulated around 3850 BC by a civilization that, at its peak, built the Megalithic Temples, which today are among the oldest surviving buildings in the world. Their civilization collapsed in around 2350 BC; the islands were repopulated by Bronze Age people soon afterwards.

Malta's prehistory ended around 700 BC, when the islands were colonized by the Phoenicians. They ruled the islands until they fell in 218 BC to the Roman Republic. The island was acquired by the Eastern Romans or Byzantines in the 6th century AD, who were expelled by Aghlabids following a siege in 870 AD. Malta may have been sparsely populated for a few centuries until being repopulated by Arabs in the 11th century. The islands were invaded by the Norman County of Sicily in 1091, and a gradual re-Christianization of the islands followed. At this point, the islands became part of the Kingdom of Sicily and were dominated by successive feudal rulers, including the Swabians, the Aragonese, and eventually the Spanish. The islands were given to the Order of St. John in 1530, which ruled them as a vassal state of Sicily. In 1565, the Ottoman Empire attempted to take the islands in the Great Siege of Malta, but the invasion was repelled. The Order continued to rule Malta for over two centuries, and this period was characterized by a flourishing of the arts and architecture and an overall improvement in the social order. The Order was expelled after the French First Republic invaded the islands in 1798, marking the beginning of the French occupation of Malta.

After a few months of French rule, the Maltese rebelled and the French were expelled in 1800. Malta became a British protectorate, becoming a de facto colony in 1813. The islands became an important naval base for the British, serving as the headquarters of the Mediterranean Fleet. During the last quarter of the 19th century, there were advancements in technology and finance. In subsequent years, the Anglo-Egyptian Bank was established in 1882 and the Malta Railway began operating in 1883. In 1921, London granted self-government to Malta. This resulted in the establishment of a bicameral parliament consisting of a Senate (which was later eliminated in 1949) and an elected Legislative Assembly. The Crown Colony of Malta was self-governing in 1921–1933, 1947–1958, and 1962–1964.

During World War II British forces in Malta were heavily attacked by Italian and German air power, but the British held firm. In 1942 the island was awarded the George Cross, which today appears on Malta's flag and coat of arms.

In 1964 Malta became an independent Commonwealth realm known as the State of Malta, and in 1974 it became a republic while remaining in the Commonwealth. Since 2004 the country has been a member state of the European Union.

== Pleistocene ==
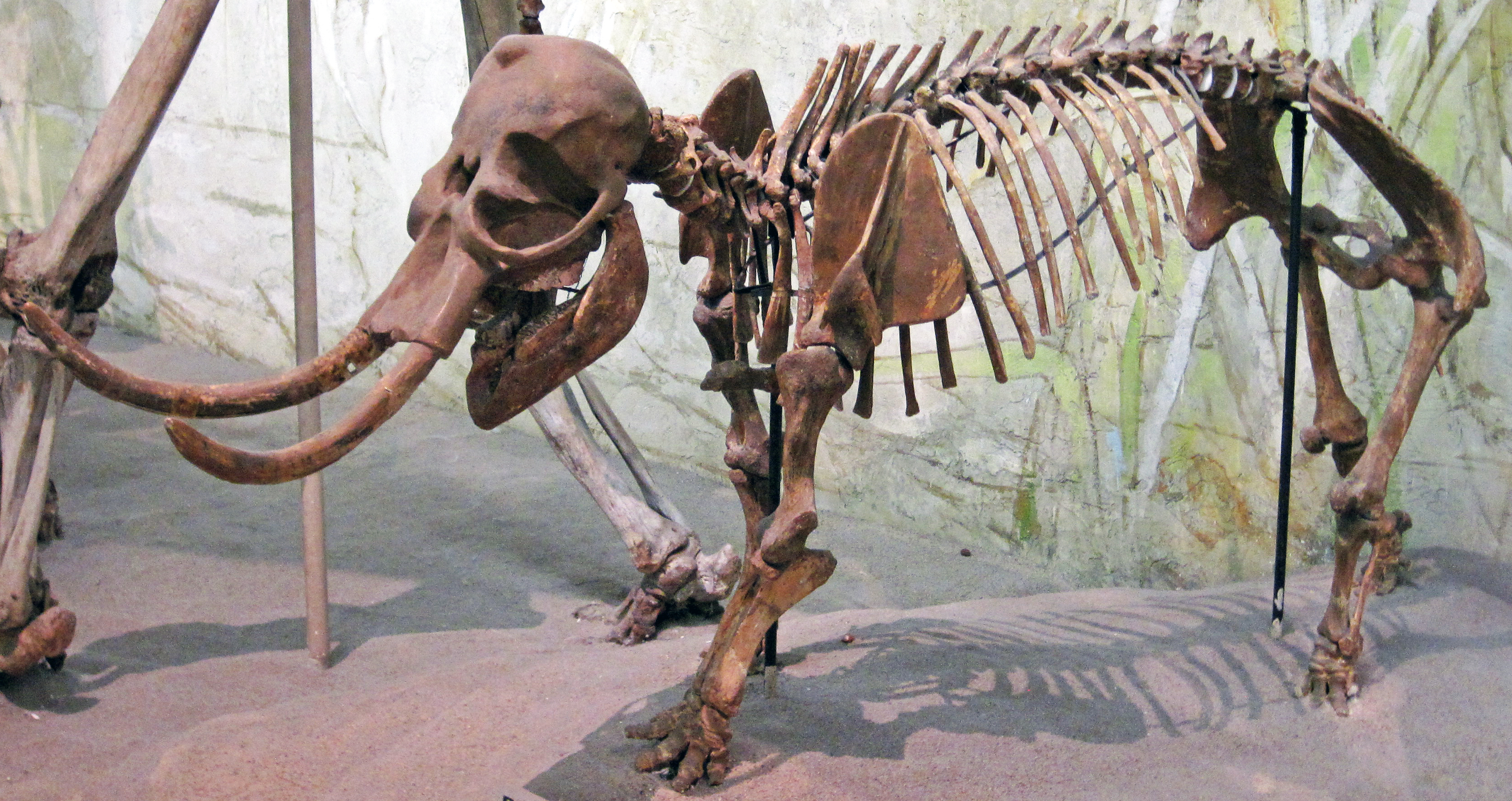
Skeleton of Palaeoloxodon falconeri, a sheep-sized dwarf elephant once native to Malta during the Pleistocene period

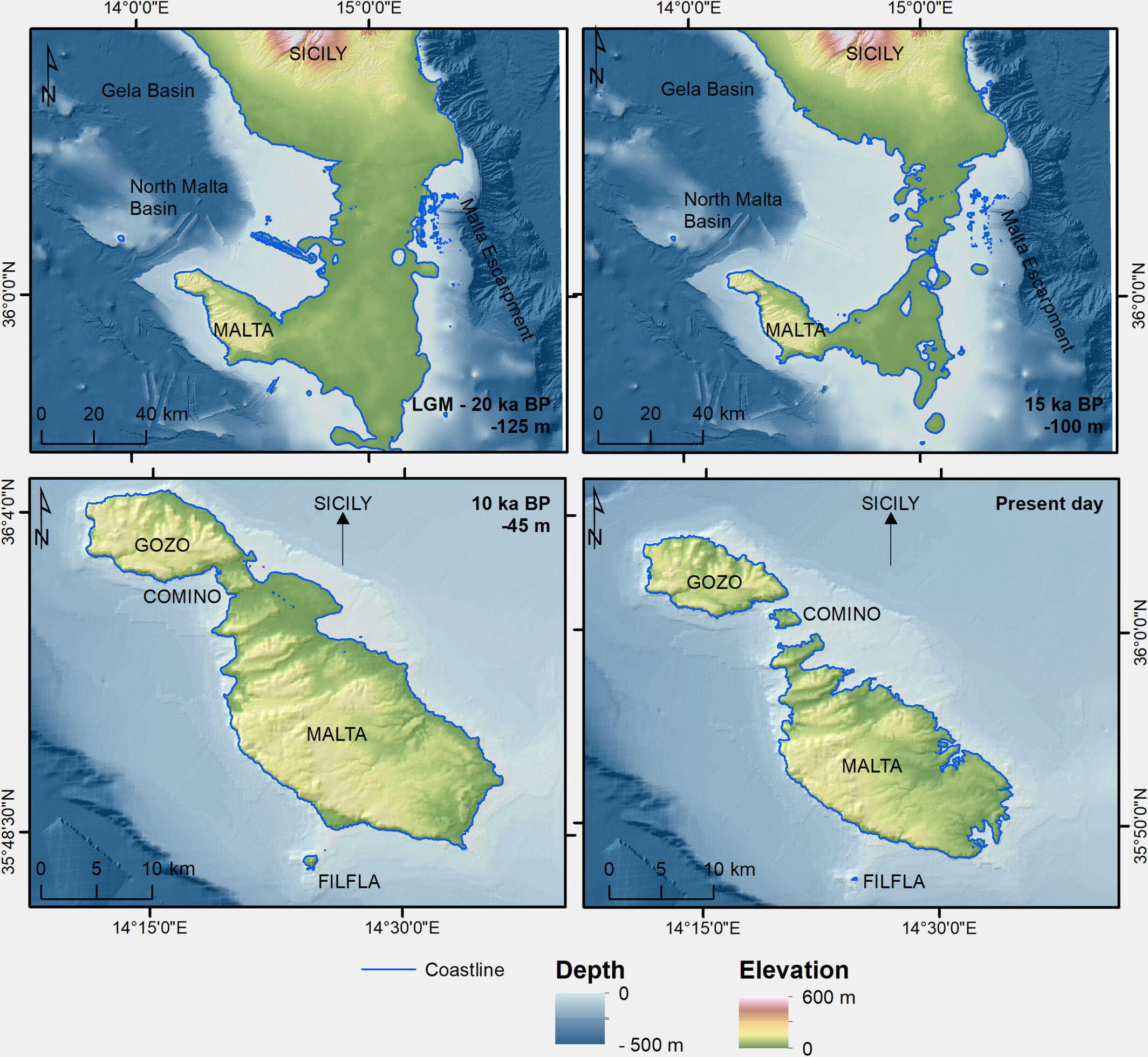
Map showing the disintegration of the land bridge between Malta and Sicily from its peak during the Last Glacial Maximum around 20,000 years ago and the reduction of land area in present day Malta compared to 10,000 years ago.

Some caverns in Malta containing sediments of Pleistocene age have revealed bones of dwarf elephants, and dwarf hippopotamuses, as well as other extinct animals, which are thought to have crossed over from Sicily (and ultimately from mainland Italy) due to a submarine plateau that was exposed as dry land connecting Malta and Sicily during glacial periods. Although it has been claimed that Neanderthals were present on the island, because molar teeth were found in Ghar Dalam cave exhibiting taurodonty, this feature is also found among some modern human teeth and is thus not a definitive indicator that the teeth belong to Neanderthals, and the context of the finds is unclear, so this claim is not widely accepted. ^{Supplementary material}

== Mesolithic (6500–5400 BC) ==
Malta has been inhabited from at least circa 6500 BC, with the arrival of Mesolithic hunter-gatherers likely originating from Sicily. Discoveries at Latnija Cave led by the Maltese archaeologist Eleanor Scerri included the remains of hearths, stone tools and an abundant and diverse range of animal bones. These included indigenous red deer that are now extinct, fish and marine mammals, as well as abundant edible marine gastropods such as limpets. To arrive on Malta, these hunter-gatherers had to cross around 100 km of open water, likely using dugout canoes, documenting the longest yet-known sea crossing by hunter-gatherers in the Mediterranean. The extinction of the dwarf hippos, giant swans and dwarf elephants has historically been linked to the earliest arrival of humans on Malta. However this seems unlikely since recent work suggests these animals went extinct many thousands of years before the arrival of the first people, and no such animals were found in association with the earliest known Mesolithic hunter-gatherers.

== Neolithic (5400 BC–2350 BC) ==
Neolithic Farmers from Sicily arrived on Malta by around 5400 BC, replacing the pre-existing hunter-gatherer population, bringing domesticated animals like goats, cattle, sheep and pigs, as well as cereal crops like club wheat, barley, emmer and lentils.

They were mainly farming and fishing communities, with some evidence of hunting activities. They apparently lived in caves and open dwellings. During the centuries that followed there is evidence of further contacts with other cultures, which left their influence on the local communities, evidenced by their pottery designs and colours. The farming methods degraded the soil; at the same time prolonged drought set in, and the islands became too dry to sustain agricultural practices. This occurred partly due to climate change and drought, and the islands were uninhabited for about a millennium.

Research carried out as part of the FRAGSUS project, comprising analysis of soil cores from valleys, which contained ancient pollen and animal evidence from past environments, revealed that "climate change fluctuations made Malta uninhabitable in some periods of prehistory. There was a substantial break of around 1,000 years between the first settlers and the next group who settled permanently on the Maltese islands and eventually built the megalithic temples."

=== Temple period (3850 BC–2350 BC) ===
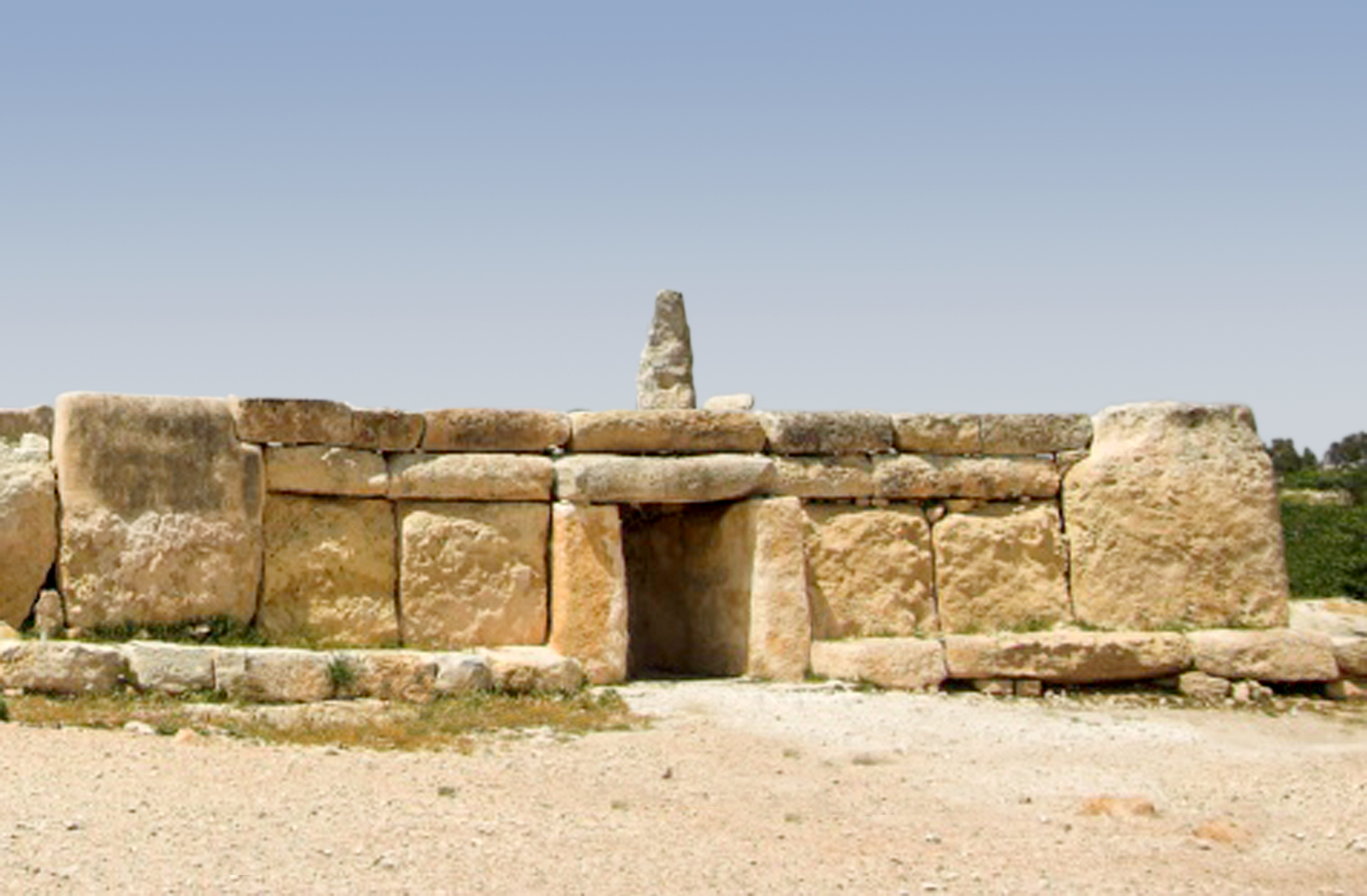
The megalithic temple of Ħaġar Qim

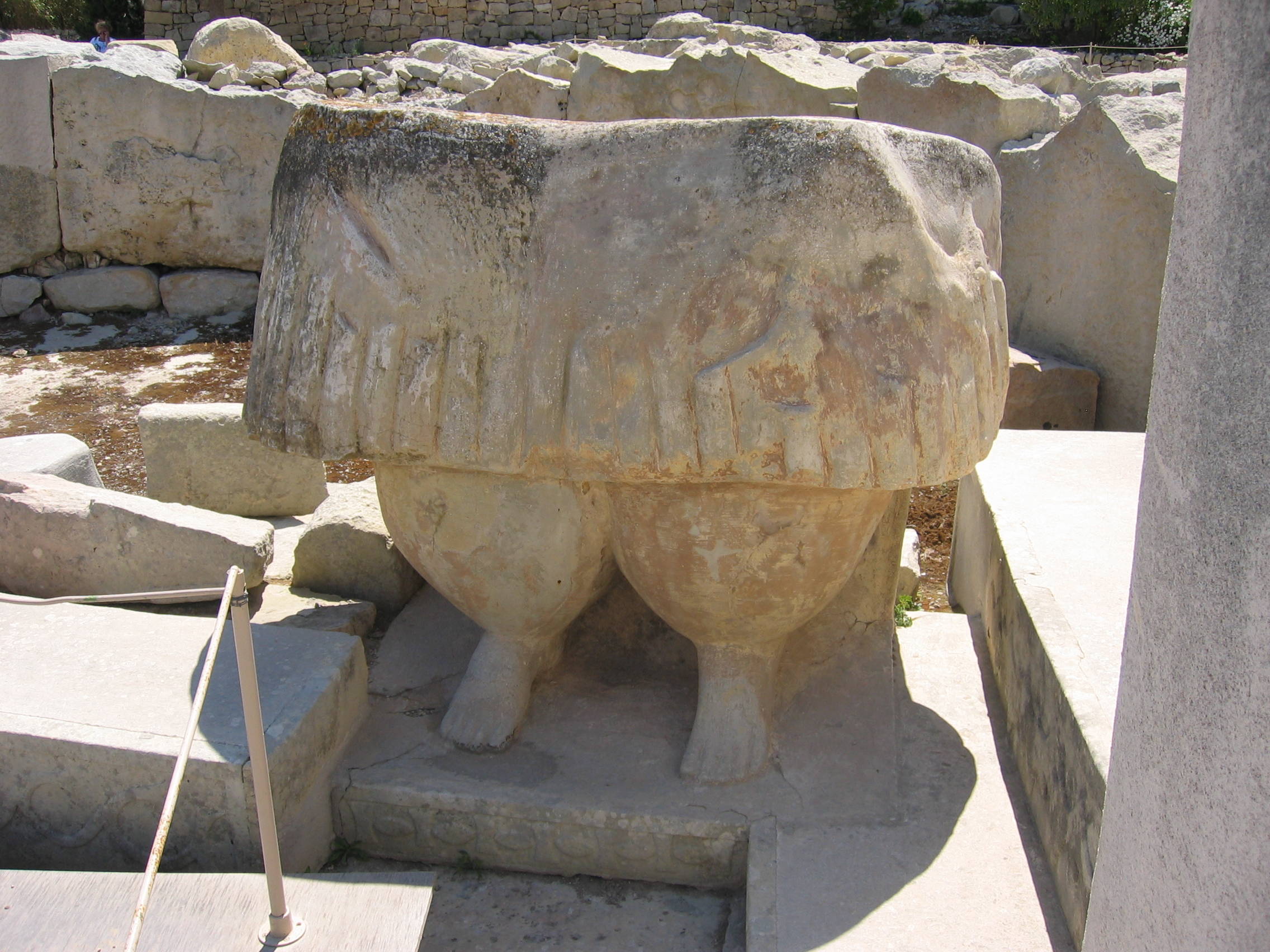
One of the so-called "fat ladies" of ancient Malta, at the Tarxien Temples

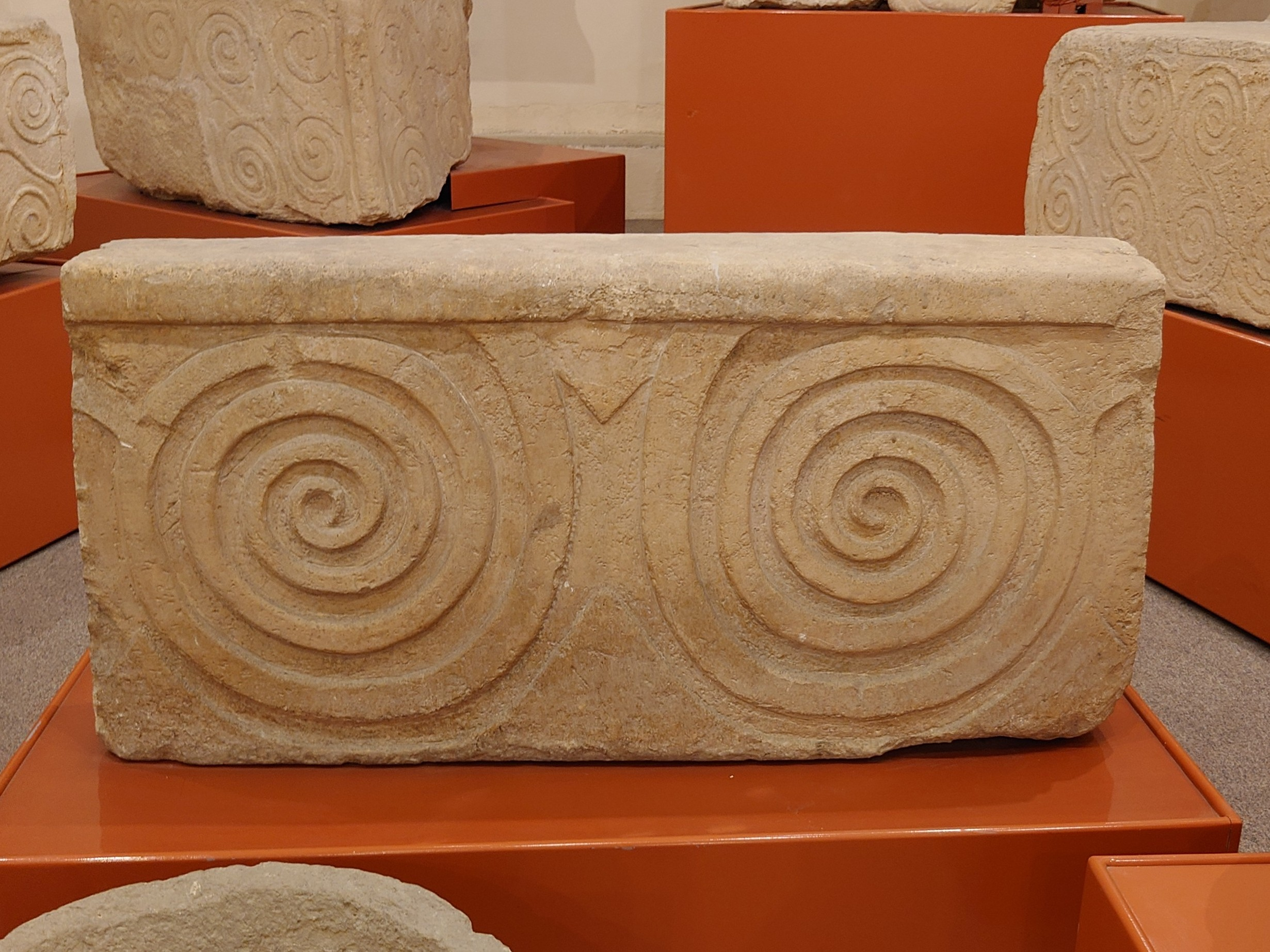
Spiral motif from one of the megalithic temples, now at the National Museum of Archaeology

A second wave of colonization arrived from Sicily in around 3850 BC. Archaeologist Caroline Malone has said: "Given the restricted land space of Malta, it is remarkable that the second colonisation survived for 1,500 years. This sort of settlement stability is unheard of in Europe and is impressive in terms of how they were able to live on an ever-degrading land for such a period of time."

One of the most notable periods of Malta's history is the temple period, starting around 3600 BC. The Ġgantija Temple in Gozo is one of the oldest free-standing buildings in the world. The name of the complex stems from the Maltese word ġgant, which reflects the magnitude of the temple's size. Many of the temples are in the form of five semicircular rooms connected at the centre. It has been suggested that these might have represented the head, arms, and legs of a deity, since one of the most common kinds of statue found in these temples comprises figures of fat female figures, popularly termed "fat ladies", and often considered to represent fertility.

The civilization which built the temples lasted for about 1,500 years until about 2350 BC, at which point the culture seems to have disappeared. There is speculation about what might have happened and whether they were completely wiped out or assimilated, but it is thought that the collapse occurred due to climate conditions and drought.

Malone has stated: "We can learn a lot from the mistakes made by the first Maltese. The lack of water, coupled with the destruction of soil that takes centuries to form, can cause the failure of a civilisation. The second group of inhabitants to Malta in 3850–2350 BC managed their resources adequately and harnessed soil and food for over 1,500 years. It was only when climate conditions and drought became so extreme that they failed."

Between 2600 and 2400 BC, half of those who died were children.

== Bronze Age (2350 BC–700 BC) ==
After the Temple period came the Bronze Age. From this period there are remains of a number of settlements and villages, as well as dolmens — altar-like structures made out of very large slabs of stone. They are claimed to belong to a population certainly different from that which built the previous megalithic temples.

It is presumed the population arrived from Sicily because of the similarity to the constructions found in the largest island of the Mediterranean sea.

One surviving menhir, which was used to build temples, still stands at Kirkop; it is one of the few still in good condition.

Among the most interesting and mysterious remnants of this era are the so-called cart ruts as they can be seen at a place on Malta called Misraħ Għar il-Kbir (informally known as Clapham Junction). These are pairs of parallel channels cut into the surface of the rock, and extending for considerable distances, often in an exactly straight line. Their exact use is unknown. One suggestion is that beasts of burden used to pull carts along, and these channels would guide the carts and prevent the animals from straying. The society that built these structures eventually died out or at any rate disappeared.

Between 1400 BC and 1200 BC there was a Mycenaean influence on the Malta, which is evidenced by presence of Mycenaean artefacts.

== Antiquity ==
=== Phoenicians and Carthage ===
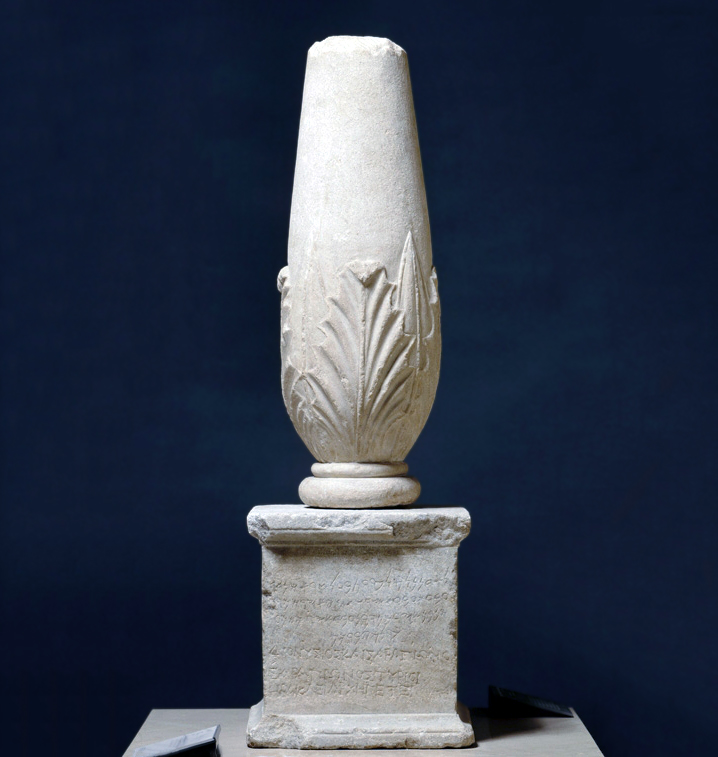
One of the Cippi of Melqart which were discovered in Malta

Phoenicians—possibly from Tyre—began to colonize the islands around the early 8th century BC, using it as an outpost from which they expanded sea exploration and trade in the Mediterranean. They called the principal island Ann (Phoenician: 𐤀𐤍𐤍, ʾnn). Necropolises have been found at Rabat on Malta and Rabat on Gozo, suggesting the main settlements were at present-day Mdina on Malta and Cittadella on Gozo. The former settlement was also known as Ann, suggesting it served as the colony's seat of government. The principal port, meanwhile, was at Cospicua on the Grand Harbor. Known simply as Maleth (𐤌𐤋𐤈, mlṭ, "The Port"), it was probably the namesake of the Greeks' and Romans' names for the entire island.

The Maltese Islands fell under the hegemony of Carthage around the middle of 6th century BC, along with most other Phoenician colonies in the western Mediterranean. By the late 4th century BC, Malta had become a trading post linking southern Italy and Sicily to Tripolitania. This resulted in the introduction of Hellenistic features in architecture and pottery. It is not known if Malta was settled like a traditional Greek apoikia, so some support that Malta was never a Greek colony. Hellenistic architectural features can be seen in the Punic temple at Tas-Silġ and a tower in Żurrieq. The Greek language also began to be used in Malta, as shown in the bilingual Phoenician and Greek inscriptions found on the Cippi of Melqart. In the 18th century, French scholar Jean-Jacques Barthélemy deciphered the extinct Phoenician alphabet using the inscriptions on these cippi.

In 255 BC, the Romans raided Malta during the First Punic War, devastating much of the island.

=== Roman rule ===
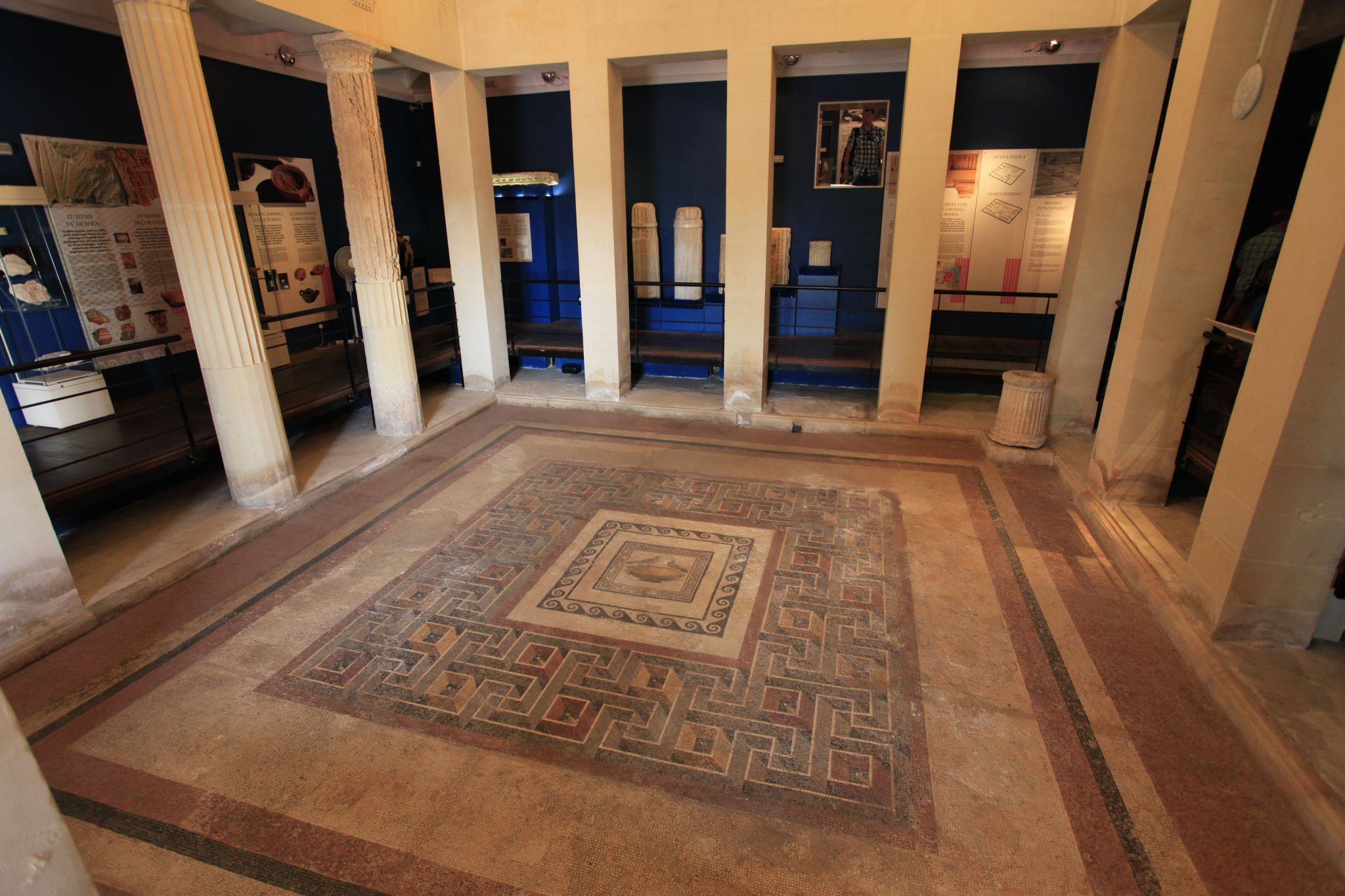
Roman mosaics in the Domvs Romana of ancient Melite

According to Latin historian Livy, the Maltese Islands passed into the hands of the Romans at the start of the Second Punic War in the year 218 BC. Livy reports the commander of the Punic garrison on the Island surrendered without resistance to Tiberius Sempronius Longus, one of the two consuls for that year, who was on his way to North Africa. The archipelago—known to the Romans as Melita or Melite—became part of the province of Sicily, but by the 1st century it had its own local senate and people's assembly. By this time, both Malta and Gozo minted distinctive coins based on Roman weight measurements.

Serving as the administrative hub of the islands, Mdina also became known as Melita. Its size grew to its maximum extent, occupying the entire area of present-day Mdina and large parts of Rabat, extending to what is now St Paul's Church. Remains show that the city was surrounded by thick defensive walls and was also protected by a protective ditch that ran along the same line of St Rita Street, which was built directly above it. Remains hint that a religious centre with a number of temples was built on the highest part of the promontory. The remains of one impressive residence known as the Domus Romana have been excavated, revealing well-preserved Pompeian style mosaics. This domus seems to have been the residence of a rich Roman aristocrat, and it is believed to have been built in the 1st century BC and abandoned in the 2nd century AD.

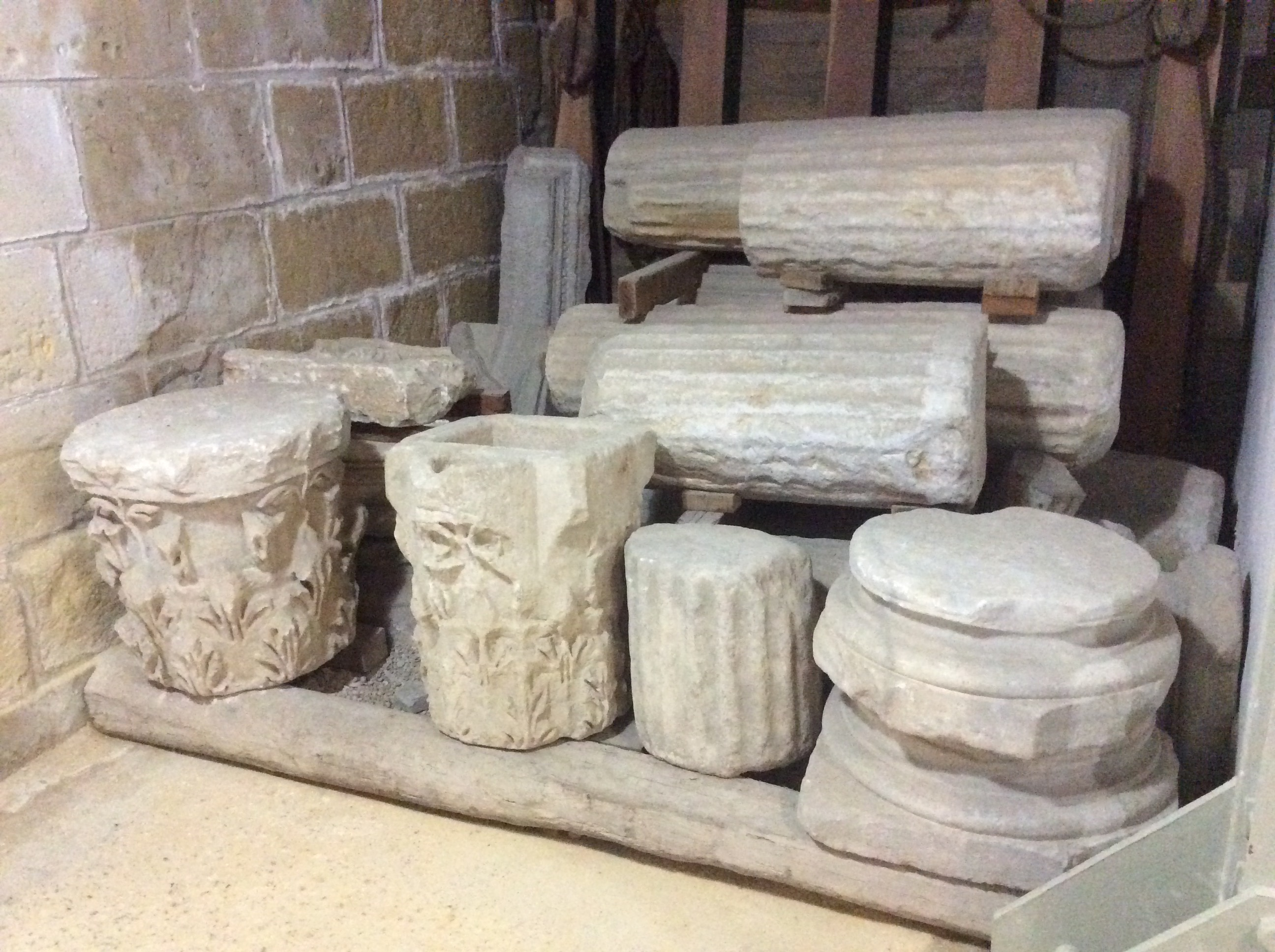
Greek-Roman remains at the Malta Maritime Museum

The islands prospered under Roman rule, and were eventually distinguished as a Municipium and a Foederata Civitas. Many Roman antiquities still exist, testifying to the close link between the Maltese inhabitants and Sicily. Throughout the period of Roman rule, Latin became Malta's official language, and Roman religion was introduced in the islands. Despite this, the local Punic-Hellenistic culture and language is thought to have survived until at least the 1st century AD.

In AD 60, the Acts of the Apostles records that Saint Paul was shipwrecked on an island named Melite, which many Bible scholars and Maltese conflate with Malta; there is a tradition that the shipwreck took place on the shores of the aptly named "St. Paul's Bay". In Acts 28, Saint Paul is welcomed by the islanders who build him a fire. As Paul is gathering wood for the fire, a poisonous viper in the wood is driven out by the heat and bites Paul. Paul is unaffected by the bite, leading the people of Malta to believe he is a god. This assumption allows Paul the opportunity to introduce the Gospel to the island.

Malta remained part of the Roman Empire until the early 6th century. The Vandals and later the Ostrogoths might have briefly occupied the islands in the 5th century, but there is no archaeological evidence to support this.

== Middle Ages ==
=== Byzantine rule ===
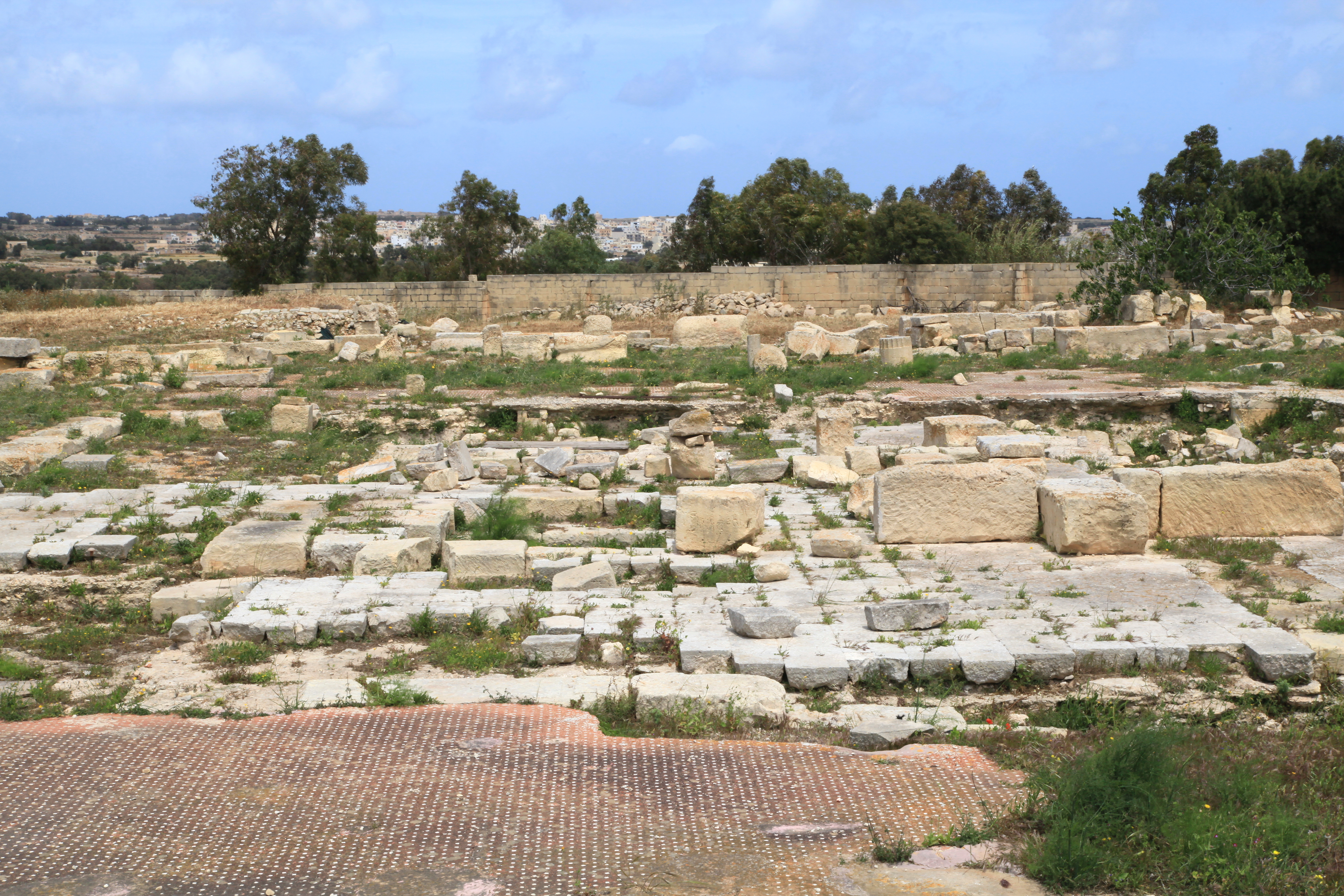
Remains of a Byzantine basilica at Tas-Silġ, which was built on the site of earlier megalithic and Punic-Roman temples

In 533, Byzantine general Belisarius may have landed at Malta while on his way from Sicily to North Africa, and by 535, the islands were integrated into the Byzantine province of Sicily. During the Byzantine period, the main settlements remained the city of Melite on mainland Malta and the Citadel on Gozo, while Marsaxlokk, Marsaskala, Marsa and Xlendi are believed to have served as harbours. The relatively high quantity of Byzantine ceramics found in Malta suggests that the island might have had an important strategic role within the empire from the 6th to 8th centuries.

From the late 7th century onward, the Mediterranean was being threatened by Muslim expansion. At this point, the Byzantines probably improved the defences of Malta, as can be seen by defensive walls built around the basilica at Tas-Silġ around the 8th century. The Byzantines might have also built the retrenchment which reduced Melite to one-third of its original size.

=== Arab period ===
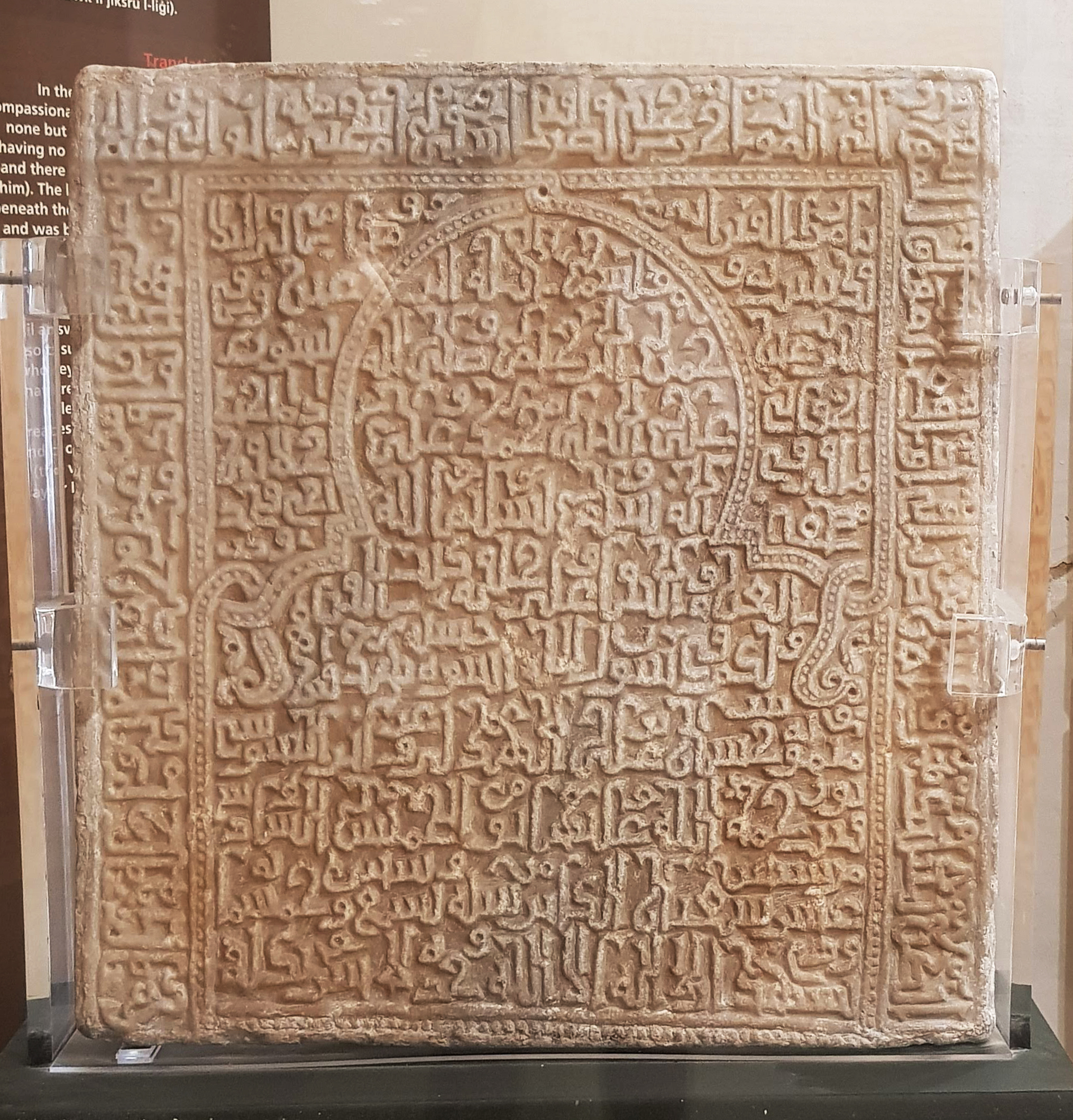
The Maymūnah Stone, a 12th-century marble tombstone believed to have been found in Gozo

In 870 AD, Malta was occupied by Muslims from North Africa. According to Al-Himyarī, Aghlabids led by Halaf al-Hādim besieged the Byzantine city of Melite, which was ruled by governor Amros (probably Ambrosios). Al-Hādim was killed in the fighting, and Sawāda Ibn Muḥammad was sent from Sicily to continue the siege following his death. The duration of the siege is unknown, but it probably lasted for some weeks or months. After Melite fell to the invaders, the inhabitants were massacred, the city was destroyed and its churches were looted. Marble from Melite's churches was used to build the castle of Sousse. According to Al-Himyarī, Malta remained almost uninhabited until it was resettled in around 1048 or 1049 by a Muslim community and their slaves, who rebuilt the city of Melite as Medina, making it "a finer place than it was before". However, archaeological evidence suggests that Melite/Medina was already a thriving Muslim settlement by the beginning of the 11th century, so Al-Himyarī's account might be unreliable. In 1053–54, the Byzantines besieged Medina but they were repelled by its defenders. Although their rule was relatively short, the Arabs left a significant impact on Malta. In addition to their language, Siculo-Arabic, cotton, oranges and lemons and many new techniques in irrigation were introduced. Some of these, like the noria (waterwheel), are still used, unchanged, today. Many place names in Malta date to this period.

A long historiographic controversy loomed over Medieval Muslim Malta. According to the "Christian continuity thesis", spearheaded by Giovanni Francesco Abela and still most present in popular narratives, the Maltese population continuously inhabited the islands from the early Christian Era up to today, and a Christian community persisted even during Muslim times. This was contested in the 1970s by the medieval historian Godfrey Wettinger, who claimed that nothing indicated the continuity of Christianity from the late 9th to the 11th century on the Maltese Islands – the Maltese must have integrated into the new Arab Islamic society. The Christian continuity thesis had a revival in 2010 following the publication of Tristia ex Melitogaudo by Stanley Fiorini, Horatio Vella and Joseph Brincat, who challenged Wettinger's interpretation based on a line of a Byzantine poem (which later appeared to have been mistranslated). Wettinger subsequently reaffirmed his thesis, based on sources from the Arab historians and geographers Al Baqri, Al-Himyarī, Ibn Hauqal, Qazwini, who all seemed to be in agreement that "the island of Malta remained after that a ruin without inhabitants" – thus ruling out any continuity whatsoever between the Maltese prior to 870 and after. This is also consistent with Joseph Brincat’s finding of no further substrata beyond Arabic in the Maltese language, a very rare occurrence which may only be explained by a drastic lapse between one period and the following. To the contrary, the few Byzantine words in Maltese language can be traced to the 400 Rhodians coming with the knights in 1530, as well as to the influx of Greek rite Christians from Sicily.

=== Norman Kingdom of Sicily rule ===
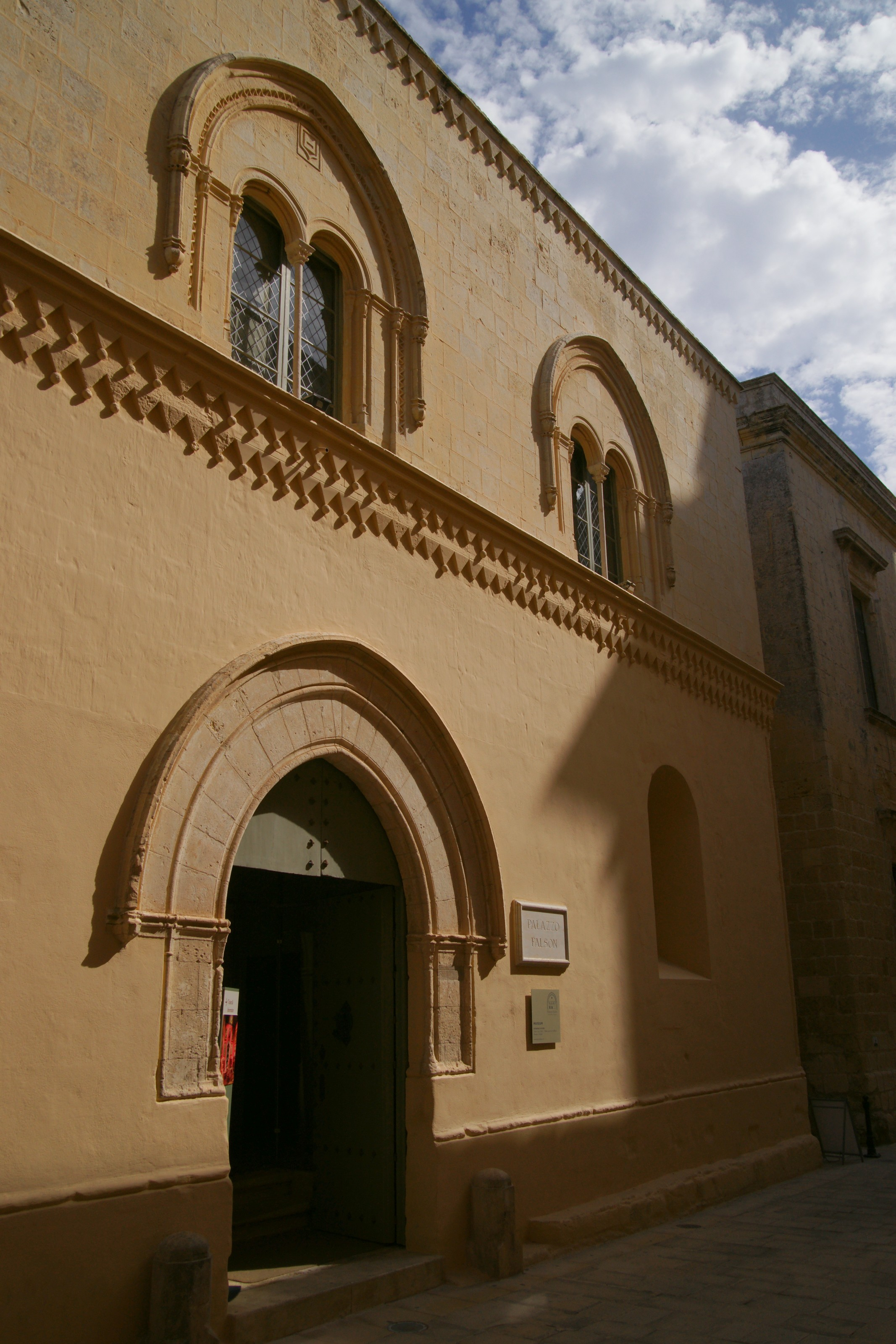
Palazzo Falzon, which was built between the late 15th and mid 16th centuries. It is the second oldest surviving building in Mdina.

Malta returned to Christian rule with the Norman conquest. It was, with Noto on the southern tip of Sicily, the last Arab stronghold in the region to be retaken by the resurgent Christians. In 1091, Count Roger I of Sicily, invaded Malta and turned the island's Muslim rulers into his vassals. In 1127, his son Roger II of Sicily fully established Norman rule in Malta, paving the way for the islands' Christianization.

Malta was part of the Kingdom of Sicily for nearly 440 years. During this period, Malta was sold and resold to various feudal lords and barons and was dominated successively by the rulers of Swabia, Anjou, the Crown of Aragon, the Crown of Castile and Spain. Eventually, the Crown of Aragon, which then ruled Malta, joined with Castile in 1469, and Malta became part of the Spanish Empire. Meanwhile, Malta's administration fell in the hands of local nobility who formed a governing body called the Università.

The islands remained largely Muslim-inhabited long after the end of Arab rule. The Arab administration was also kept in place and Muslims were allowed to practise their religion freely until the 13th century. Muslims continued to demographically and economically dominate Malta for at least another 150 years after the Norman conquest. (Note: "Of greater cultural significance, the demographic and economic dominance of Muslims continued for at least another century and a half after which forced conversions undoubtedly permitted many former Muslims to remain.")

In 1122, Malta experienced a Muslim uprising and in 1127 Roger II of Sicily reconquered the islands.

Even in 1175, Burchard, bishop of Strasbourg, an envoy of Frederick I, Holy Roman Emperor, had the impression, based upon his brief visit to Malta, that it was exclusively or mainly inhabited by Muslims.

In 1192, Tancred of Sicily appointed Margaritus of Brindisi the first Count of Malta, perhaps for his unexpected success in capturing Empress Constance contender to the throne. Between 1194 and 1530, the Kingdom of Sicily ruled the Maltese islands and a process of gradual Italianization and Christianization started in Malta.

In 1224, Frederick II, Holy Roman Emperor, sent an expedition against Malta to establish royal control and prevent its Muslim population from helping a Muslim rebellion in the Kingdom of Sicily.

After the Norman conquest, the population of the Maltese islands kept growing mainly through immigration from the north (Sicily and Italy), with the exile to Malta of the entire male population of the town of Celano (Italy) in 1223, the stationing of a Norman and Sicilian garrison on Malta in 1240 and the settlement in Malta of noble families from Sicily between 1372 and 1450. As a consequence of this, Capelli et al. found in 2005 that "the contemporary males of Malta most likely originated from Southern Italy, including Sicily and up to Calabria."

According to a report in 1240 or 1241 by Gililberto Abbate, who was the royal governor of Frederick II of Sicily during the Genoese Period of the County of Malta, in that year the islands of Malta and Gozo had 836 Muslim families, 250 Christian families and 33 Jewish families.

Around 1249, some Maltese Muslims were sent to the Italian colony of Lucera, established for Sicilian Muslims. (Note: "The establishment of an Italian colony for Sicilian Muslims at Lucera on the Italian Peninsula beginning in 1223 has led to much speculation that there must have been a general expulsion of all Muslims from Malta in 1224. However, it is virtually impossible to reconcile this viewpoint with a report of 1240 or 1241 by Gilibert to Frederick II of Sicily to the effect that in that year Malta and Gozo had 836 families that were Saracen or Muslim, 250 that were Christian, and 33 that were Jewish. Moreover, Ibn Khaldun is on record as stating that some Maltese Muslims were sent to the Italian colony of Lucera around 1249.) For some historians, including Godfrey Wettinger, who follow on this Ibn Khaldun, this event marked the end of Islam in Malta. According to Wettinger, "there is no doubt that by the beginning of Angevin times [i.e. shortly after 1249] no professed Muslim Maltese remained either as free persons or even as serfs on the island." (Note: "Ibn Khaldun puts the expulsion of Islam from the Maltese Islands to the year 1249. It is not clear what actually happened then, except that the Maltese language, derived from Arabic, certainly survived. Either the number of Christians was far larger than Giliberto had indicated, and they themselves already spoke Maltese, or a large proportion of the Muslims themselves accepted baptism and stayed behind. Henri Bresc has written that there are indications of further Muslim political activity on Malta during the last Suabian years. Anyhow there is no doubt that by the beginning of Angevin times no professed Muslim Maltese remained either as free persons or even as serfs on the island.") The Maltese language nevertheless survived – an indication that either a large number of Christians already spoke Maltese, or that many Muslims converted and remained behind.

In 1266, Malta was turned over in fiefdom to Charles of Anjou, brother of France's King Louis IX, who retained it in ownership until 1283. Eventually, during Charles's rule religious coexistence became precarious in Malta, since he had a genuine intolerance of religions other than Roman Catholicism. However, Malta's links with Africa would still remain strong until the beginning of Aragonese and Spanish rule in 1283, following the War of the Sicilian Vespers.

In September 1429, Hafsid Saracens attempted to capture Malta but were repelled by the Maltese. The invaders pillaged the countryside and took about 3,000 inhabitants as slaves.

By the end of the 15th century, all Maltese Muslims would be forced to convert to Christianity and had to find ways to disguise their previous identities by Latinizing or adopting new surnames. (Note: "Though by the end of the fifteenth century all Maltese Muslims would be forced to convert to Christianity, they would still be in the process of acquiring surnames as required in European tradition. Ingeniously, they often used their father's personal Arabic names as the basis of surnames, though there was a consistent cultural avoidance of extremely obvious Arabic and Muslim names, such as Muhammed and Razul. Also, many families disguised their Arabic names, such as Karwan (the city in Tunisia), which became Caruana, and some derived family names by translating from Arabic into a Roman form, such as Magro or Magri from Dejf.")

== Hospitaller rule (1530–1798) ==
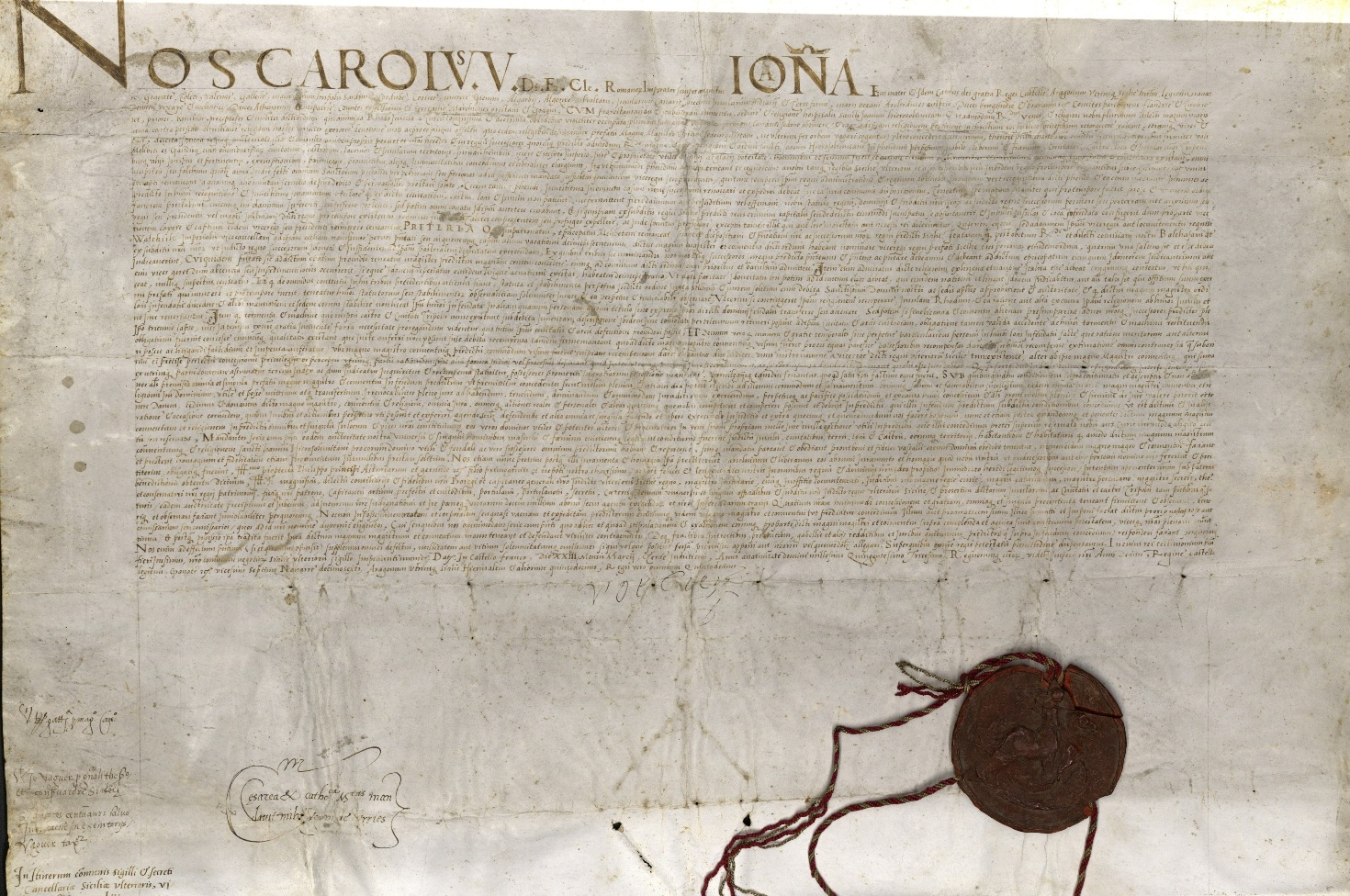
Deed of Donation of the islands of Malta, Gozo and Tripoli to the Order of St. John by Emperor Charles V in 1530.

Malta was ruled by the Order of Saint John as a vassal state of the Kingdom of Sicily from 1530 to 1798.

=== Early years ===
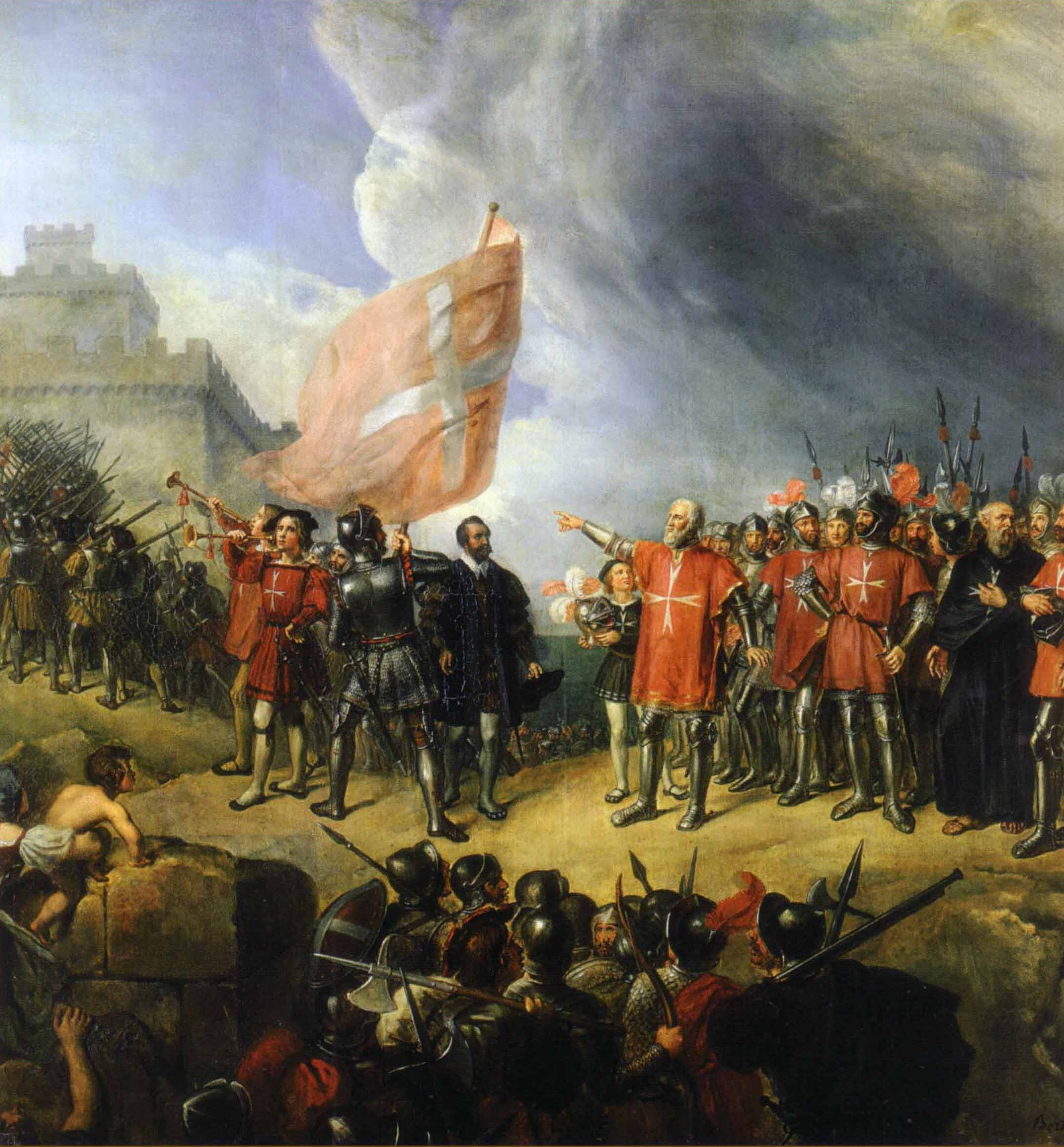
Philippe Villiers de L'Isle-Adam takes possession of the island of Malta, 26 October 1530 by René Théodore Berthon

In the early 16th century, the Ottoman Empire started spreading over the region, reaching South East Europe. The Spanish king Charles V feared that if Rome fell to the Turks, it would be the end of Christian Europe. In 1522, Suleiman I drove the Knights Hospitaller of St. John out of Rhodes. They dispersed to their commanderies in Europe. Wanting to protect Rome from invasion from the south, in 1530, Charles V handed over the island to these knights.

For the next 268 years, the "Knights of Malta" made the island their domain and made the Italian language official. They built towns, palaces, churches, gardens, and fortifications, they embellished the island with numerous works of art, and enhanced cultural heritage.

The order of the Knights of St. John was originally established to set up outposts along the route to the Holy Land, to assist pilgrims going in either direction. Owing to the many confrontations that took place, one of their main tasks was to provide medical assistance, and even today the eight-pointed cross is still in wide use in ambulances and first aid organisations. In return for the many lives they saved, the Order received many newly conquered territories that had to be defended. Together with the need to defend the pilgrims in their care, this gave rise to the strong military wing of the knights. Over time, the Order became strong and rich. From hospitallers first and military second, these priorities reversed. Since much of the territory they covered was around the Mediterranean region, they became notable seamen.

From Malta the knights resumed their seaborne attacks of Ottoman shipping, and before long the Sultan Suleyman the Magnificent ordered a final attack on the Order. By this time the Knights had occupied the city of Birgu, which had excellent harbours to house their fleet. Birgu was one of the two major urban places at that time, the other most urban place being Mdina the old capital city of Malta. The defences around Birgu were enhanced and new fortifications built on the other point where now there is Senglea. A small fort was built at the tip of the peninsula where the city of Valletta now stands and was named Fort Saint Elmo.

=== Great Siege ===
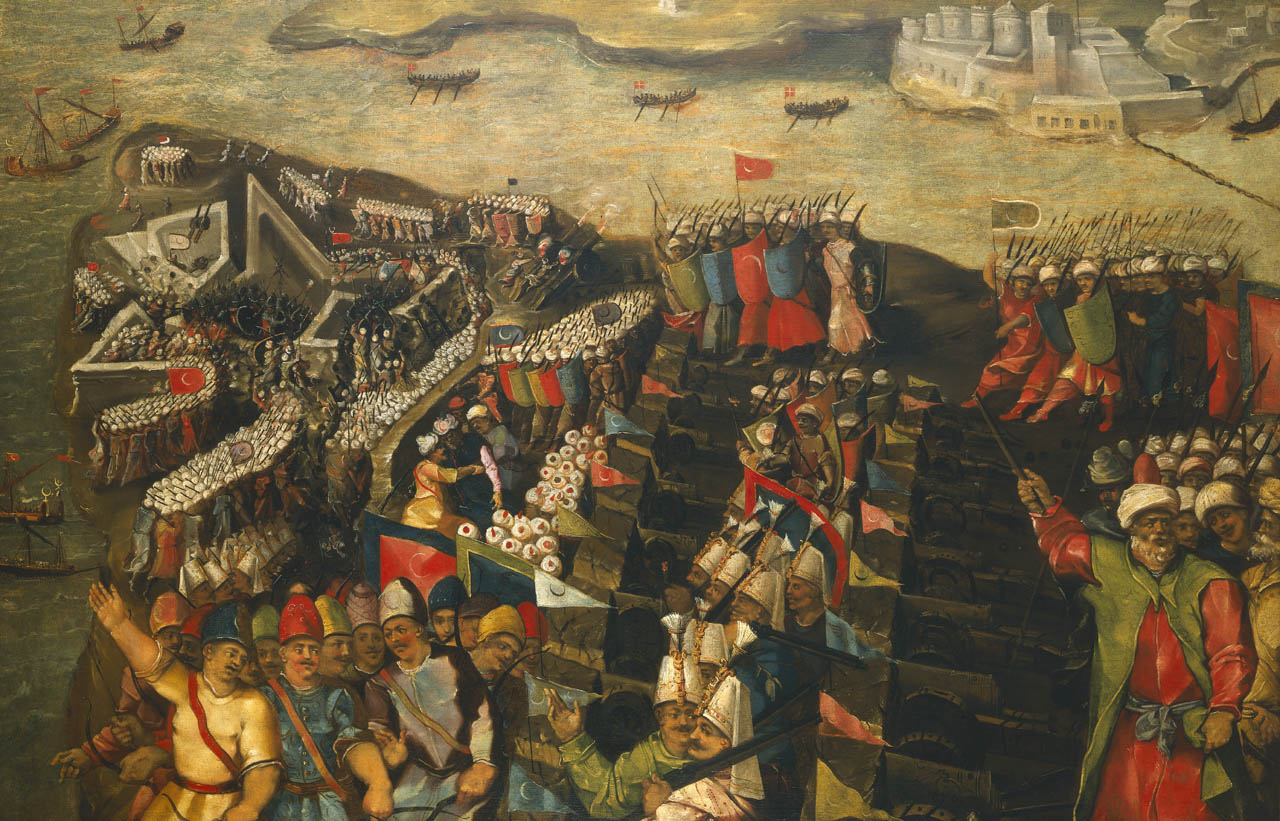
Capture of St. Elmo, 1565

On 18 May 1565, Suleiman the Magnificent laid siege to Malta. By the time the Ottoman fleet arrived the Knights were as ready as they could be. First, the Ottomans attacked the newly built fort of St. Elmo and after a whole month of fighting the fort was in rubble and the soldiers kept fighting until they were wiped out. After this the Turks started attacking Birgu and the fortifications at Senglea but to no gain.

After a protracted siege ended on 8 September of the same year, which became known in history as Great Siege of Malta, the Ottoman Empire conceded defeat as the approaching winter storms threatened to prevent them from leaving. The Ottoman Empire had expected an easy victory within weeks. They had 40,000 men arrayed against the Knights' 9,000, most of them Maltese soldiers and simple citizens bearing arms. Their loss of thousands of men was very demoralising. The Ottomans made no further attempts to conquer Malta and the Sultan died in the next year.

=== After the siege ===
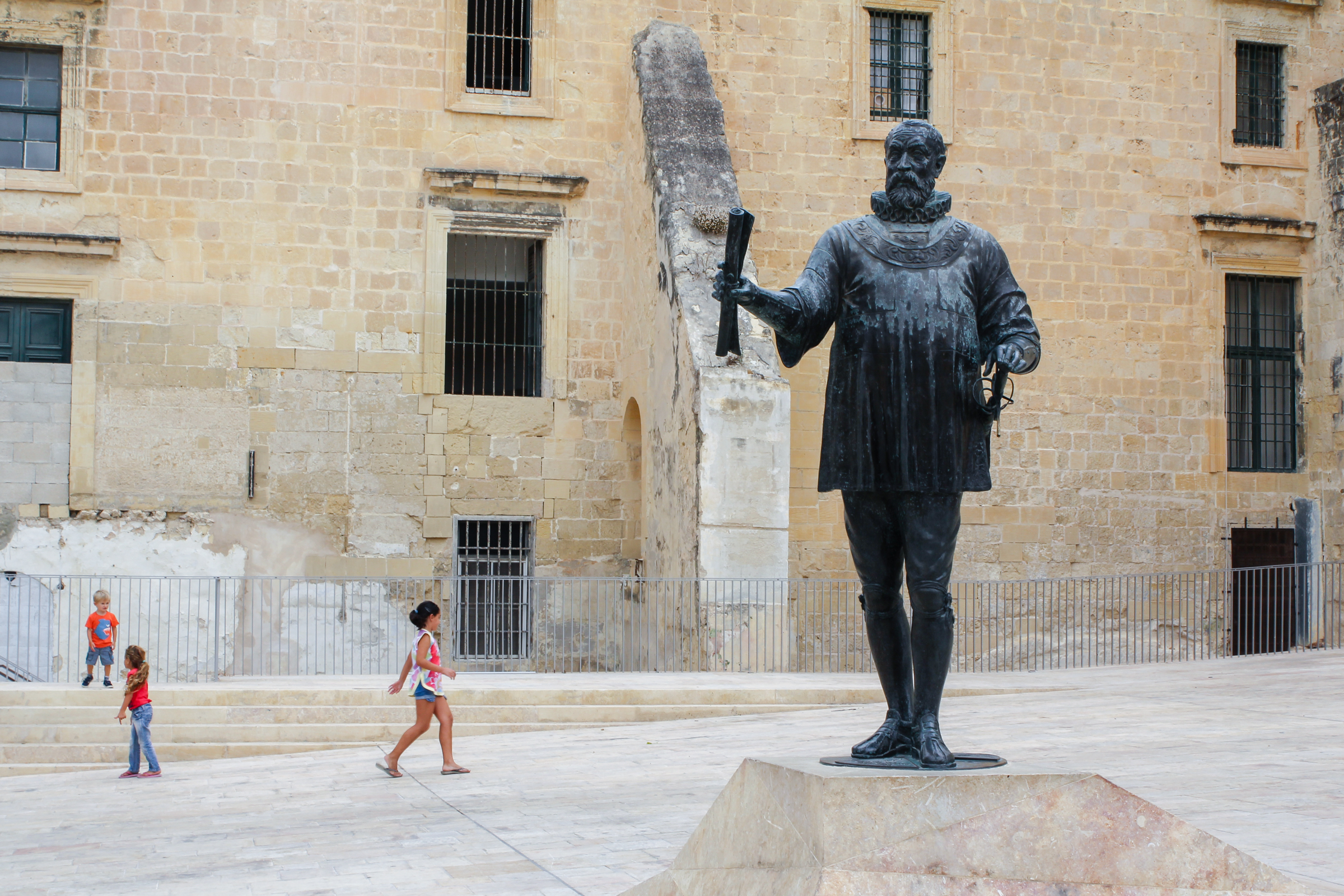
Memorial for Jean Parisot de Valette in Valletta

The year after, the Order started work on a new city with fortifications like no other, on the Sciberras Peninsula which the Ottomans had used as a base during the siege. It was named Valletta after Jean Parisot de Valette, the Grand Master who had seen the Order through its victory. Since the Ottoman Empire never attacked again, the fortifications were never put to the test, and today remain one of the best-preserved fortifications of this period.

Unlike other rulers of the island, the Order of St. John did not have a "home country" outside the island. The island became their home, so they invested in it more heavily than any other power. Besides, its members came from noble families, and the Order had amassed considerable fortunes due to its services to those en route to the Holy Land. The architectural and artistic remains of this period remain among the greatest of Malta's history, especially in their "prize jewel" — the city of Valletta.

However, as their main raison d'être had ceased to exist, the Order's glory days were over. In the last three decades of the eighteenth century, the Order experienced a steady decline. This was a result of a number of factors, including the bankruptcy that was a result of some lavish rule of the last Grand Masters, which drained the finances of the Order. Due to this, the Order also became unpopular with the Maltese.

Indeed, in 1775, a revolt known as the Rising of the Priests occurred. Rebels managed to capture Fort St Elmo and Saint James Cavalier, but the revolt was suppressed and some of the leaders were executed while others were imprisoned or exiled.

== French occupation (1798–1800) ==
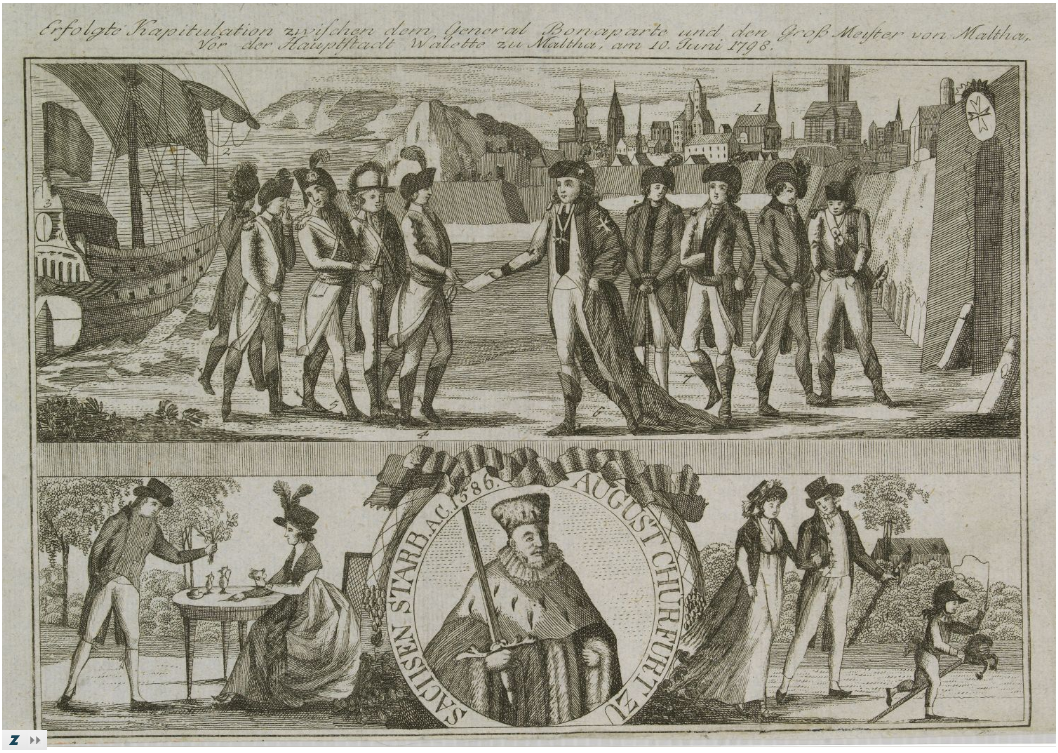
Capitulation of Malta to Napoleon, 1798

Over the years, the power of the knights declined; their reign ended in 1798 when Napoleon Bonaparte's expeditionary fleet stopped off there en route to his Egyptian expedition. Napoleon asked for safe harbour to resupply his ships, and when they refused to supply him with water, Napoleon Bonaparte sent a division to scale the hills of Valletta. Grand Master Hompesch capitulated on 11 June. The following day a treaty was signed by which the order handed over sovereignty of the island of Malta to the French Republic. In return the French Republic agreed to "employ all its credit at the congress of Rastatt to procure a principality for the Grand Master, equivalent to the one he gives up".

During his very short stay (six days), Napoleon accomplished quite a number of reforms, notably the creation of a new administration with a Government Commission, the creation of twelve municipalities, the setting up of a public finance administration, the abolition of all feudal rights and privileges, the abolition of slavery and the granting of freedom to all Turkish slaves (2000 in all). On the judicial level, a family code was framed and twelve judges were nominated. Public education was organised along principles laid down by Bonaparte himself, providing for primary and secondary education. Fifteen primary schools were founded and the university was replaced by an ’Ecole centrale’ in which there were eight chairs, all very scientific in outlook: notably, arithmetic and stereometry, algebra and stereotomy, geometry and astronomy, mechanics and physics, navigation, chemistry, etc.

He then sailed for Egypt leaving a substantial garrison in Malta. Since the Order had also been growing unpopular with the local Maltese, the latter initially viewed the French with optimism. This illusion did not last long. Within months the French were closing convents and seizing church treasures, most notably the sword of Jean de Valette which has since been returned to Malta in 2017, after a century in Paris, and for many years exhibited at the Louvre, in Paris. The Maltese people rebelled, and the French garrison of General Claude-Henri Belgrand de Vaubois retreated into Valletta. After several failed attempts by the locals to retake Valletta, the British were asked for their assistance. Rear Admiral Lord Horatio Nelson decided on a total blockade in 1799. The French garrison surrendered in 1800.

== Malta in the British Empire (1800–1964) ==
=== British Malta in the 19th and early 20th centuries ===
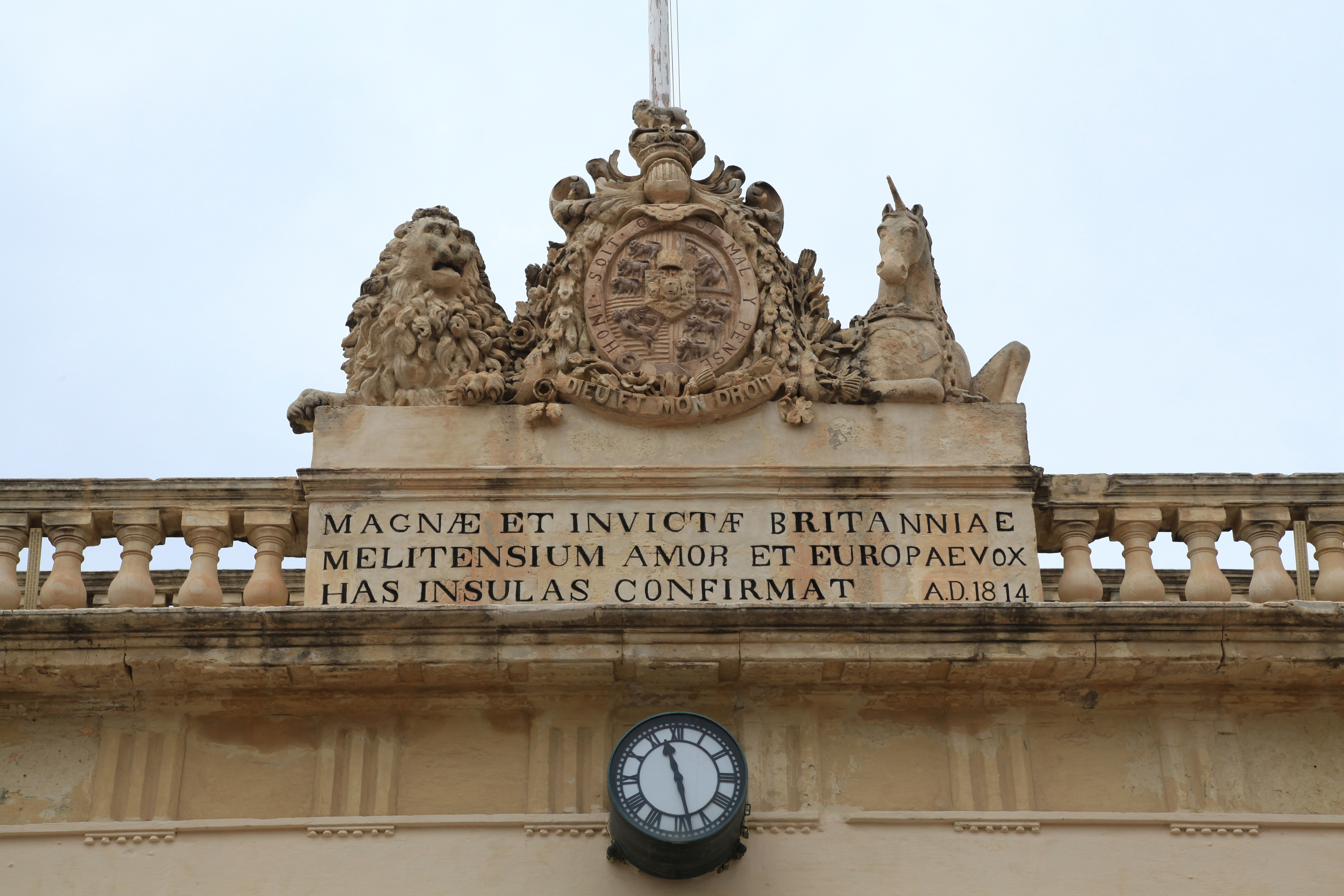
The British coat of arms on the Main Guard building in Valletta.

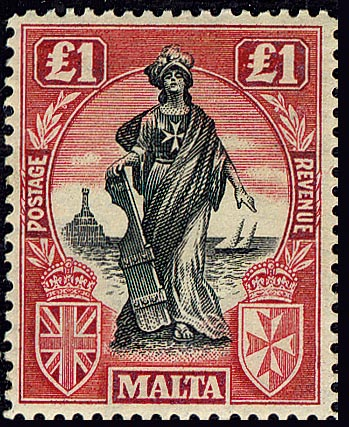
Personification of Melita on a one-pound colonial-era stamp, 1922

In 1800, Malta voluntarily became part of the British Empire as a protectorate. Under the terms of the 1802 Treaty of Amiens with France, Britain was supposed to evacuate the island, but failed to keep this obligation – one of several mutual cases of non-adherence to the treaty, which eventually led to its collapse and the resumption of war between the two countries.

Although initially the island was not given much importance, its excellent harbours became a prized asset for the British, especially after the opening of the Suez Canal in 1869. The island became a military and naval fortress, the headquarters of the British Mediterranean fleet.

Home rule was refused to the Maltese until 1921 although a partly elected legislative council was created as early as 1849 (the first Council of Government under British rule had been held in 1835), and the locals sometimes suffered considerable poverty. This was due to the island being overpopulated and largely dependent on British military expenditure which varied with the demands of war. Throughout the 19th century, the British administration instituted several liberal constitutional reforms which were generally resisted by the church and the Maltese elite who preferred to cling to their feudal privileges. Political organisations, like the Nationalist Party, were created or had as one of their aims, the protection of the Italian language in Malta.

In 1813 Malta was granted the Bathurst Constitution; in 1814 it was declared free of the plague, while the 1815 Congress of Vienna reaffirmed the British rule under the 1814 Treaty of Paris. In 1819, the local Italian-speaking Università was dissolved.

The year 1828 saw the revocation of the right of sanctuary, following the Vatican Church-State proclamation. In 1831, the See of Malta was made independent of the See of Palermo. In 1839, press censorship was abolished, and the construction of St. Paul's Anglican Cathedral began.

Following the 1846 Carnival riots, in 1849 a Council of Government with elected members under British rule was set up. In 1870 a referendum was held on ecclesiastics serving on Council of Government, and in 1881 an Executive Council under British rule was created; in 1887, the Council of Government was entrusted with "dual control" under British rule. A backlash came in 1903, with the return to the 1849 form of Council of Government under British rule.

The last quarter of the century saw technical and financial progress in line with the Belle Époque: The following years saw the foundation of the Anglo-Egyptian Bank (1882) and the beginning of operation of the Malta Railway (1883); the first definitive postage stamps were issued in 1885, and in 1904 tram service began. In 1886 Surgeon Major David Bruce discovered the microbe causing the Malta Fever, and in 1905 Themistocles Zammit discovered the fever's sources. Finally, in 1912, Dun Karm Psaila wrote his first poem in Maltese.

Between 1915 and 1918, during World War I, Malta became known as "the Nurse of the Mediterranean" due to the large number of wounded soldiers who were accommodated in Malta.

=== Interwar period ===
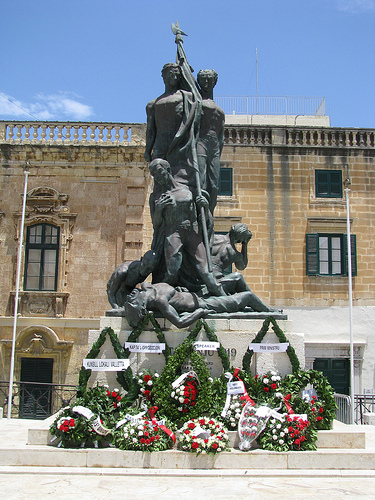
Sette Giugno monument

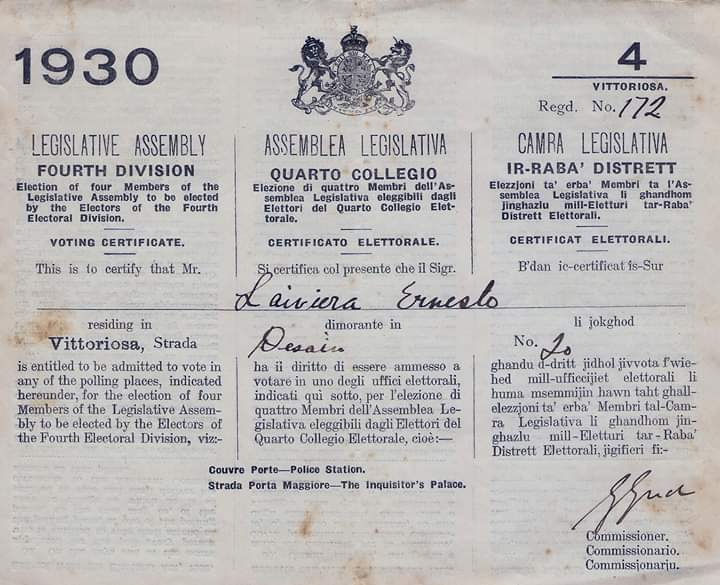
Voting document of Ernesto Laiviera for the later cancelled 1930 elections in Malta

In 1919, the Sette Giugno (7 June) riots over the excessive price of bread led to greater autonomy for the locals during the 1920s. After Filippo Sciberras had convened a National Assembly, in 1921 self-government was granted under British rule. Malta obtained a bicameral parliament with a Senate (later abolished in 1949) and an elected Legislative Assembly. Joseph Howard was named Prime Minister. In 1923 the Innu Malti was played for the first time in public, and the same year Francisco Buhagiar became Prime Minister, followed in 1924 by Sir Ugo Pasquale Mifsud and in 1927 by Sir Gerald Strickland.

The 1930s saw a period of instability in the relations between the Maltese political elite, the Maltese Catholic church, and the British authorities; the 1921 Constitution was suspended twice. First in 1930–1932, when British authorities assumed that a free and fair election would not be possible following a clash between the governing Constitutional Party and the Church and the latter's subsequent imposition of mortal sin on voters of the party and its allies, thus making a free and fair election impossible. Again, in 1933 the Constitution was withdrawn over the Government's budgetary vote for the teaching of Italian in elementary schools, after just 13 months of a Nationalist administration. Malta thus reverted to the Crown Colony status it held in 1813.

Before the arrival of the British, the official language since 1530 (that of the handful of educated elite) had been Italian, but this was downgraded by the increased use of English. In 1934 Maltese was declared an official language, which brought the number up to three. Two years later, the Letters Patent of the 1936 constitution declared that Maltese and English were the only official languages, thereby legally settling the long-standing 'Language Question' that had dominated Maltese politics for over half a century. In 1934, only about 15% of the population could speak Italian fluently. This meant that out of 58,000 males qualified by age to be jurors, only 767 could qualify by language, as only Italian had until then been used in the courts.

In 1936 the Constitution was revised to provide for the nomination of members to Executive Council under British rule (similar to the 1835 constitution) and in 1939 to provide again for a partly elected Council of Government under British rule.

=== British Malta during the Second World War ===
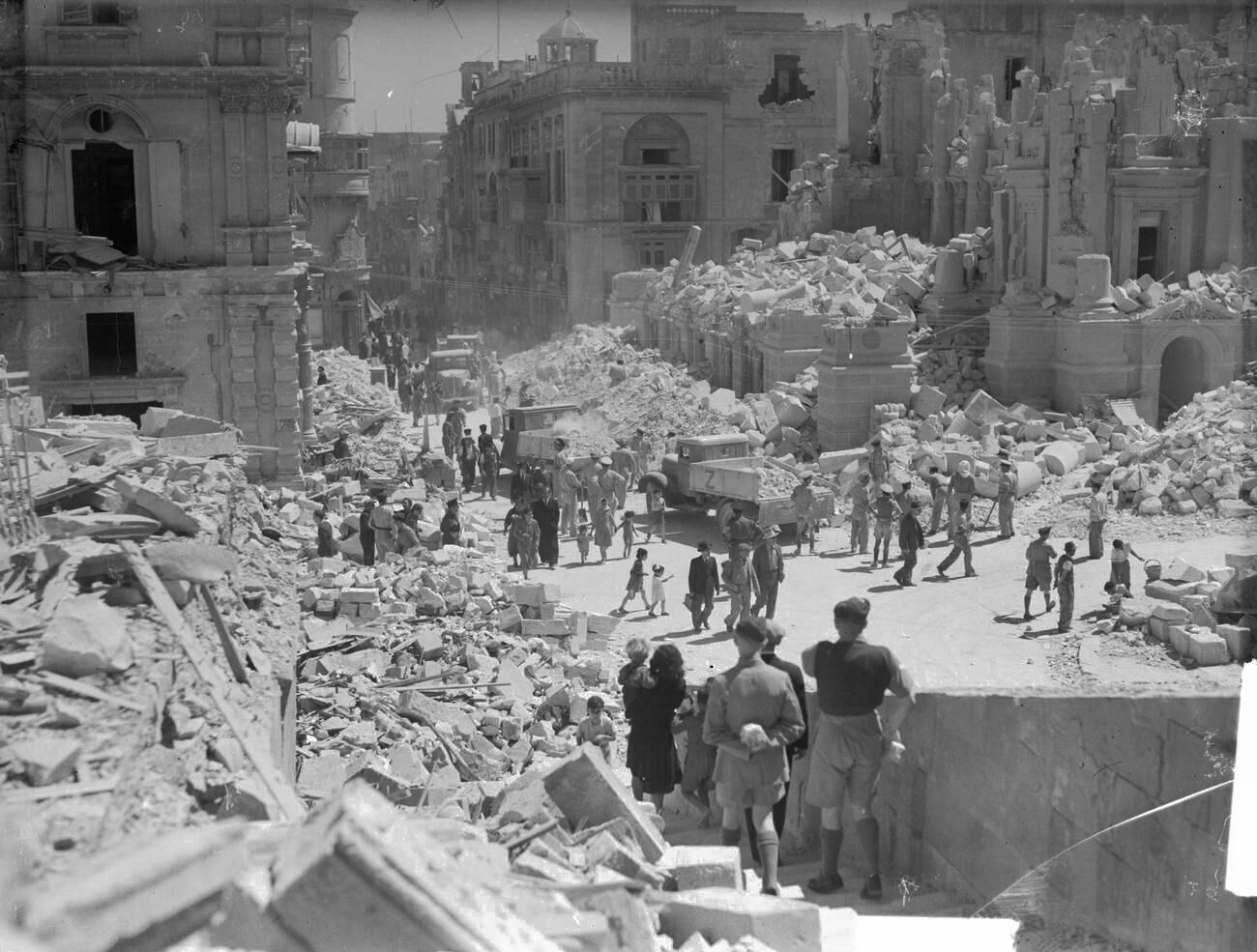
Service personnel and civilians clear up debris on the heavily bomb-damaged Strada Reale in Valletta on 1 May 1942

Before World War II, Valletta was the location of the Royal Navy's Mediterranean Fleet's headquarters. However, despite Winston Churchill's objections, (Note: Bierman & Smith (2002) page 36 online. Viking. 2002. ISBN 9780670030408.) the command was moved to Alexandria, Egypt, in April 1937 fearing it was too susceptible to air attacks from Europe. At the time of the Italian declaration of war (10 June 1940), Malta had a garrison of less than four thousand soldiers and about five weeks of food supplies for the population of about three hundred thousand. In addition, Malta's air defences consisted of about forty-two anti-aircraft guns (thirty-four "heavy" and eight "light") and four Gloster Gladiators, for which three pilots were available.

Being a British colony, situated close to Sicily and the Axis shipping lanes, Malta was bombarded by the Italian and German air forces. Malta was used by the British to launch attacks on the Italian navy and had a submarine base. It was also used as a listening post, reading German radio messages including Enigma traffic.

The first air raids against Malta occurred on 11 June 1940; there were six attacks that day. The island's biplanes ability to defend the island was limited due to the Luqa Airfield being unfinished; however, the airfield was ready by the seventh attack. Initially, the Italians would fly at about 5,500 m, then they dropped down to three thousand metres (in order to improve the accuracy of their bomb-aiming). Journalist Mabel Strickland spoke of the Italian bombing efforts as such: "The Italians decided they didn't like [the Gladiators and AA guns], so they dropped their bombs twenty miles off Malta and went back." (Note: Bierman & Smith (2002)) Despite these words, the accuracy of Italian bombers improved after repeated attempts, causing a great deal of devastation to both military and civilian infrastructure in Malta. However, these raids proved ineffective to the Axis siege efforts, as any damage incurred was eventually repaired before a new wave of bombers could launch bombing runs over the islands.

By the end of August, the Gladiators were reinforced by twelve Hawker Hurricanes which had arrived via HMS Argus. During the first five months of combat, the island's aircraft destroyed or damaged about thirty-seven Italian aircraft, while suffering even greater losses than the Italians. Italian fighter pilot Francisco Cavalera observed, "Malta was really a big problem for us—very well-defended.". Nevertheless, the Italian bombing campaign was causing serious damage to the island's infrastructure and the ability of the Royal Navy to operate effectively in the Mediterranean.

On Malta, 330 people had been killed and 297 were seriously wounded from the war's inception until December 1941. In January 1941, the German X. Fliegerkorps arrived in Sicily as the Afrika Korps arrived in Libya. Over the next four months 820 people were killed and 915 seriously wounded.

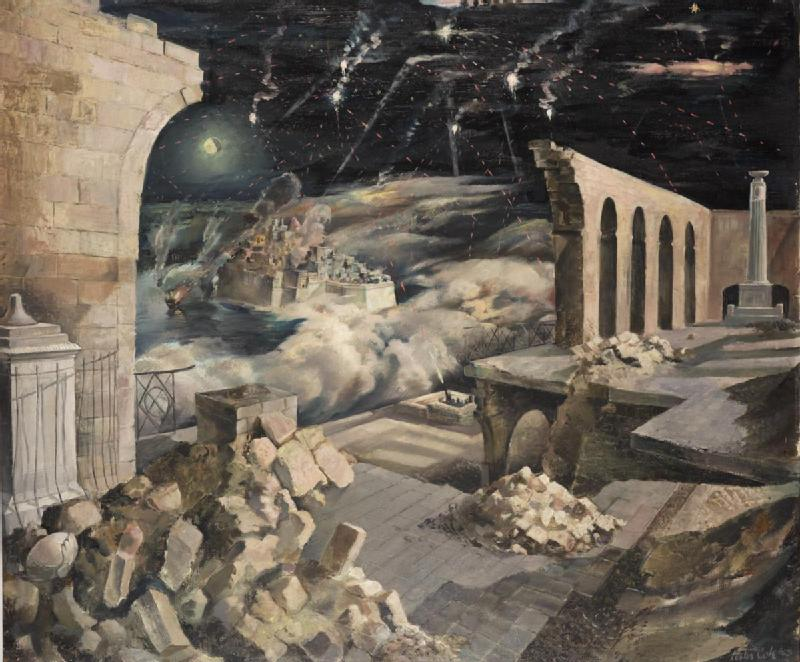
Illustration of the bomb-damaged Upper Barrakka Gardens in 1943

On 15 April 1942, King George VI awarded the George Cross (the highest civilian award for gallantry) "to the island fortress of Malta — its people and defenders". Franklin D. Roosevelt arrived on 8 December 1943, and presented a United States Presidential Citation to the people of Malta on behalf of the people of United States. He presented the scroll on 8 December but dated it 7 December for symbolic reasons. In part it read: "Under repeated fire from the skies, Malta stood alone and unafraid in the centre of the sea, one tiny bright flame in the darkness – a beacon of hope for the clearer days which have come." (The complete citation now stands on a plaque on the wall of the Grand Master's Palace on Republic Street, in the town square of Valletta.)

In 1942, a convoy code-named Operation Pedestal was sent to relieve Malta. Five ships, including the tanker SS Ohio, managed to arrive in the Grand Harbour, with enough supplies for Malta to survive. In the following year Franklin D. Roosevelt and Winston Churchill visited Malta. George VI also arrived in Grand Harbour for a visit.

During the Second World War, Ugo Mifsud and George Borg Olivier were the only remaining Nationalist members of parliament of Malta. Mifsud fainted after delivering a very passionate defence against the deportation to concentration camps in Uganda of Enrico Mizzi and 49 other Italian Maltese accused of pro-Italian political activities. He died a few days later.

In 1943, the Allies coordinated the invasion of Sicily from the Lascaris War Rooms in Valletta. Following the Armistice of Cassibile later in 1943, a large part of the Italian Navy surrendered to the British in Malta.

The Malta Conference was held in 1945, in which Churchill and Roosevelt met prior to the Yalta Conference with Joseph Stalin.

The 1946 National Assembly resulted in a new constitution in 1947. This restored Malta's self-government, with Paul Boffa as Prime Minister. On 5 September 1947, universal suffrage for women in Malta was granted. That year, Agatha Barbara was the first woman elected as a Maltese Member of Parliament.

=== From home rule to independence ===
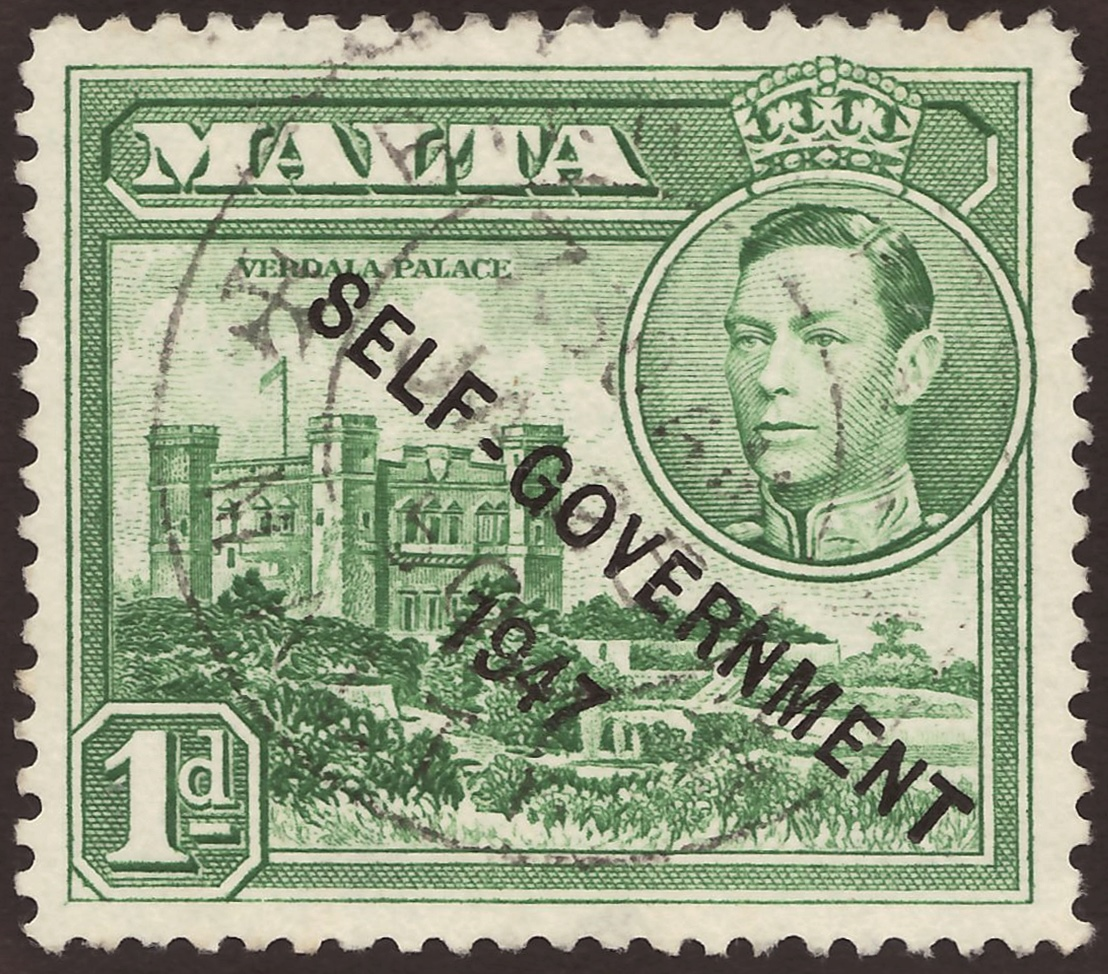
1947 stamp with George VI commemorating self-government

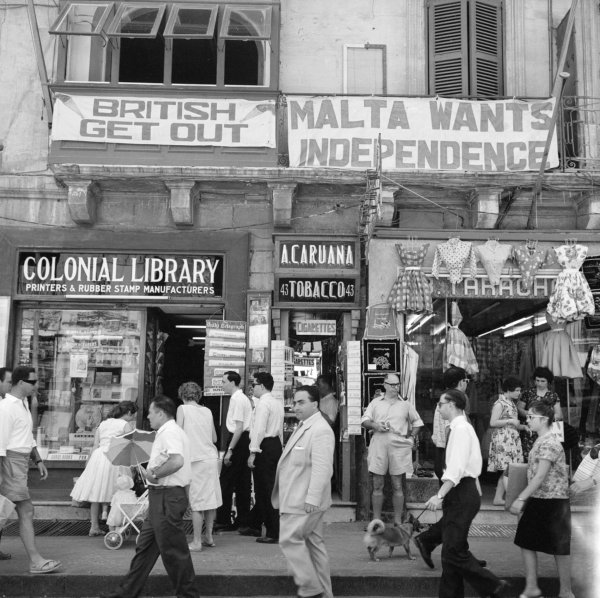
Malta Labour Party club in Valletta with anti-British and pro-Independence signs in the late 1950s

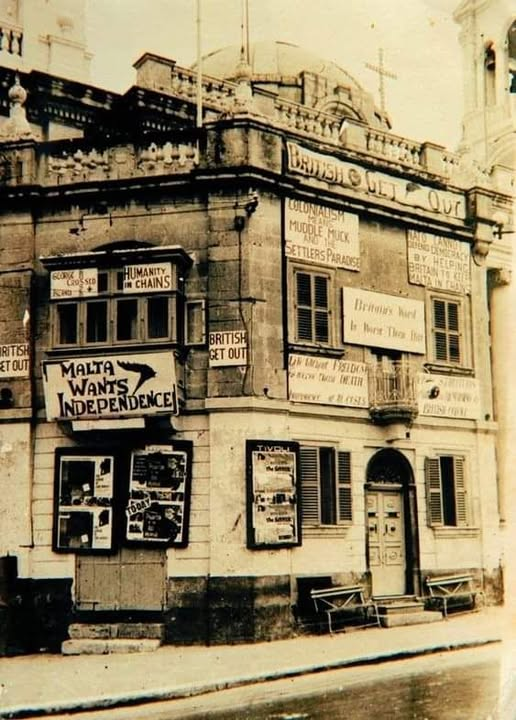
Pro-independence signs at the Paola Labour Party club

After the Second World War, the islands achieved self-rule, with the Malta Labour Party (MLP) of Dom Mintoff seeking either full integration with the UK or else "self-determination" (independence) and the Partit Nazzjonalista (PN) of George Borg Olivier favouring independence, with the same "dominion status" that Canada, Australia and New Zealand enjoyed.

The 1953 Coronation incident (where, initially, no invitation was sent for a Maltese delegation to attend the Coronation of Queen Elizabeth II), temporarily united Maltese politicians. After the MLP's electoral victory in 1955, in December Round Table Talks were held in London, on the future of Malta, namely the Integration proposal put forward by Mintoff. It was attended by the new Prime Minister Dom Mintoff, Borg Olivier, and other Maltese politicians, along with the British Colonial Secretary, Alan Lennox-Boyd. The British government agreed to offer the islands their own representation in British Parliament, with three seats in the House of Commons, with the Home Office taking over responsibility for Maltese affairs from the Colonial Office. Under the proposals, the Maltese Parliament would retain authority over all affairs except defence, foreign policy, and taxation. The Maltese were also to have social and economic parity with the UK, to be guaranteed by the British Ministry of Defence (MoD) the islands' main source of employment.

A UK integration referendum was held on 11 and 12 February 1956, in which 77.02% of voters were in favour of the proposal, but owing to a boycott by the Nationalist Party and the Church, only 59.1% of the electorate voted, thereby rendering the result inconclusive.

There were also concerns expressed by British MPs that the representation of Malta at Westminster would set a precedent for other colonies, and influence the outcome of general elections.

In addition, the decreasing strategic importance of Malta to the Royal Navy meant that the British government was increasingly reluctant to maintain the naval dockyards. Following a decision by the Admiralty to dismiss 40 workers at the dockyard, Mintoff declared that "representatives of the Maltese people in Parliament declare that they are no longer bound by agreements and obligations toward the British government" (the 1958 Caravaggio incident). In response, the Colonial Secretary sent a cable to Mintoff, stating that he had "recklessly hazarded" the whole integration plan.

Under protest, Dom Mintoff resigned as Prime Minister along with all the MLP deputies on 21 April 1958. Georgio Borg Olivier was offered to form an alternative government by Governor Laycock but refused. This led to the Governor declaring a state of emergency thus suspending the constitution and Malta was placed under direct colonial administration from London. The MLP had now fully abandoned support for integration (when Mintoff's demands for financial guarantees were not accepted) and now advocated full independence from Britain. In 1959, an Interim Constitution provided for an Executive Council under British rule.

While France had implemented a similar policy in its colonies, some of which became overseas departments, the status offered to Malta from Britain constituted a unique exception. Malta was the only British colony where integration with the UK was seriously considered, and subsequent British governments have ruled out integration for remaining overseas territories, such as Gibraltar.

From 1959 Malta's British governor started to pursue a plan of economic development based on promoting tourism and tax competition, offering very low tax rates on pensions, royalties and dividends to attract British (referred to as ‘sixpenny settlers’) and former colonial pensioners. Malta saw a large influx of Britons from Rhodesia after 1967.

In 1961, the Blood Commission provided for a new constitution allowing for a measure of self-government and recognising the "State" of Malta. Giorgio Borg Olivier became Prime Minister the following year, when the Stolper report was delivered.

== Independent Malta (since 1964) ==
=== Nationalist governments (1964–1971) ===
Malta Independence Act 1964 (Note: Section 6.)
- Act of Parliament
- Parliament of the United Kingdom
- Long title: An Act to make provision for, and in connection with, the attainment by Malta of fully responsible status within the Commonwealth.
- Citation: 1964 c. 86
- Territorial extent: United Kingdom

Dates
- Royal assent: 31 July 1964
- Commencement: 21 September 1964 (Note: Section 1(1). The Malta Independence Order 1964 (SI 1964/1398).)
Other legislation
Amended by	Finance Act 1969; Statute Law (Repeals) Act 1969; Civil Aviation Act 1971; Statute Law (Repeals) Act 1974; Statute Law (Repeals) Act 1977; Interpretation Act 1978; International Organisations Act 1981; British Nationality Act 1981; Copyright, Designs and Patents Act 1988; Statute Law (Repeals) Act 1993; Merchant Shipping Act 1995; Commonwealth Act 2002; Armed Forces Act 2006

Status: Amended

Text of statute as originally enacted

Text of the Malta Independence Act 1964 as in force today (including any amendments) within the United Kingdom, from legislation.gov.uk.

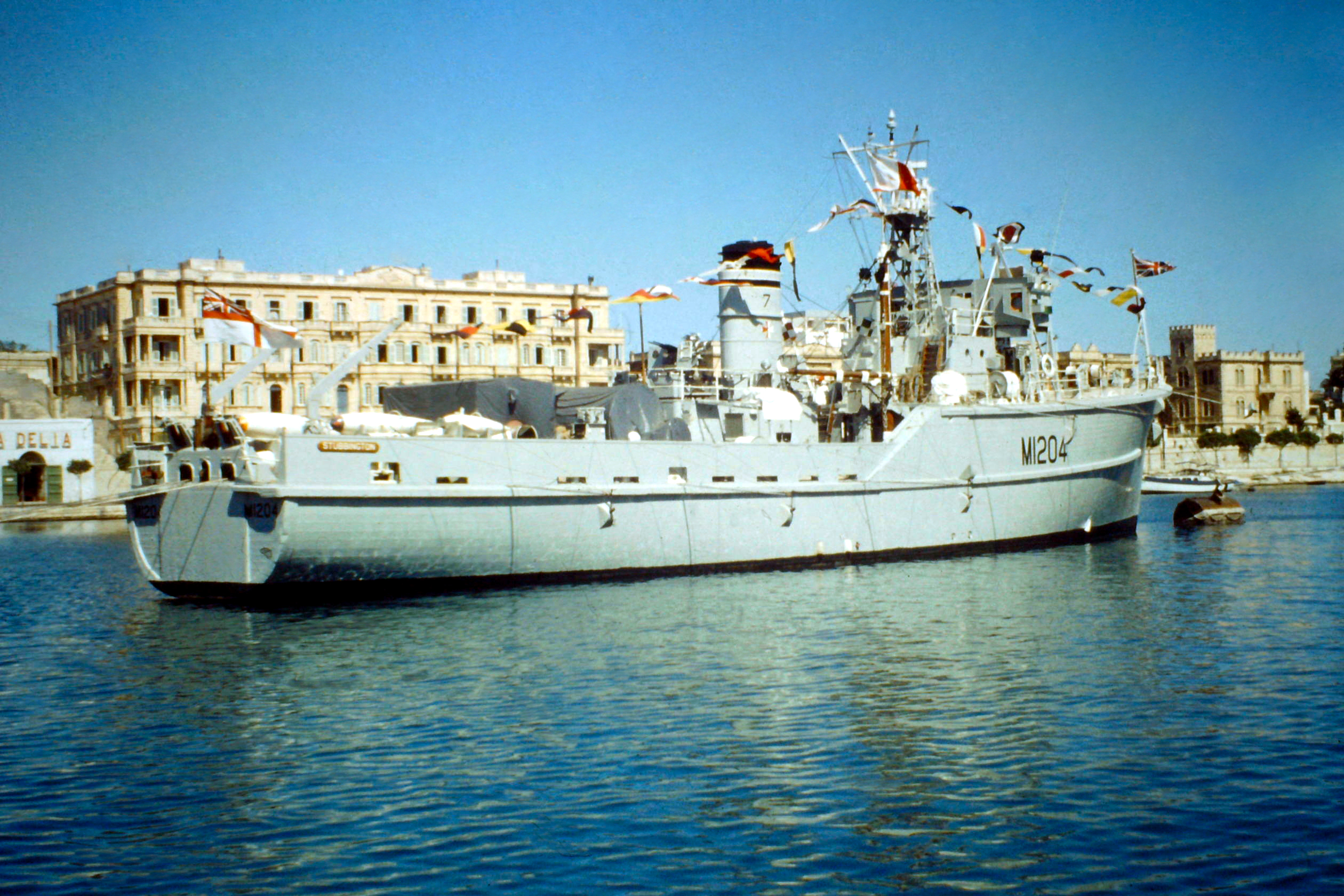
Ton-class minesweeper HMS Stubbington (M1204) moored in Msida Creek, Malta. The ship, seen on 21 September 1964, is decorated in honour of Malta's independence.

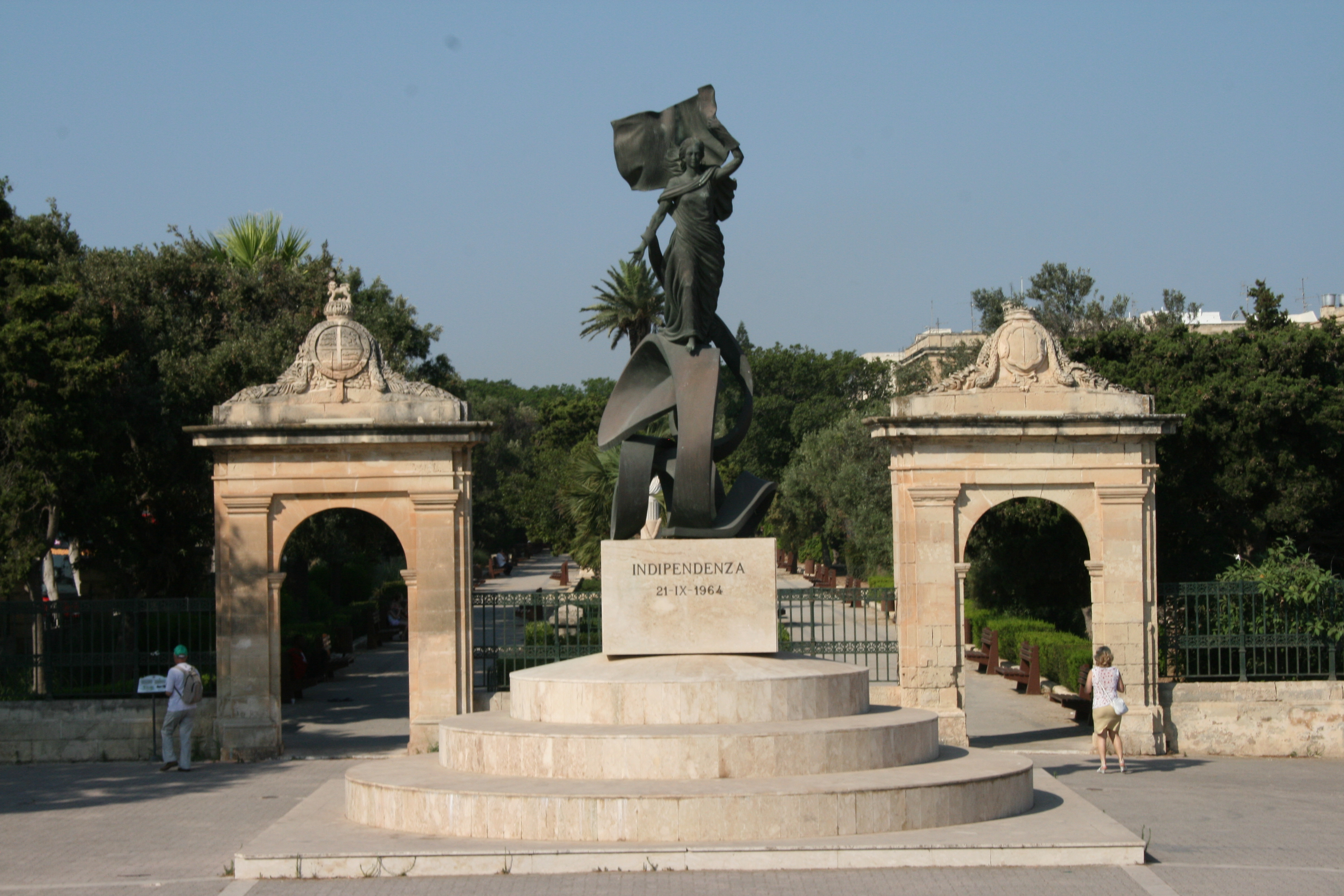
Monument to the independence of Malta in Floriana

Following the passage of the Malta Independence Act 1964 (c. 86) by the British Parliament and the approval of a new Maltese constitution by 54.5% of voters in a referendum, the State of Malta (Maltese: Stat ta’ Malta) was formed on 21 September 1964 as an independent constitutional monarchy, with Elizabeth II as Queen of Malta and head of state. The date continues to be celebrated annually as Independence Day (Maltese: Jum l-Indipendenza), a national holiday in Malta. On 1 December 1964, Malta was admitted to the United Nations.

In the first two post-independence electoral rounds, in 1962 and 1966 the Nationalist Party emerged as the largest party, gaining a majority of the Parliamentary seats. In these years, relations with Italy were of the utmost importance to secure independence and establish linkages with continental Europe. Malta signed four cooperation agreements with Italy in 1967, during a visit of Aldo Moro to the island.

In 1965 Malta joined the Council of Europe, and in 1970, Malta signed an Association Treaty with the European Economic Community.

=== Labour governments (1971–1987) ===
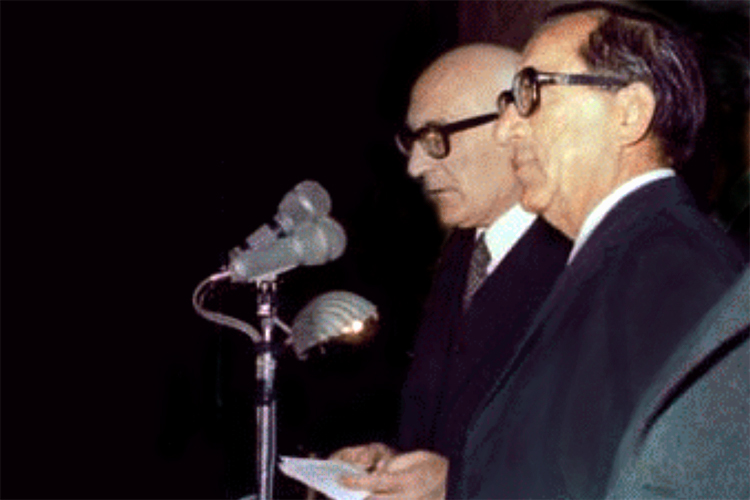
President Anthony Mamo and Prime Minister Dom Mintoff at the proclamation of the Republic of Malta, 13 December 1974

The elections of 1971 saw the Labour Party (MLP) under Dom Mintoff win by just over 4,000 votes. The Labour government immediately set out to re-negotiate the post-Independence military and financial agreements with the United Kingdom. The government also undertook nationalization programmes and the expansion of the public sector and the welfare state. Employment laws were updated with gender equality being introduced in salary pay. Concerning civil law, civil marriage was introduced and homosexuality and adultery were decriminalised (1973); capital punishment for murder was abolished in 1971. The following year, Malta entered into a Military Base Agreement with the United Kingdom and other NATO countries, after mediation by Italy's Aldo Moro.

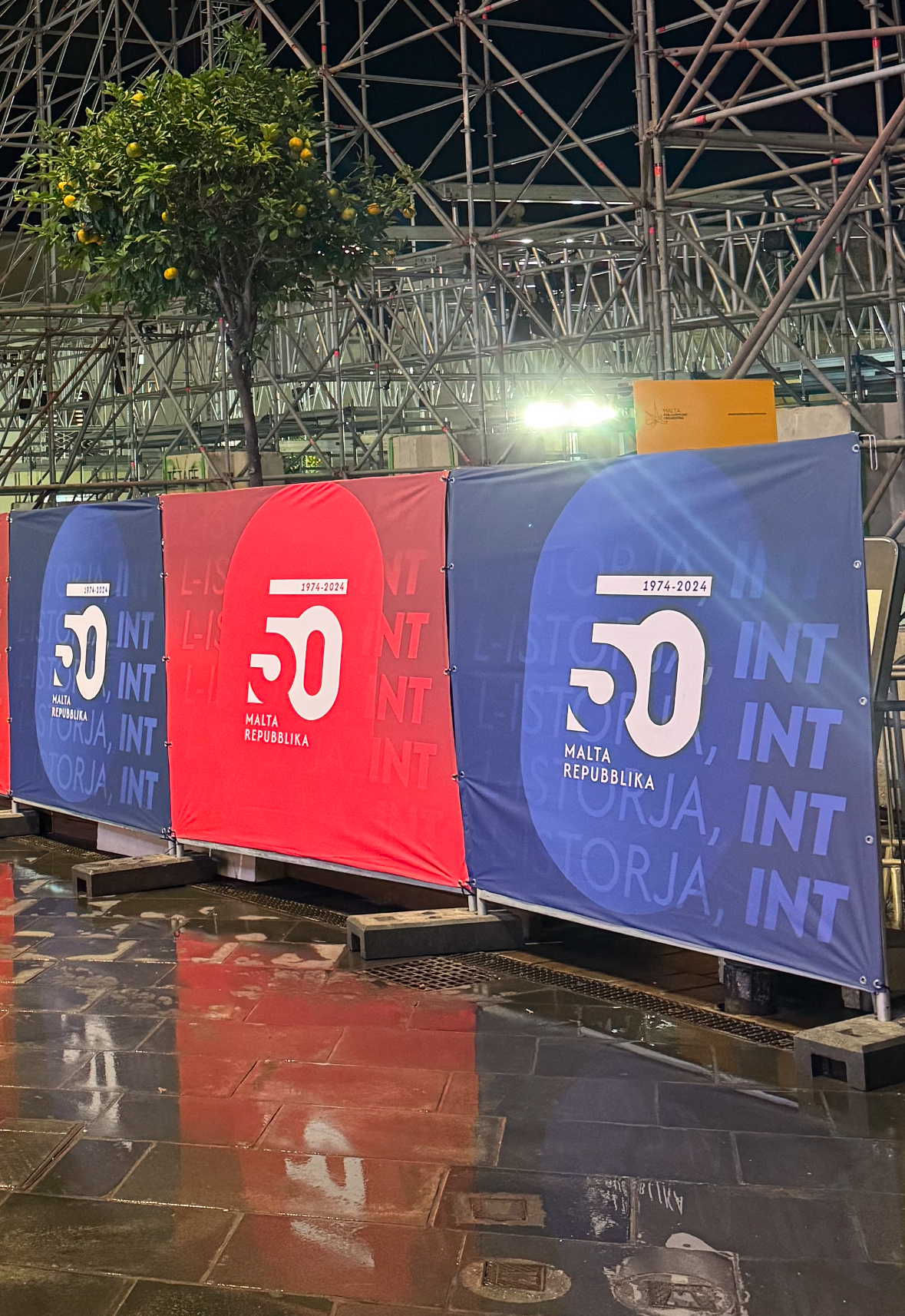
Advertisements in Valletta for Malta celebrating 50 years as a republic.

Through a package of constitutional reforms, Malta became a republic on 13 December 1974, with the last Governor-General, Sir Anthony Mamo, as its first President. The Ġieħ ir-Repubblika Act, promulgated the following year, abolished all titles of nobility in Malta and mandated that they cease to be recognised.

The Party was confirmed in office in the 1976 elections. Between 1976 and 1981 Malta went through difficult times and the Labour government demanded that the Maltese tighten their belts in order to overcome the difficulties Malta was facing. There were shortages of essential items; water and electricity supplies were systematically suspended for two or three days a week. Political tensions increased, notably on Black Monday, when following an attempted assassination of the Prime Minister, the premises of the Times of Malta were burned and the house of the Leader of Opposition was attacked.

==== End of British presence and new regional alliances ====
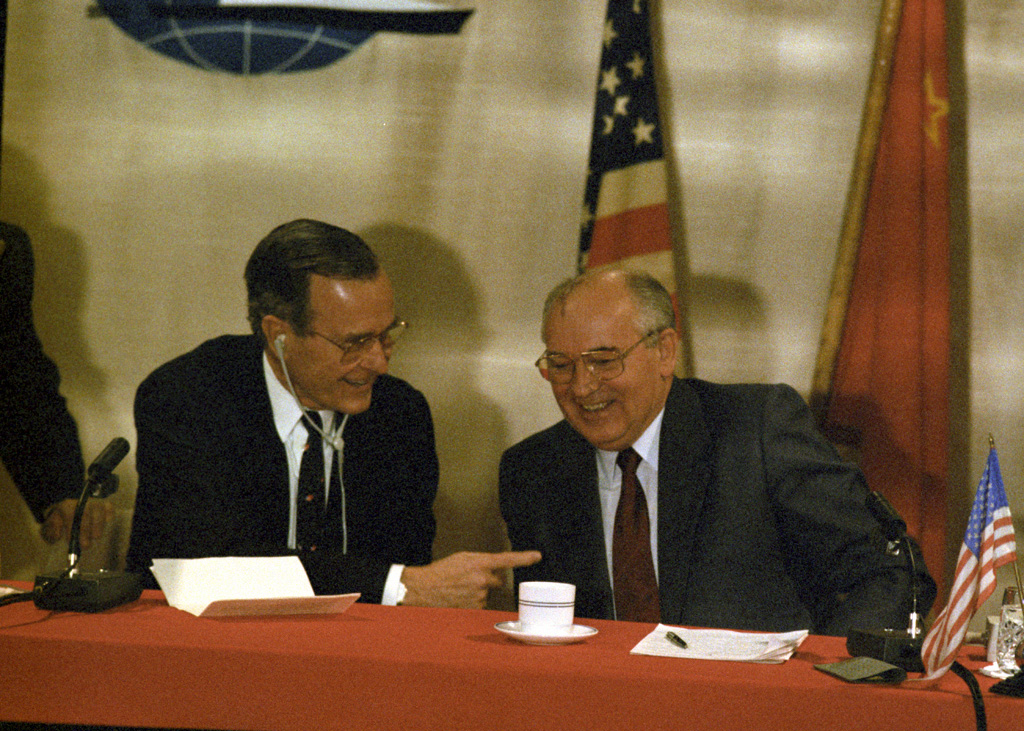
U.S. President George H. W. Bush and USSR leader Mikhail Gorbachev meeting in Valletta in December 1989.

On 1 April 1979 the last British forces left the island after the end of the economic pact to stabilize the Maltese economy. This is celebrated as Freedom Day (Jum Il-Ħelsien) on 31 March. Celebrations start with a ceremony in Floriana near the War Memorial. A popular event on this day is the regatta. The regatta is held at the Grand Harbour with teams trying to win the Regatta Shield.

Under Mintoff's premiership, Malta began establishing close cultural and economic ties with Muammar Gaddafi's Libya, as well as diplomatic and military ties with North Korea.

During the Mintoff years, Libya had loaned several million dollars to Malta to make up for the loss of rental income which followed the closure of British military bases in Malta. These closer ties with Libya meant a dramatic new (but short-lived) development in Maltese foreign policy: Western media reported that Malta appeared to be turning its back on NATO, the UK, and Europe generally. History books were published that began to spread the idea of a disconnection between the Italian and Catholic populations, and instead tried to promote the theory of closer cultural and ethnic ties with North Africa. This new development was noted by Boissevain in 1991: "The Labour government broke off relations with NATO and sought links with the Arab world. After 900 years of being linked to Europe, Malta began to look southward. Muslims, still remembered in folklore for savage pirate attacks, were redefined as blood brothers".

Malta and Libya had entered into a Friendship and Cooperation Treaty, in response to repeated overtures by Gaddafi for a closer, more formal union between the two countries; and, for a brief period, Arabic had become a compulsory subject in Maltese secondary schools. In 1984 the Mariam Al-Batool Mosque was officially opened by Muammar Gaddafi in Malta, two years after its completion.

In 1980 an oil rig of the Italian company Saipem commissioned by Texaco to drill on behalf of the Maltese government 68 nautical miles south-east of Malta had to stop operations after being threatened by a Libyan gunboat. Both Malta and Libya claimed economic rights to the area and this incident raised tensions. The matter was referred to the International Court of Justice in 1982 but the court's ruling in 1985 dealt only with the delineation of a small part of the contested territory.

In 1980, Malta signed a neutrality agreement with Italy, under which Malta agreed not to enter into any alliance and Italy agreed to guarantee Malta's neutrality. Malta's relations with Italy have been described as "generally excellent".

==== Constitutional crisis in the 1980s ====
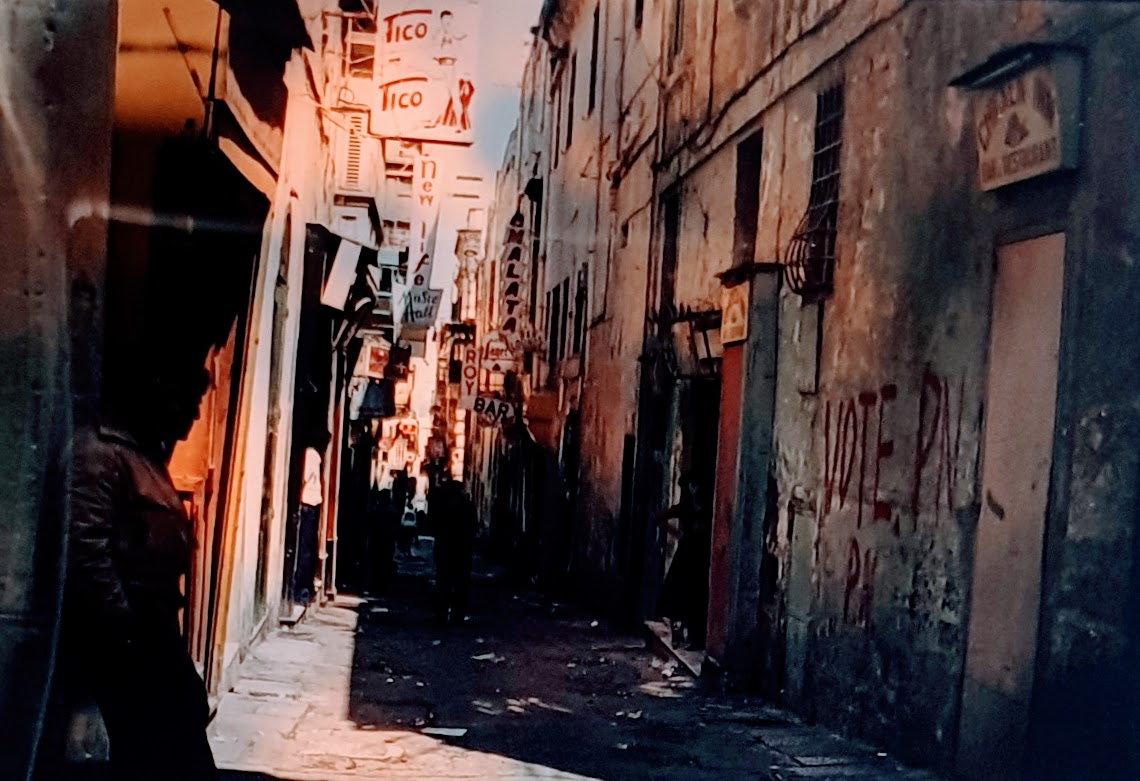
A "Vote PN" graffiti in Strait street, Valletta, 1980

The 1981 general elections saw the Nationalist Party (NP) gaining an absolute majority of votes, yet the Labour winning the majority of parliamentary seats under the Single Transferable Vote and Mintoff remained Prime Minister, leading to a political crisis. The Nationalists, now led by Eddie Fenech Adami, refused to accept the electoral result and also refused to take their seats in Parliament for the first years of the legislature, mounting a campaign demanding that Parliament should reflect the democratic will of the people. Despite this, the Labour government remained in power for the full five-year term. Mintoff resigned as Prime Minister and Party leader and appointed Karmenu Mifsud Bonnici as his successor in 1984.

The Mifsud Bonnici years were characterised by political tensions and violence. After a five-year debate, Fenech Adami, through the intervention of Dom Mintoff, reached an agreement with Karmenu Mifsud Bonnici to improve the constitution. Constitutional amendments were made voted and made effective in January 1987 which guaranteed that the party with an absolute majority of votes would be given a majority of parliamentary seats in order to govern. This paved the way for the return of the Nationalist Party to government later that year.

=== Accession process to the European Union (1987–2004) ===
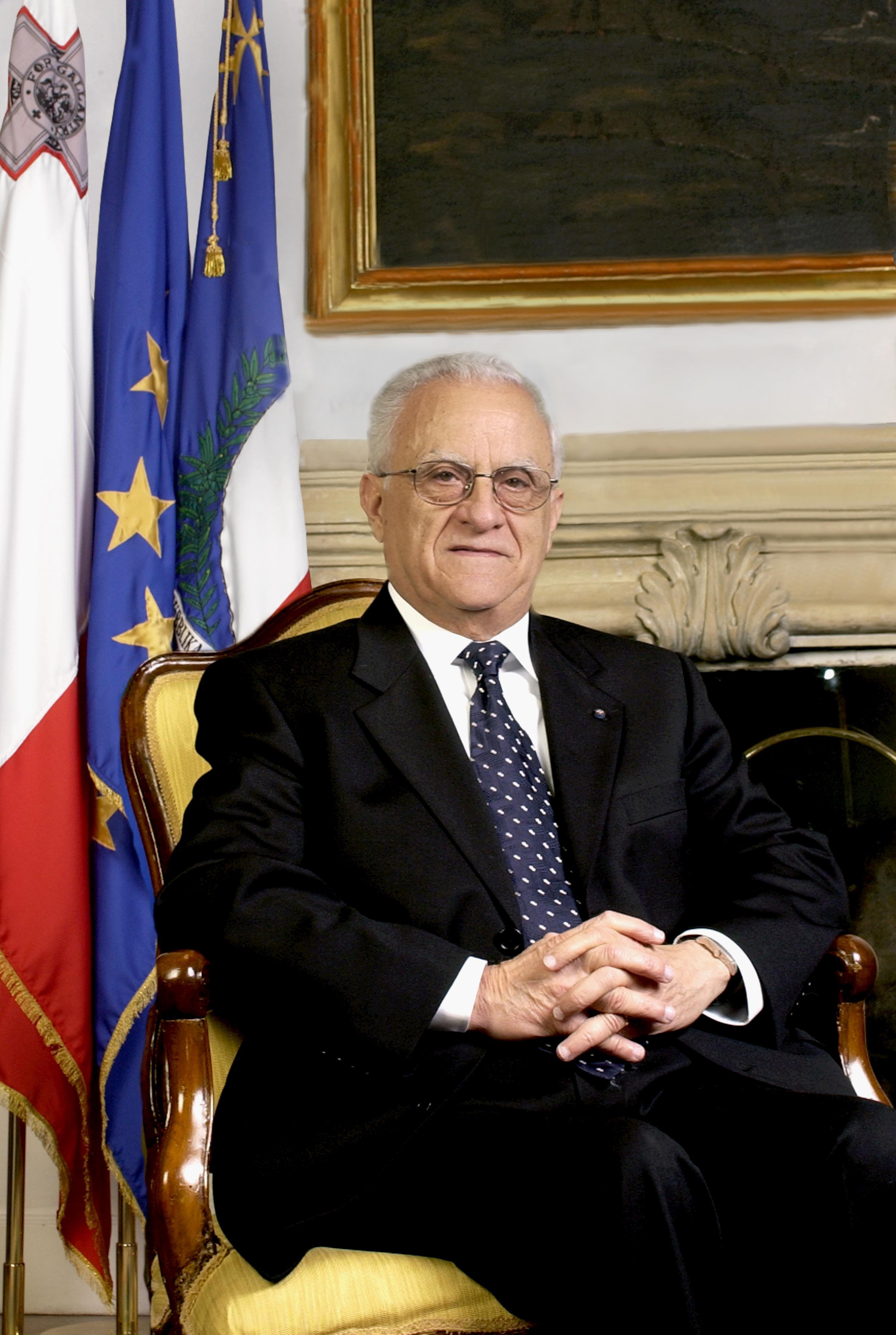
Eddie Fenech Adami, Prime Minister of Malta 1987–96 and 1998–2004, and President of Malta 2004–09

The general elections that followed in 1987 saw the Nationalist Party achieve such a majority of votes. The new Nationalist administration of Edward Fenech Adami sought to improve Malta's ties with Western Europe and the United States. The Nationalist Party advocated Malta's membership in the European Union presenting an application on 16 July 1990. This became a divisive issue, with Labour opposing membership.

A wide-ranging programme of liberalisation and public investments meant the confirmation in office of the Nationalists with a larger majority in the 1992 elections. In 1993, local councils were re-established in Malta.

General elections were held in Malta on 26 October 1996; although Labour received the most votes, the Nationalists won the most seats. The 1987 constitutional amendments had to be used for the second time, and the Labour Party was awarded an additional four seats to ensure they had a majority in Parliament. Malta's EU application was subsequently frozen. A split in the Labour Party in 1998, between the PM Sant and the former PM Mintoff (died in 2012) resulted in the government losing the majority. Notwithstanding the President of the Republic's preference for a negotiated solution, all attempts proved futile, and he had no other option but to accept Sant and his government's resignation and a call for early elections.

On being returned to office in the 1998 elections with a wide 13,000 vote margin, the Nationalist Party reactivated the EU membership application. Malta was formally accepted as a candidate country at the Helsinki European Council of December 1999. In 2000, capital punishment was abolished also from the military code of Malta.

EU accession negotiations were concluded late in 2002 and a referendum on membership in 2003 saw 90.86% casting a valid vote of which 53.65% were "yes" votes. Labour stated that it would not be bound by this result were it returned to power in the following general election that year. In the circumstances, elections were called and the Nationalist Party, led by Prime minister Fenech Adami, won another mandate, In April 2004, Eddie Fenech Adami was sworn in as President of Malta. Lawrence Gonzi succeeded him as Prime Minister and the leader of the Nationalist Party. The accession treaty was signed and ratified and Malta joined the EU on 1 May 2004. A consensus on membership was subsequently achieved with Labour saying it would respect this result. Joe Borg was appointed as first Maltese European commissioner in the first Barroso Commission.

=== Malta in the European Union (2004–present) ===
Malta's accession to the European Union in 2004 had important implications for the state's foreign policy. Notably, Malta was required to withdraw from the Non-Aligned Movement of which the state had been an active member since 1971.

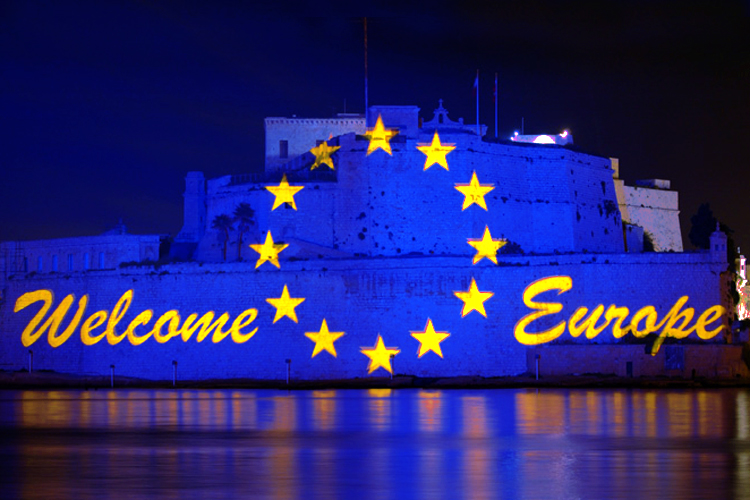
Celebrations at Fort Saint Angelo commemorating Malta's entry into the EU in 2004

In the context of EU membership, Malta joined the Eurozone on 1 January 2008; the 2008 election confirmed Gonzi in the premiership, while in 2009 George Abela became President of Malta.

On 28 May 2011, the Maltese voted 'yes' in the consultative divorce referendum. At that time, Malta was one of only three countries in the world, along with the Philippines and the Vatican City, in which divorce was not permitted. As a consequence of the referendum outcome, a law allowing divorce under certain conditions was enacted in the same year.

Following a corruption scandal John Dalli had to resign and was replaced by Tonio Borg as Maltese commissioner in 2012. A snap election was called for March 2013 after the Gonzi government lost the Parliamentary majority. The Nationalist Party lost the election after having governed Malta more than 15 years since 1987 (except for a period from 1996 to 1998). Labour Party leader Joseph Muscat was elected as Prime Minister.

In April 2019, the parliament elected George Vella as the 10th President of the Republic of Malta to succeed Marie-Louise Coleiro Preca.

On 16 October 2017, Maltese journalist and anti-corruption activist Daphne Caruana Galizia was assassinated in a car bomb near her residence in Bidnija. Her murder caused an uproar of criticism for the Labour government and the judicial system on the islands. Following evidence of implication between Joseph Muscat's close circle and the arrest of Yorgen Fenech, a long series of protests on the islands and international criticism precipitated the 2019–2020 political crisis. This resulted in the resignation of Prime Minister Joseph Muscat, Minister Konrad Mizzi, and Prime Minister's Chief of Staff Keith Schembri. An internal election on 11 January 2020 within the Maltese Labour party elected Robert Abela, son of former president George Abela, as party leader, and Prime Minister of Malta.

Malta became the first country in the European Union to legalize recreational use of cannabis on 14 December 2021.

In March 2022, the ruling Labour party, led by Prime Minister Robert Abela, won its third successive election. It gained even bigger victory than in 2013 and in 2017. On 4 April 2025, Myriam Spiteri Debono was sworn in as the President of Malta.

== See also ==
- Culture of Malta
- History of the Jews in Malta
- List of heads of state of Malta
- Malta Summit
- Norman-Arab-Byzantine culture
- Operation Pedestal
- Timeline of Maltese history
- History of banking in Malta

== Bibliography ==
- Cassar, Carmel (2000). A Concise History of Malta. Msida: Mireva Publications. ISBN 1870579526 – via Google Books.
- Attard, Joseph (1988). Britain and Malta: The story of an era. Malta: Publishers Enterprises Group. ISBN 9789990900583 – via Google Books.
- Baldoli, Claudia. "The ‘Northern Dominator’ and the Mare Nostrum: Fascist Italy's ‘Cultural War’ in Malta." Modern Italy 13.1 (2008): 5-20.
- Bishku, Michael B. "The Middle Eastern Relations of Cyprus and Malta: From Independence to Nonalignment to the European Union." Mediterranean Quarterly 26.2 (2015): 42–62. excerpt Archived 9 July 2024 at the Wayback Machine
- Blouet, Brian W. (2007). The Story of Malta. Allied Publications. ISBN 9789990930818 – via Google Books.
- Bulmer, William Elliot. "Constrained majoritarianism: Westminster constitutionalism in Malta." Commonwealth & Comparative Politics 52.2 (2014): 232–253.
- Buttigieg, Emanuel. "Childhood and adolescence in early modern Malta (1565-1632)." Journal of Family History 33.2 (2008): 139–155.
- Castillo, Dennis. The Santa Marija Convoy: Faith and Endurance in Wartime Malta, 1940–1942 (Lexington Books, 2011).
- Dimont, Charles (August 1955). "Malta and the British Connexion". History Today. Vol. 5, no. 8. pp. 545–553.
- Culican, William (1992), "Phoenicia and Phoenician Colonization", The Cambridge Ancient History, Cambridge: Cambridge University Press, pp. 461–546.
- Filigheddu, Paolo (2007), "Die Ortsnamen des Mittelmeerraums in der Phönizischen und Punischen Überlieferung", Ugarit-Forschungen: Internationales Jahrbuch für die Altertumskunde Syrien-Palästinas, vol. 38 2006, Munster: Ugarit Verlag, pp. 149–266. (in German)
- Harwood, Mark. Malta in the European Union (Routledge, 2016).
- Heraclidou, Antigone. "Politics of education and language in Cyprus and Malta during the inter-war years." Journal of Mediterranean Studies 23.1 (2014): 75–88. excerpt Archived 9 July 2024 at the Wayback Machine
- Katsourides, Yiannos, and Antigone Heraclidou. "Nationalism and Decolonisation in the Mediterranean: Cyprus and Malta Compared, 1918–1964." Journal of Mediterranean Studies 23.1 (2014): 1–7.
- Luke, Harry (1949). Malta: An Account and an Appreciation. UK: Harrap – via Google Books.
- Rudolf, Uwe Jens. Historical dictionary of Malta (Rowman & Littlefield, 2018).
- Stephenson, Charles (2004). The Fortifications of Malta 1530–1945. UK: Osprey Publishing. ISBN 9781782007067 – via Google Books.
- Vella, John (January 2023), "Greek Words in Maltese Harbour Toponymy" (PDF), Athens Journal of Mediterranean Studies, vol. 9, pp. 25–52, archived (PDF) from the original on 18 April 2024.
- Yiangou, Anastasia. "The Political Impact of World War II on Cyprus and Malta." Journal of Mediterranean Studies 23.1 (2014): 101–112. online
