= Henri Bresc =

French historian

- Born: 12 December 1939; Cannes, France
- Occupation: Historian
- Writing career
- Subject: Mediaeval history

Henri Bresc (born 12 December 1939) is a French historian who specialises in the Mediaeval history of Sicily, and particularly in the inter-relation in the Mediterranean area between the three principal monotheistic religions. From 1990 until 2008 he was a professor at Paris X Nanterre university, and is director of its Centre d'Histoire Sociale et Culturelle de l'Occident. He previously taught at the University of Nice.

In 2002 Bresc received an honorary degree in letters from the University of Palermo.

== Works ==
Among Bresc's many publications are:

- Livre et société en Sicile (1299-1499). Palermo: Centro di Studi Filologici e Linguistici Siciliani, 1971
- La Correspondance de Pierre Ameilh, archevêque de Naples, puis d'Embrun (1363-1369). Paris: Centre National de la Recherche Scientifique, 1972
- Un monde méditerranéen. Économie et société en Sicile (1300-1450). Rome: École française de Rome, 1986
- Idrîsî: La première géographie de l'Occident. Paris: Garnier-Flammarion, 1999 (with Annliese Nef)
- Una stagione in Sicilia: Nompar de Caumont a Isnello (1420), La Fardelliana, 6/1-2 (1991), pp. 5–25 (in Italian)
- Arabes de langue, Juifs de religion. L'évolution du judaïsme sicilien dans l'environnement latin, XIIe -XVe siècles. Saint-Denis: Bouchène, 2001
  - Italian edition: Arabi per lingua, ebrei per religione. Messina: GEM, 2001
