= List of invasions =

List of military invasions

An invasion is a military offensive in which sizable number of combatants of one geopolitical entity aggressively enter territory controlled by another such entity, generally with the objectives of establishing or re-establishing control, retaliation for real or perceived actions, liberation of previously lost territory, forcing the partition of a country, gaining concessions or access to natural resources or strategic positions, effecting a change in the ruling government, or any combination thereof.

== 1945–1999 ==
| Invasion | Invading forces | Defending forces |
|---|---|---|
| 1999 invasion of Kargil | Pakistan | India |
| 1998 invasion of Democratic Republic of Congo | Uganda; Rwanda; Burundi | Democratic Republic of the Congo |
| 1998 invasion of Ethiopia | Eritrea | Ethiopia |
| 1994 invasion of Haiti | United States | Haiti |
| 1991 invasion of Iraq | United States; United Kingdom; France; Saudi Arabia; Egypt; Bahrain Canada; Italy; Morocco; Oman; Qatar; Syria | Iraq |
| 1991 invasion of Saudi Arabia | Iraq | Saudi Arabia |
| 1990 invasion of Kuwait | Iraq | Kuwait |
| 1990 invasion of Rwanda | Rwandan Patriotic Front | Rwanda |
| 1989 invasion of Liberia | National Patriotic Front of Liberia | Liberia |
| 1989 invasion of Panama | United States | Panama |
| 1988 invasion of Spratly Islands | China | Vietnam |
| 1984 Indian capture of Siachen | India | Pakistan |
| 1983 invasion of Grenada | United States | Grenada |
| 1982 invasion of Iraq | Iran | Iraq |
| 1982 invasion of Lebanon | Israel | Palestine Liberation Organization; Syria |
| 1982 invasion of Falklands | Argentina | United Kingdom |
| 1980 invasion of Iran | Iraq | Iran |
| 1979 invasion of Afghanistan | Soviet Union | Afghanistan |
| 1979 invasion of Thailand | Vietnam | Thailand |
| 1979 invasion of Vietnam | China | Vietnam |
| 1979 invasion of Uganda | Tanzania | Uganda |
| 1979 invasion of Chad | Libya | Chad |
| 1978 invasion of Cambodia | Vietnam | Cambodia |
| 1978 invasion of Tanzania | Uganda | Tanzania |
| 1978 invasion of Lebanon | Israel | Palestine Liberation Organization |
| 1977 invasion of Ethiopia | Somalia | Ethiopia |
| 1976 invasion of Lebanon | Syria | Lebanon |
| 1975 invasion of East Timor | Indonesia | East Timor |
| 1975 invasion of Spanish Sahara | Morocco | Spain |
| 1975 invasion of Koh Poulo Wai | Vietnam | Cambodia |
| 1975 invasion of Thổ Chu Islands | Cambodia | Vietnam |
| 1975 invasion of South Vietnam | North Vietnam | South Vietnam |
| 1974 invasion of Cyprus | Turkey | Cyprus |
| 1974 invasion of Paracel Islands | China | South Vietnam |
| 1973 Invasion of Israel | Egypt; Syria | Israel |
| 1972 invasion of South Vietnam | North Vietnam | South Vietnam |
| 1971 invasion of Laos | South Vietnam; United States | North Vietnam |
| 1971 invasion of Pakistan and East Pakistan | India | Pakistan |
| 1970 invasion of Cambodia | United States; South Vietnam | North Vietnam |
| 1970 invasion of Cambodia | North Vietnam | (Cambodia) Khmer Republic |
| 1968 Invasion of Jordan | Israel | Jordan |
| 1968 invasion of Czechoslovakia | Soviet Union; Bulgaria; Hungary; Poland | Czechoslovakia |
| 1968 invasion of South Vietnam | North Vietnam; National Liberation Front; Soviet Union | South Vietnam; United States |
| 1967 invasion of Kingdom of Sikkim Nathu La and Cho La clashes | China | India; Kingdom of Sikkim |
| 1967 invasions of Biafra | Nigeria | Biafra |
| 1967 invasions of Biafra | Biafra | Nigeria |
| 1967 invasion of Egypt | Israel | Egypt |
| 1967 invasion of Syria | Israel | Syria |
| 1967 invasion of Jordan | Israel | Jordan |
| 1965 counter-invasion of Pakistan | India | Pakistan |
| 1965 invasion of Jammu and Kashmir | Pakistan | India |
| 1965 invasion of Dominican Republic | United States | Dominican Republic |
| 1962 invasion of Aksai Chin and Arunachal Pradesh | China | India |
| 1961 invasion of New Guinea | Indonesia | Netherlands |
| 1961 Indian annexation of Goa | India | Portugal |
| 1961 invasion of Cuba | United States: DRF | Cuba |
| 1958 invasion of Laos | North Vietnam | Laos |
| 1957 invasion of Spanish Sahara | Morocco | Spain: Spanish Sahara; France |
| 1956 invasion of Hungary | Soviet Union | Hungary |
| 1956 invasion of Egypt | France; United Kingdom; Israel | Egypt |
| 1954 Indian annexation of Dadra and Nagar Haveli | India | Portugal |
| 1950 invasion of North Korea | United Nations: United States; South Korea; United Kingdom | North Korea |
| 1950 invasion of South Korea | North Korea | South Korea |
| 1950 invasion of Tibet | China | Tibet |
| 1950 invasion of South Maluku | Indonesia | Republic of South Maluku |
| 1948 Indian annexation of Hyderabad | India | Hyderabad State |
| 1948 Arab League invasion of Israel | Arab League; Egypt; All-Palestine Protectorate; Transjordan; Iraq; Syria; Lebanon; Saudi Arabia; Yemen | Israel |
| 1947 invasion of Jammu and Kashmir | Pakistan | India; Jammu and Kashmir |
| 1946 invasion of Vietnam | France | Vietnam |
| 1945 invasion of Vietnam | France | Vietnam |
| 1945 invasion of Indonesia | Netherlands | Indonesia |

== World War II (1939–1945) ==
| Invasion | Invading forces | Defending forces |
|---|---|---|
| 1945 invasion of occupied Asia: Manchuria; Okinawa; Formosa; Iwo Jima; Burma | United States; Soviet Union; Vietnam; United Kingdom; Mongolia | Japan; Manchukuo; Azad Hind |
| 1945 invasion of occupied Europe: German mainland; General Government; Ostland; Poland; Austria | Soviet Union; Poland | Germany |
| 1945 invasion of Croatia | Soviet Union | Croatia |
| 1945 invasion of Slovakia | Soviet Union | Slovakia |
| 1945 invasion of Italy | United States; United Kingdom (Kingdom of Italy) Italy | Italy |
| 1944 invasion of Azad Hind | United Kingdom | Azad Hind |
| 1944 invasion of Bulgaria | Soviet Union | Bulgaria |
| 1944 invasion of Yugoslavia | Soviet Union | Yugoslavia |
| 1944 invasion of occupied Europe: Western Germany; Occupied France; Occupied Ukraine; Occupied Belgium; Occupied Netherlands; Occupied Luxembourg | United States; Soviet Union; United Kingdom; Canada | Germany |
| 1944 invasion of Albania | Soviet Union | Albania |
| 1944 invasion of the Pacific: Guam; Philippines; Marshall Islands | United States | Japan |
| 1944 invasion of East Asia | Japan | China |
| 1944 invasion of Romania | Soviet Union | Romania |
| 1944 invasion of Hungary | Germany | Hungary |
| 1943 invasion of Italy: Mainland; Sicily | United Kingdom; United States; Canada | Italy |
| 1943 invasion of the Pacific: Kolombangara; Gilbert Islands; Marshall Islands | Japan | United States |
| 1942 invasion of North Africa | United States; United Kingdom | France |
| 1942 invasion of Solomon Islands | United States; Australia | Japan |
| 1942 invasion of Alaska | Japan | United States |
| 1942 invasion of Vichy France | Germany | France |
| 1942 invasion of Madagascar | United Kingdom | France |
| 1942 invasion of UK Pacific: Singapore; New Guinea | Japan | United Kingdom |
| 1941 invasion of East Indies | Japan | Netherlands |
| 1941 invasion of US Pacific: Guam; Wake Island; Philippines | Japan | United States |
| 1941 invasion of UK Pacific: Borneo; Hong Kong; Malaya | Japan | United Kingdom |
| 1941 invasion of Sarawak | Japan | Sarawak |
| 1941 invasion of Thailand | Japan | Thailand |
| 1941 invasion of the Soviet Union: Occupied Poland; Belorussia; Baltic States; Ukraine; Bessarabia; Russia | (Nazi Germany) Germany | Soviet Union |
| 1941 invasion of Indochina | Thailand | France |
| 1941 invasion of Iran | Soviet Union; United Kingdom | Iran |
| 1941 invasion of Syria | United Kingdom | Syria |
| 1941 invasion of Lebanon | United Kingdom | Lebanon |
| 1941 invasion of Indochina | Japan | Vietnam |
| 1941 invasion of Greenland | United States | Greenland |
| 1941 invasion of Yugoslavia | Germany; Italy; Bulgaria; Hungary | Yugoslavia |
| 1941 invasion of Greece | Germany | Greece |
| 1941 invasion of Italian-occupied Albania | Greece | Albania Italy |
| 1941 invasion of Vietnam | Japan | Vietnam |
| 1941 invasion of Portuguese Timor | Australia; Netherlands | Portugal |
| 1940 invasion of Egypt | Italy; Germany; Bulgaria | Egypt |
| 1940 invasion of Greece | Italy; Albania | Greece |
| 1940 invasion of Sudan | Italy | Sudan |
| 1940 invasion of Kenya | Italy | Kenya |
| 1940 invasion of Somaliland | Italy | Somaliland |
| 1940 invasion of Vietnam | Japan | France |
| 1940 invasion of Iceland | United Kingdom | Iceland |
| 1940 invasion of Faroe Islands | United Kingdom | Denmark |
| 1940 invasion of Denmark | Germany | Denmark |
| 1940 invasion of Norway | Germany | Norway |
| 1940 invasion of Belgium | Germany | Belgium |
| 1940 invasion of France | Germany; Italy | France |
| 1940 invasion of Luxembourg | Germany | Luxembourg |
| 1940 invasion of the Netherlands | Germany | Netherlands |
| 1940 invasion of the Channel Islands | Germany | United Kingdom |
| 1939 invasion of China | Japan | China |
| 1939 invasion of Finland | Soviet Union | Finland |
| 1939 invasion of Lithuania | Soviet Union | Lithuania |
| 1939 invasion of Latvia | Soviet Union | Latvia |
| 1939 invasion of Estonia | Soviet Union | Estonia |
| 1939 invasion of French colonies: Spratly Islands; Paracel Islands | Japan | France |
| 1939 invasion of Poland | Soviet Union | Poland |
| 1939 invasion of Poland | Germany; Slovakia | Poland |

== Interwar (1918–1939) ==
| Invasion | Invading forces | Defending forces |
|---|---|---|
| 1939 invasion of Mongolia | Japan; Manchukuo | USSR; Mongolia |
| 1939 invasion of Albania | Italy | Albania |
| 1938 invasion of the Soviet Union | Japan | Soviet Union |
| 1938 invasion of Czechoslovakia | Germany; Hungary; Poland | Czechoslovakia |
| 1937 invasion of China | Japan | China |
| 1935 invasion of Ethiopia | Italy | Ethiopia |
| 1932 invasion of Bolivia | Paraguay | Bolivia |
| 1931 invasion of Manchuria | Japan | China |
| 1923 invasion of Corfu | Italy | Greece |
| 1923 invasion of the Ruhr | France; Belgium | Germany |
| 1920 invasion of Poland | Russian SFSR; Ukrainian SSR | Poland |
| 1919 invasion of Eastern Thrace and Western Anatolia | Greece | Turkey |
| 1919 invasion of Ukraine | Romania | Ukraine |
| 1919 invasion of Hungary | Romania | Hungary |
| 1919 invasion of Ukraine | Russian SFSR; Ukrainian SSR | Ukraine |
| 1918 invasion of Russia | United Kingdom; Canada; Japan; Czechoslovakia; Greece; Poland; United States; France; Australia; India; Romania; Serbia; Italy; China | Russian SFSR |

== World War I (1914–1918) ==
| Invasion | Invading forces | Defending forces |
|---|---|---|
| 1917 invasion of Hungary | United Kingdom | Austria-Hungary |
| 1916 invasion of Romania | Germany | Romania |
| 1916 invasion of Austria-Hungary | Romania | Austria-Hungary |
| 1916 invasion of Mexico | United States | Mexico |
| 1916 invasion of Vietnam | France | Vietnam |
| 1915 invasion of Russia | Germany; Austria-Hungary | Russia |
| 1915 invasion of Montenegro | Austria-Hungary | Montenegro |
| 1915 invasion of Serbia | Austria-Hungary; Bulgaria; Germany | Serbia |
| 1915 invasion of Ottoman Empire: Mesopotamia; Caucasus | United Kingdom; Russia | Ottoman Empire |
| 1915 invasion of Serbia | Austria-Hungary | Serbia |
| 1915 invasion of German South West Africa | South Africa | South-West Africa |
| 1914 invasion of German Pacific: Marshall Islands; Caroline Islands; Mariana Islands | Japan | Germany |
| 1914 invasion of France | Germany | France |
| 1914 invasion of East Africa | United Kingdom | East Africa |
| 1914 invasion of Tsingtao | Japan; United Kingdom | Germany |
| 1914 invasion of New Guinea | Australia | New Guinea |
| 1914 invasion of Samoa | New Zealand | Samoa |
| 1914 invasion of Kamerun | United Kingdom; France; Belgium | Kamerun |
| 1914 invasion of Galicia | Russia | Austria-Hungary |
| 1914 invasion of Germany | Russia | Germany |
| 1914 invasion of Serbia | Austria-Hungary | Serbia |
| 1914 invasion of South Africa | Germany | South Africa |
| 1914 invasion of Togoland | France; United Kingdom | Togoland |
| 1914 invasion of Alsace | France | Germany |
| 1914 invasion of Belgium | Germany | Belgium |
| 1914 invasion of Luxembourg | Germany | Luxembourg |

See also: World War I timeline

== 1800–1915 ==
| Invasion | Invading forces | Defending forces |
|---|---|---|
| 1915 invasion of Haiti | United States | Haiti |
| 1913 invasion of Bulgaria | Serbia; Romania; Greece; Montenegro; Ottoman Empire | Bulgaria |
| 1912 invasion of Macedonia | Bulgaria; Serbia; Greece; Montenegro | Ottoman Empire |
| 1911 invasion of Libya | Italy | Ottoman Empire |
| 1910 invasion of Korea | Japan | Korea |
| 1910 invasion of Tibet | China | Tibet |
| 1904 invasion of Russia | Japan | Russia |
| 1904 invasion of Tibet | United Kingdom | Tibet |
| 1903 invasion of Bolivia | Brazil | Bolivia |
| 1902 invasion of Manchuria | Korea | China |
| 1900 invasion of the South African Republic and the Orange Free State | British Empire: United Kingdom; Canada | South African Republic Orange Free State |
| 1900 invasion of China | United Kingdom; Russia; Japan; United States; France; Germany; Italy; Austria-Hungary | China |
| 1899 invasion of British Africa | South African Republic Orange Free State | British Empire: Natal; Cape Colony |
| 1898 invasion of the Philippines | United States | Philippines |
| 1898 invasion of Spain: Puerto Rico; Cuba; Guam | United States | Spain |
| 1897 invasion of Greece | Ottoman Empire | Greece |
| 1897 invasion of Crete | Greece | Ottoman Empire |
| 1895 invasion of South African Republic | British Empire: Cape Colony | South African Republic |
| 1895 invasion of Ethiopia | Italy | Ethiopia |
| 1895 invasion of Taiwan | Japan | Taiwan |
| 1894 invasion of China | Japan | China |
| 1894 invasion of Korea | Japan | Korea |
| 1893 invasion of Hawaii | United States | Hawaii |
| 1884 invasion of Chinese Tonkin | France | Vietnam China |
| 1879 invasion of Peru | Chile | Peru |
| 1879 invasion of Bolivia | Chile | Bolivia |
| 1878 invasion of Ottoman Turkey | Russia | Ottoman Empire |
| 1877 invasion of Ottoman Bulgaria | Russia Serbia Romania Montenegro Bulgarian Legion | Ottoman Bulgaria |
| 1871 invasion of France | North German Confederation | France |
| 1871 invasion of Korea | United States | Korea |
| 1868 invasion of Abyssinia | United Kingdom British India | Abyssinia |
| 1866 invasion of Korea | France | Korea |
| 1865 invasion of Tonkin, Vietnam | Black Flag Army | Siam Luang Phrabang |
| 1864 invasion of Peruvian Chincha Islands | Spain | Peru Chile |
| 1864 invasion of Paraguay | Brazil Argentina Uruguay | Paraguay |
| 1863 invasion of the United States | Confederate States of America | United States |
| 1862 invasion of the United States: Maryland; Kentucky | Confederate States of America | United States |
| 1862–1867 invasion of Mexico | France | Mexico |
| 1861–1865 invasions of the Confederate States: Virginia; Tennessee; Lower Seaboard; Pacific coast; West | United States | Confederate States of America |
| 1859 invasion of Lombardy-Venetia | Sardinia-Piedmont France | Lombardy-Venetia |
| 1859 invasion of Sardinia-Piedmont | Austria | Sardinia-Piedmont |
| 1858 invasion of Vietnam | France | Vietnam |
| 1856 invasion of China | United Kingdom France | China |
| 1855 invasion of Ottoman Turkey | Russia | Ottoman Empire |
| 1854–1855 invasions of Finland | United Kingdom | Grand Duchy of Finland |
| 1854 invasion of Russia | United Kingdom France | Russia |
| 1853 invasion of Moldavia and Wallachia | Russia | Moldavia Wallachia |
| 1852 invasion of Argentina | Brazil Uruguay Entre Rios Corrientes | Argentina |
| Manifest Destiny Invasion of the Western North America | United States | Native Americans |
| 1846 invasion of Mexico | United States | Mexico |
| 1841 invasion of Bolivia | Peru | Bolivia |
| 1841 invasion of Cambodia | Vietnam Siam | Cambodia |
| 1839 invasion of China | United Kingdom | China |
| 1838 invasion of Peru | Chile | Peru |
| 1837 invasion of Peru | Chile | Peru |
| 1835 invasion of Riograndense Republic | Brazil | Riograndese Republic |
| 1834 invasion of Ladakh | Sikh Empire: Jammu | Ladakh |
| 1832 invasion of Syria | Egypt | Ottoman Empire: Syria |
| 1832 invasion of Champa | Vietnam | Champa |
| 1831 invasion of Cambodia and southern Vietnam | Siam | Vietnam Cambodia |
| 1830 invasion of Algeria | France | Regency of Algiers |
| 1827 invasion of Laos | Siam | Kingdom of Vientiane |
| 1825 invasion of Greece | Egypt | Greece |
| 1817–21 invasions of Assam | Burma | Assum |
| 1812–16 invasions of the Banda Oriental | United Kingdom of Portugal, Brazil and the Algarves | Banda Oriental |
| 1814 invasion of the United States | British Empire: United Kingdom; Upper Canada; Lower Canada | United States |
| 1813 invasion of Canada | United States | British Empire: Upper Canada |
| 1812 invasions of Canada | United States | British Empire: Upper Canada; Lower Canada |
| 1812 invasions of United States | British Empire: United Kingdom; Upper Canada; Lower Canada; Native Americans | United States |
| 1812 invasion of Cambodia | Vietnam | Cambodia |
| 1809 invasion of Sweden | Russia | Sweden |
| 1808 invasion of Swedish Finland | Russia | (Sweden) Swedish Finland |
| 1806–1807 invasions of Spanish Río de la Plata basin colonies | United Kingdom | Spain: Viceroyalty of the Río de la Plata |
| 1805 invasion of Tripoli | United States | Ottoman Empire: Tripoli |

== French Revolutionary and Napoleonic Wars (1792–1815) ==
| Invasion | Invading forces | Defending forces |
|---|---|---|
| 1814 invasion of France | Russia; United Kingdom; Spain; Austria; Prussia; Portugal; Naples; Netherlands; Montenegro | France |
| 1813 invasion of Southern France | Spain; United Kingdom; Portugal | France |
| 1812 invasion of Russia | France; Austria; Prussia | Russia |
| 1811 invasion of Java | United Kingdom | France |
| 1810 invasion of Mauritius | United Kingdom | France |
| 1810 invasion of Portugal | France | Portugal; United Kingdom |
| 1810 invasion of Guadeloupe | United Kingdom | France |
| 1809 Invasion of Sweden | Russia | Sweden |
| 1809 invasion of Flanders | United Kingdom | France |
| 1809 invasion of Portugal | France | Portugal; United Kingdom |
| 1809 invasion of Martinique | United Kingdom | France |
| 1808 invasion of Spain | France | Spain |
| 1807 invasion of Portugal | France; Spain | Portugal |
| 1805 invasion of Bavaria | Austria | Bavaria |
| 1800 invasion of Piedmont | France | Piedmont |
| Anglo-Russian invasion of Holland (1799) | Great Britain; Russia | Holland; France |
| 1799 invasion of Ionian Islands | Russia; Ottoman Empire | France |
| 1798 invasion of Vietnam | France | Vietnam |
| 1798 invasion of Ireland | France | Ireland |
| 1798 invasion of Egypt | France | Ottoman Empire |
| 1798 invasion of Malta | France | (Sovereign Military Order of Malta) Order of St. John of Jerusalem |
| 1795 invasion of France | Great Britain | France |
| 1795 invasion of Ceylon | Great Britain | Batavian Republic |
| 1795 invasion of Bavaria | France | Bavaria |
| 1794 invasion of Holland | France | Dutch Republic |
| 1794 invasion of the Austrian Netherlands | France | Austria |
| 1793 invasion of the Kingdom of Sardinia | France | Sardinia |
| 1793 invasion of Breda | France | Breda |

== 1700–1792 ==
| Invasion | Invading forces | Defending forces |
|---|---|---|
| 1792 invasion of Poland | Russia | Poland |
| 1792 invasion of Laos | Siam | Laos |
| 1789 invasion of Vietnam | Manchu army | Vietnam |
| 1788 invasion of Nepal | China | Nepal |
| 1788 invasion of Vietnam | China | Vietnam |
| 1788 invasion of Tibet | Gorkha Kingdom | Tibet |
| 1788-1901 invasion of Australia | Britain | Aboriginal Australians and Torres Strait Islanders |
| 1784–1785 Battle of Rach Gam–Xoai Mut | Siam | Vietnam |
| 1783 Al Khalifa invasion of Bahrain | Al Khalifa | Bahrain |
| 1782 invasion of Cambodia | Siam | Cambodia |
| 1778 invasion of Laos | Siam | Laos |
| 1775 invasion of Canada | Thirteen Colonies (United States) | Canada |
| 1774 Tây Sơn Revolt | Vietnam | Annam |
| 1769 invasion of Cambodia | Siam | Cambodia |
| 1768 Invasion of Corsica | France | Corsica |
| 1765–1767 invasion of Siam | Burma | Siam |
| 1757 Battle of Prague | Prussia | Bohemia |
| 1756 invasion of Saxony | Prussia | Saxony |
| 1755 Wars over the south | Vietnam | Cochinchina |
| 1750 invasion of Tibet | China | Tibet |
| 1749 invasion of Cochinchina | Vietnam | Cochinchina |
| 1741 invasion of Spanish Cuba | England | Spanish Cuba |
| 1720 invasion of Tibet | China | Tibet |
| 1718 War of the Quadruple Alliance | Austria; Britain | Sicily |
| 1718 War of the Quadruple Alliance | Spain | Sicily |
| 1718 Great Northern War | Sweden | Norway |
| 1717 War of the Quadruple Alliance | Spain | (Kingdom of Sardinia) Sardinia |
| 1717 Tatar raids | Tatar | Transylvania |
| 1717 Omani invasion of Bahrain | Omani | Bahrain |
| 1716 Battle of Petrovaradin | Ottoman Empire | Austria |
| 1716 Great Northern War | Sweden | Norway |
| 1716 invasion of Venetian Corfu | Ottoman Turks | Corfu |
| 1714 Wars over the south | Vietnam | Cochinchina |
| 1719 invasion of Sweden | Russia | Sweden |
| 1707 invasion of Russia | Sweden | Russia |
| 1706 invasion of Saxony | Sweden | Saxony |
| 1705 invasion of Tibet | Mongols | Tibet |
| 1702 invasion of the Polish–Lithuanian Commonwealth | Sweden | Polish–Lithuanian Commonwealth |
| 1700 invasion of the Swedish Empire | Russia; Denmark–Norway; Polish–Lithuanian Commonwealth | Sweden |

== 1600–1699 ==
- 1694 invasion of Lan Xang by Vietnam
- 1693 invasion of Mongolia by China
- 1692 invasion of Kingdom of Champa by Vietnam
- 1688–1689 invasion of Britain by the Dutch Republic
- 1683 invasion of Kingdom of Tungning by the Qing dynasty
- 1683 invasion of Austria by Ottoman Empire
- 1677 invasion of Vietnam by a Mạc army
- 1674 invasion of Brandenburg by Sweden
- 1673 invasion of Poland by Ottoman Turks
- 1673-1677 invasion of Southern Africa by the Dutch Republic
- 1672 invasion of Dutch Republic by France with English support
- 1670–1671 invasion of Spanish Panama by the Welsh privateer Henry Morgan
- 1668 invasion of Spanish Panama by the Welsh privateer Morgan
- 1668 invasion of Spanish Cuba by the Welsh privateer Morgan
- 1664 invasion of Austria by Ottoman Empire
- 1662 invasion of Assam by Bengal
- 1661–1662 invasion of Dutch Formosa by the Ming loyalists
- 1655 invasion of western Polish–Lithuanian Commonwealth by Sweden
- 1654 invasion of eastern Polish–Lithuanian Commonwealth by Russia
- 1653 invasion of Kingdom of Champa by Vietnam
- 1650 invasion of Scotland by England
- 1649-1653 invasion of Ireland by England
- 1648-1669 invasion of Crete by Ottoman Empire
- 1644 invasion of the Ming dynasty by the Qing dynasty
- 1636 invasion of Korea by the Qing dynasty
- 1630 invasion of Germany by Sweden
- 1627 invasion of Iceland by Barbary pirates
- 1627 invasion of Korea by the Later Jin
- 1625 invasion of western England by Barbary pirates
- 1625 invasion of Ottoman Istanbul by Zaporozhian Cossacks
- 1621 invasion of Poland by Ottoman Turks
- 1609 invasion of Russia by the Polish–Lithuanian Commonwealth

== 1500–1599 ==
- 1596 invasion of Austria by the Ottoman Empire
- 1594 invasion of Cambodia by Siam
- 1592 invasion of Burma by Siam
- 1592–1598 invasion of Korea by Japan
- 1590–1592 invasion of Orissa by Mughal Empire
- 1589 invasion of Poland by the Crimean Khanate
- 1585–1589 invasion of Kashmir by the Mughal Empire
- 1585 invasion of Lanzarote of the Canary Islands by Barbary pirates
- 1578 invasion of Kingdom of Champa by Vietnam
- 1563–1569 invasion of Siam by Burma
- 1573 invasion of Venetian Corfu by Ottoman Turks
- 1572–1576 invasion of Bengal by Mughal Empire
- 1572–1573 invasion of Gujarat by Mughal Empire
- 1572 invasion of Spanish Nombre de Dios by the English privateer Drake
- 1571 invasion of Russia by Crimean Khanate
- 1571 invasion of Venetian Corfu by Ottoman Turks
- 1567–1568 invasion of Chittorgarh by Mughal Empire
- 1565 invasion of Malta by Ottoman Empire
- 1564–1567 invasion of Garha by Mughal Empire
- 1560–1570 invasion of Malwa by Mughal Empire
- 1552 invasion of Kazan Khanate by Russia
- 1551 invasion of Tripoli by Ottoman Empire
- 1551 invasion of Gozo by Ottoman Empire
- 1548–1549 invasion of Siam by Burma
- 1537 invasion of Venetian Corfu by Ottoman Turks
- 1537 invasion of Vietnam by a Ming army
- 1527–1543 invasion of Ethiopia by Adal Sultanate
- 1529 invasion of Austria by the Ottoman Empire
- 1526 invasion of Hungary by the Ottoman Empire
- 1522 invasion of Rhodes by the Ottoman Empire
- 1515 invasion of Duchy Of Milan by France
- 1513 invasion of Duchy Of Milan by Papal-hired Swiss mercenaries and Republic of Venice
- 1512 invasion of Spain by Barbary pirates
- 1506 invasion of Poland by Crimean Tatars

== 1300–1499 ==
- 1499 invasion of Duchy Of Milan by France
- 1492 invasion of the Americas by Spain
- 1492 invasion of Granada by Spain
- 1480 invasion of Rhodes by the Ottoman Empire
- 1478 invasion of Kingdom of Lan Xang by Vietnam
- 1471 invasion of Kingdom of Champa by Vietnam
- 1453 invasion of Byzantium by the Ottoman Empire
- 1446 invasion of Kingdom of Champa by Vietnam
- 1431 invasion of Venetian Corfu by Ottoman Turks
- 1429 invasion of Malta by the Hafsids
- 1427 invasion of Vietnam by a Ming army
- 1421 invasion of Egypt by the Kingdom of Cyprus
- 1415 invasion of France by the Kingdom of England.
- Turkoman invasions of Georgia 1407–1502
- 1407 invasion of Vietnam by China
- 1403 invasion of Venetian Corfu by the Republic of Genoa
- 1402 invasion of Kingdom of Champa by Vietnam
- 1389 invasion of Serbia by the Ottoman Empire
- 1389 invasion of Vietnam by the Kingdom of Champa
- 1385–1387 invasion of Caucasus and Northwest Iran by the Golden Horde
- 1382–1383 invasion of Russia by the Golden Horde
- 1377 invasion of Vietnam by the Kingdom of Champa
- 1372 invasion of Vietnam by the Kingdom of Champa
- 1361 invasion of Vietnam by the Kingdom of Champa
- 1333 invasion of Scotland by "The Disinherited" and England
- 1332 invasion of Scotland by "The Disinherited" from England
- 1312 invasion of Kingdom of Champa by Vietnam
- 1300 invasion of Flanders by France

=== Timurid invasions ===
- 1386–1403 Timur's invasions of Georgia
- 1400–1402 invasion of Iraq, Syria and Anatolia
- 1399 invasion of Ukraine
- 1398–1399 invasion of northern India
- 1394–1396 invasion of Golden Horde (second)
- 1389–1391 invasion of Golden Horde (first)
- 1380–1393 invasion of Persia
- 1370s invasion of Transoxiana and Khwarezm

== 1200–1299 ==
- 1297 invasion of Monaco by an Italian army
- 1296 invasion of Scotland by England
- 1291 invasion of Acre by the Mamluks
- 1268 invasion of Antioch by the Mamluks
- 1246 invasion of Thessaloniki by the Byzantine Empire
- 1224 invasion of the Kingdom of Thessaloniki by the Byzantine Despotate of Epirus
- 1218 invasion of Kingdom of Champa by Vietnam
- 1216 invasion of Kingdom of Champa by Vietnam
- 1204 invasion of Thessaloniki by the Fourth Crusade
- 1204 invasion of Constantinople by Venice and the Fourth Crusade
- 1203 invasion of Constantinople by Venice and the Fourth Crusade
- 1202 invasion of Hungary-Croatia by Venice and the Fourth Crusade

=== Mongol invasions ===
- 1299 invasion of Syria (third invasion)
- 1293 invasion of Java
- 1288 raid against Vietnam
- 1287 raid against Poland
- 1287 invasion of Vietnam (third attempt)
- 1285 raid against Bulgaria
- 1285 raid against Vietnam
- 1284–1285 invasion of Hungary
- 1284 invasion of Vietnam (second attempt)
- 1283 invasion of Kingdom of Champa
- 1281 invasion of Syria (second invasion)
- 1281 invasion of Japan
- 1279 invasion of Southern China
- 1277, 1287 invasion of Myanmar
- 1275 raid against Lithuania
- 1274 raid against Bulgaria
- 1274 invasion of Japan
- 1259 invasion of Syria (first invasion)
- 1259 raid against Lithuania and Poland
- 1258–1259 invasion of Halych-Volynia
- 1258 raid against Vietnam
- 1258 invasion of Baghdad
- 1257 invasion of Vietnam (first attempt)
- 1254 invasions of Korea (sixth campaign)
- 1251–1259 invasion of Persia, Syria and Mesopotamia (Timour)
- 1251 invasion of Korea (fifth campaign)
- 1247 invasion of Korea (fourth campaign)
- 1244 invasion of Anatolia
- 1242 invasion of Serbia, Bulgaria, Wallachia
- 1241 invasion of Poland, Lithuania, Hungary, Bohemia, Austria
- 1240 Mongol invasions of Tibet
- 1240 invasion of Ukraine
- 1237–1238 invasion of Russia
- 1235 invasion of Korea (third campaign)
- 1232 invasion of Korea (second campaign)
- 1231 invasion of Korea (first campaign)
- 1222, 1241, 1257, 1292, 1298, 1306, 1327 invasion of India
- 1220–1224 invasion of Georgians and the Cumans of the Caucasus, the Kuban, Astrakhan, Russia, Ukraine
- 1218–1220 invasion of Khwarizm (Iran)
- 1211–1234 invasion of Northern China
- 1205–1209 invasion of Western China

== 900–1199 AD ==
- 1195 invasion of Spain by Almohads
- 1191 invasion of Jaffa by England (Third Crusade)
- 1191 invasion of Acre by France, Conrad of Montferrat and England (Third Crusade)
- 1191 invasion of Cyprus by England (Third Crusade)
- 1189 invasion of Iconium by the Holy Roman Empire (Third Crusade)
- 1189 invasion of Kingdom of Jerusalem by Ayyubids (Egypt)
- 1177 invasion of Angkor by Rival Chams based in Central Vietnam
- 1171, 1173, 1177, 1183, 1187 invasion of Kingdom of Jerusalem by Ayyubids (Egypt)
- 1169 Invasion of Ireland by the Anglo-Normans
- 1167 invasion of Kingdom of Champa by Vietnam
- 1163, 1164, 1167, 1168 invasion of Egypt by Kingdom of Jerusalem
- 1161–1165 invasion of the Southern Song dynasty by the Jin dynasty
- 1132 invasion of Kingdom of Champa by Vietnam
- 1128 invasion of Vietnam by Kingdom of Champa
- 1125–1142 invasion of the Northern Song dynasty by the Jin dynasty
- 1115–1118 invasion of Egypt by Kingdom of Jerusalem
- 1113 invasion of Kingdom of Jerusalem by Seljuk Turks
- 1110 invasion of Kalinga by Chola
- 1104 invasion of Kingdom of Champa by Vietnam
- 1102,1103,1105 invasion of Kingdom of Jerusalem by Egypt
- 1099 invasion of Jerusalem by the First Crusade
- 1097–1098 invasion of Antioch by the First Crusade
- 1097 invasion of Kalinga by Chola
- 1091 invasion of Malta by the Normans
- 1091 invasion of Byzantine Empire by Petchenegs
- 1086 Invasion of Spain by Almoravids
- 1085 invasion of Antioch by the Seljuk Turks
- 1080s invasions of the Georgian Kingdom by the Seljuk Turks
- 1075 invasion of China by Vietnam
- 1074–1075 invasion of Kingdom of Champa by Vietnam
- 1071 invasion of Byzantine Empire by Seljuk Turks
- 1069 invasion of Kingdom of Champa by Vietnam
- 1068 invasion of Egypt by the Seljuk Turks
- 1066 invasion of England by Norwegian and Norman forces
- 1053–54 invasion of Malta by the Byzantine Empire
- 1044 invasion of Kingdom of Champa by Vietnam
- 1043 invasion of Kingdom of Champa by Vietnam
- 1028–1029 invasion of Norway by Canute the Great from Anglo-Saxon England
- 1025 invasion of Srivijaya by Chola
- 1020 invasion of Kingdom of Champa by Vietnam
- 1019 invasion of Kyushu, Japan by Jurchen pirates
- 1018 invasion of Lanka (Sri Lanka) by Chola
- 1015–1016 invasion of Anglo-Saxon England by Danish, Norwegian, Jomsviking and Polish forces led by Canute the Great
- 1000 invasion of North America by Vikings
- 993–1019 invasion of Korea by Khitan
- 982 invasion of Kingdom of Champa by Vietnam
- 981 invasion of Vietnam by Song forces
- 969 invasion of Antioch by the Byzantine Empire
- 968 invasion of Kievan Rus by Petchenegs
- 955 invasion of Germany by Magyars
- 938 invasion of Vietnam by Southern Han forces
- 919–921 Second Fatimid invasion of Egypt
- 914–915 First Fatimid invasion of Egypt

== Before 900 AD ==
- 870 invasion of Malta by the Aghlabids
- 793 invasion of BritainLindisfarne by Vikings
- 782 Abbasid invasion of Asia Minor by Arabs
- 772 invasion of Saxony by Charlemagne
- 763 invasion of Tang China by Tibetans
- 732 invasion of France by Arabs
- 718 invasion of Byzantine Empire by Arabs
- 711–718 invasion of Visigothic Hispania by a Moorish army of the second caliphate
- 657 invasion of the Western Turkic Khaganate by China
- 648 invasion of Karasahr by the Tang dynasty
- 645–668 invasion of Korea by the Tang dynasty
- 644 invasion of Karasahr by the Tang dynasty
- 642–711 invasion of Algeria by the Umayyads
- 640 invasion of Karakhoja by the Tang dynasty
- 639–640 invasion of the Eastern Turkic Khaganate by China
- 639–641 invasion of Egypt by the second caliphate
- 636 invasion of Antioch by the second caliphate
- 633–651 invasion of Sasanian Empire by the first caliphate
- 602 invasion of Vietnam by a Sui army
- 600 invasion of Antioch by the Byzantine Empire
- 586 invasion of Byzantine Empire by Persia
- 598–614 invasion of Korea by China
- 544 invasion of Vietnam by Chen Baxian
- 543 invasion of Vietnam by Kingdom of Champa
- 543 Roman invasion of Persarmenia by the Byzantine Empire
- 540 invasion of Antioch by the Sasanid Empire
- 520 or 525 invasion of Yemen by Ethiopia (Kingdom of Aksum)
- 440 Huns invade the Eastern Roman Empire
- 429 invasion of the Iberian peninsula by the Visigoths
- 409 invasion of the Iberian peninsula by Vandals and Alans
- 409 invasion of the NW of the Iberian peninsula by Suebians
- 406 invasion of Gallia by Vandals, Alans and Suebians
- 363 invasion of Persia by the Roman Empire
- 349 invasion of Meroe by Ethiopia (Kingdom of Aksum)
- 249 invasion of Roman Empire by Persia
- 43 AD invasion of Vietnam by a Han army
- 43 AD invasion of Britain by the Roman Empire
- 56 and 55 BC invasions of Britain by the Roman Republic
- 58 and 57 BC invasions of France (Gaul) by the Roman Republic
- 65 BC invasion of Georgia (Colchis and Iberia) by the Roman Republic
- 111 BC invasion of Vietnam by a Han army
- 121 BC invasion of France (Celtic Gaul) by the Roman Republic
- 149 BC invasion of Carthago by the Roman Republic
- 208 BC invasion of Vietnam by China
- 218 BC invasion of Vietnam by a Qin army
- 219 BC invasion of Lusitania by the Roman Republic
- 221 BC invasion of Vietnam by Qin Shi Huang
- 228 BC invasion of Mesopotamia by Ardashir I
- 258 BC invasion of Vietnam by Âu Việt tribe led by Thục Phán
- 279 BC invasion of Balkans by Gauls
- Approximately between 18th–13th century BC invasion of Canaan by Joshua and the Israelites
- Approximately between 22nd–21st century BC invasion of Vietnam by Ân tribes.

=== Peloponnesian War ===
431–404 BC multiple invasions of Athens and allies by Sparta and allies; multiple invasions of Spartan allies by Athens and allies

=== Persian invasions of Greece ===
- 480–479 BCE Second Persian invasion of Greece
- 492–490 BCE First Persian invasion of Greece

== See also ==
- List of coups and coup attempts
- List of revolutions and rebellions
