= List of wars involving Malta =

This article is a list of wars and battles involving Malta.

== Medieval period (before 1530) ==
Dates	Name of Conflict	Belligerents		Outcome
Dates	Name of Conflict	Allies	Enemies	Outcome
870	Siege of Melite part of the Arab–Byzantine wars	Byzantine Empire	Aghlabids	Aghlabid victory
1053–1054	Siege of Medina part of the Arab–Byzantine wars	Arabs	Byzantine Empire	Arab victory
1091	Norman invasion of Malta part of the Norman conquest of southern Italy	Arabs	Norman County of Sicily	Norman victory
1283	Battle of Malta part of the War of the Sicilian Vespers	Aragonese Kingdom of Sicily	Angevin Kingdom of Sicily	Aragonese victory
1429	Siege of Malta	Kingdom of Sicily; Maltese civilians	Hafsid Kingdom	Maltese victory

== Order of Saint John (1530–1798) ==
Dates	Name of Conflict	Belligerents		Outcome
Dates	Name of Conflict	Allies	Enemies	Outcome
1535	Conquest of Tunis part of the Spanish–Ottoman wars, the Ottoman–Habsburg wars and the Ottoman–Portuguese conflicts	Spanish Empire; Kingdom of Naples; Kingdom of Sicily; Holy Roman Empire; County of Flanders; Kingdom of Portugal; Papal States; Republic of Genoa; Knights of Malta	Ottoman Empire	Habsburg and allied victory: Muley Hassan of the Hafsid dynasty restored as client ruler of Tunis and Spanish-Imperial tributary.
1538	Battle of Preveza part of the Third Ottoman–Venetian War	Holy League: Venice; Papal States; Genoa; Spain; Mantua; Malta	Ottoman Empire	Ottoman victory
1541	Expedition against Algiers part of the Spanish–Ottoman wars and the Ottoman–Habsburg wars	Empire of Charles V: Holy Roman Empire; Spain; (Kingdom of Naples) Naples; Sicily; (Sovereign Military Order of Malta) Order of Saint John; Republic of Genoa; Papal States; Kingdom of Kuku	Regency of Algiers	Algerian victory
1551	Invasion of Gozo part of the Ottoman–Habsburg wars	(Sovereign Military Order of Malta) Hospitaller Malta	Ottoman Empire	Ottoman victory
1551	Siege of Tripoli part of the Ottoman-Habsburg wars and the Italian War of 1551–1559	(Sovereign Military Order of Malta) Hospitaller Tripoli	Ottoman Empire	Ottoman victory: Establishment of Ottoman Tripolitania
1560	Battle of Djerba part of the Ottoman–Habsburg wars	Republic of Genoa; Republic of Venice; Spain; Papal States; Duchy of Savoy (Sovereign Military Order of Malta) Order of Saint John	Ottoman Empire	Ottoman victory
1565	Great Siege of Malta part of the Ottoman–Habsburg wars	(Sovereign Military Order of Malta) Order of Saint John; Kingdom of Spain; Kingdom of Sicily	Ottoman Empire	Allied victory
1571	Battle of Lepanto part of the Ottoman–Habsburg and Ottoman–Venetian Wars	Holy League: Republic of Venice; (Spain) Spanish Empire (with Naples and Sicily); Republic of Genoa; Papal States; Grand Duchy of Tuscany; Duchy of Savoy; Duchy of Urbino; (Sovereign Military Order of Malta) Order of Saint John	Ottoman Empire	Allied Victory
1586	Battle of Pantelleria part of the Anglo-Spanish War	(Spain) Spanish Empire (Sovereign Military Order of Malta) Order of Saint John	Kingdom of England	English victory
1614	Raid of Żejtun part of the Ottoman–Habsburg wars	(Sovereign Military Order of Malta) Order of Saint John	Ottoman Empire	Maltese victory
1645–1669	War of Candia part of the Ottoman–Venetian Wars	Republic of Venice (Sovereign Military Order of Malta) Order of Saint John; Papal States; France; Maniots	Ottoman Empire	Ottoman victory
1684–1699	Morean War part of the Ottoman–Venetian Wars	Republic of Venice (Sovereign Military Order of Malta) Order of Saint John; Duchy of Savoy; Papal States; Knights of St. Stephen; Himariotes; Maniots; Greek rebels	Ottoman Empire	Allied victory
1714–1718	War of Corfu part of the Ottoman–Venetian Wars	Republic of Venice (Habsburg monarchy) Austria; Portugal (Sovereign Military Order of Malta) Order of Saint John; Papal States; Spain; Himariotes	Ottoman Empire	Allied victory
1784	Bombardment of Algiers part of the Spanish–Algerian War	Spain; Kingdom of Sicily; Order of Malta; Kingdom of Naples; Kingdom of Portugal	Regency of Algiers	Algerian victory
1798	French invasion of Malta part of the Mediterranean campaign of 1798	Hospitaller Malta	France	French victory: French occupation of Malta

== French occupation (1798–1800) ==
Dates	Name of Conflict	Belligerents		Outcome
Dates	Name of Conflict	Allies	Enemies	Outcome
1798–1800	Siege of Malta part of the War of the Second Coalition	Maltese insurgents Great Britain; Portugal	France	Allied victory: Establishment of the Malta Protectorate

== British protectorate and colony (1800–1964) ==
Dates	Name of Conflict	Belligerents		Outcome
Dates	Name of Conflict	Allies	Enemies	Outcome
1940–1942	Siege of Malta part of the Mediterranean and Middle East theatre of the Second World War	United Kingdom: Malta; Southern Rhodesia; Canada; South Africa; Australia; New Zealand; Naval support: Free France; Greece; Poland; Norway; United States	Italy; Germany	Allied victory

== Republic of Malta (1964–present) ==
Dates	Name of Conflict	Belligerents		Outcome
Dates	Name of Conflict	Allies	Enemies	Outcome
2008–present	Operation Atalanta part of the counter-piracy efforts off the Horn of Africa	List: European Union; Austria; Belgium; Bulgaria; Croatia; Cyprus; Czech Republic; Denmark; Estonia; Finland; France; Germany; Greece; Hungary; Ireland; Italy; Latvia; Lithuania; Luxembourg; Netherlands; Malta; Poland; Portugal; Romania; Slovakia; Slovenia; Spain; Sweden; Colombia; Iceland; Liechtenstein; Montenegro; New Zealand; Norway; Serbia; Switzerland; United Kingdom	Somali pirates	Ongoing

== See also ==
- History of Malta
