= Fortifications of Mdina =

Defensive walls in Mdina, Malta

- Is-Swar tal-Imdina
- Mdina, Malta (Note: The walls of ancient Melite extended into modern Rabat.)
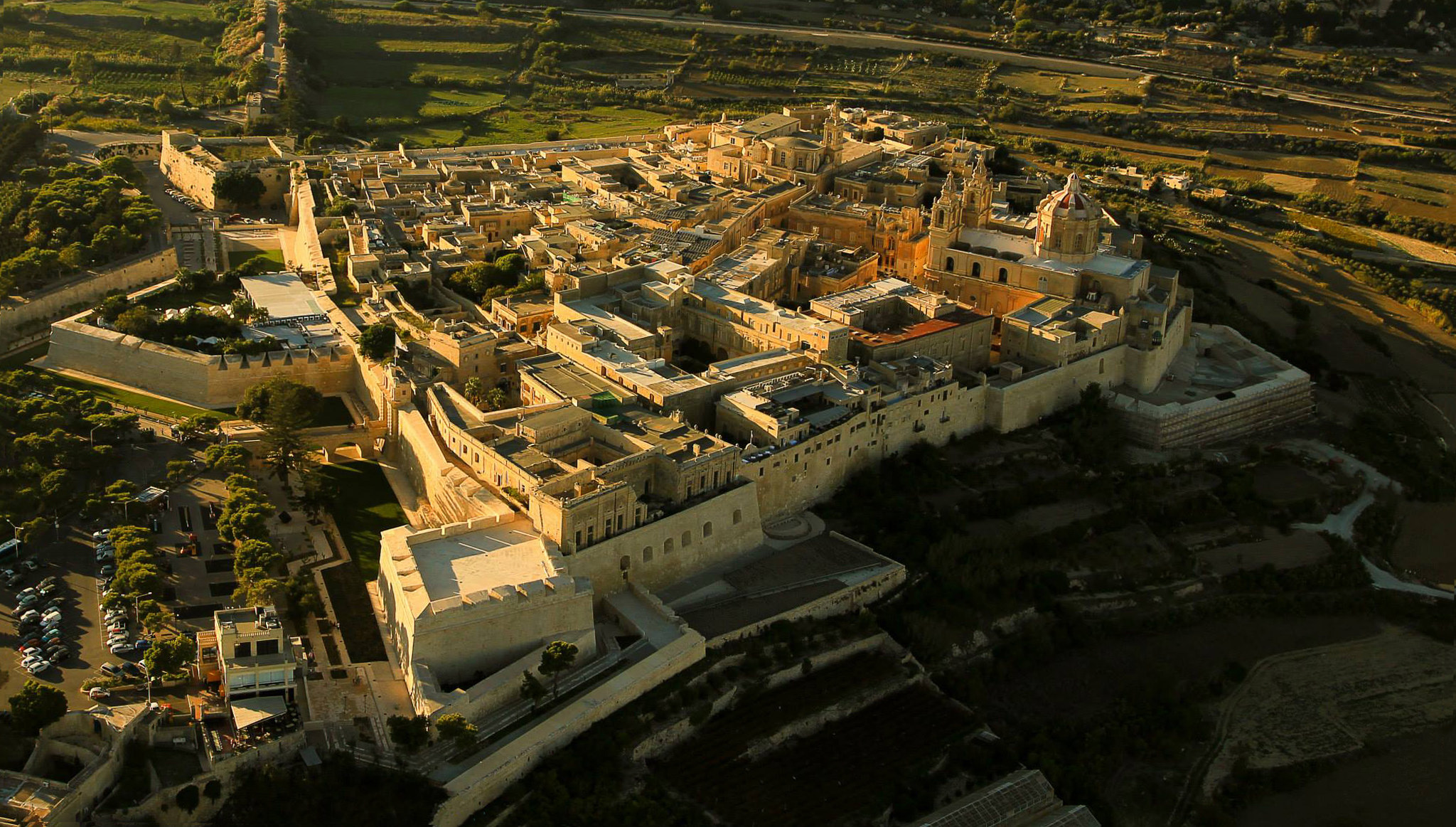
- Aerial view of Mdina and its fortifications

Site information
- Type: City wall
- Owner: Government of Malta; Various private owners
- Condition: Intact

Location
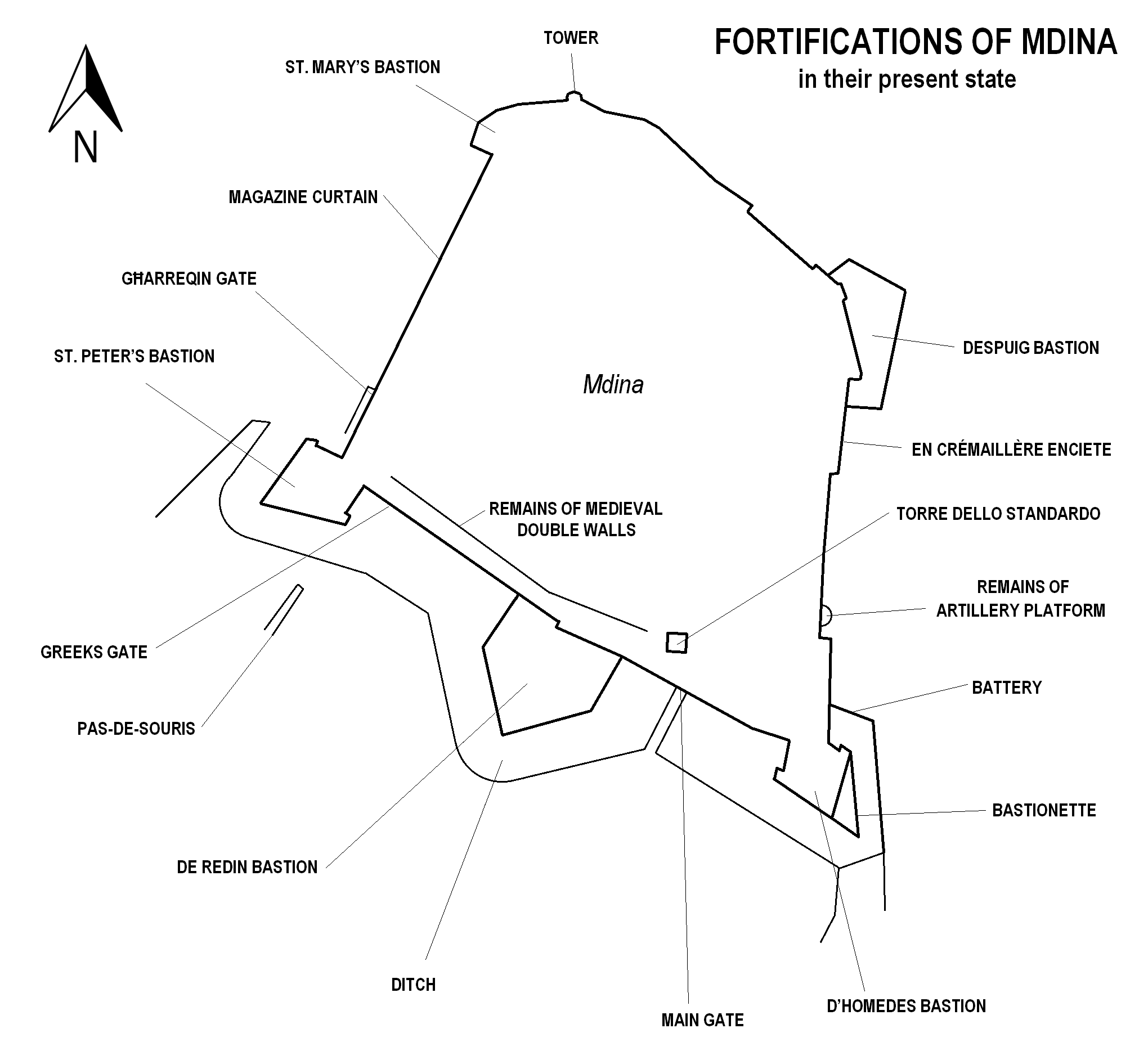
- Map of Mdina's fortifications as they are today
- Location within Malta
- Coordinates: 35°53′4.4″N 14°24′8.6″E

Site history
- Built: Antiquity–1746
- Built by: Several builders, most of the present walls were built by the Order of Saint John
- Materials: Limestone
- Battles/wars: Siege of Melite (870); Siege of Medina (1053–54); Norman invasion of Malta (1091); Siege of Malta (1429); Attack of 1551; Great Siege of Malta (1565); French invasion of Malta (1798); Maltese uprising (1798)

Garrison information
- Past commanders: Amros (Ambrosios) (870); Nicolas Durand de Villegaignon (1551); Pietro Mesquita (1565); Louis Masson (1798)

The fortifications of Mdina (Maltese: Is-Swar tal-Imdina) are a series of defensive walls which surround Mdina, the capital city of Malta from antiquity to the medieval period. The city was founded as Maleth by the Phoenicians in around the 8th century BC, and it later became part of the Roman Empire under the name Melite. The ancient city was surrounded by walls, but very few remains of these have survived.

The city walls were rebuilt a number of times, including by the Byzantine Empire in around the 8th century AD, the Arabs in around the 11th century, and the Kingdom of Sicily in the medieval period until the 15th century. Most of the extant fortifications were built by the Order of Saint John between the 16th and 18th centuries.

The city has withstood a number of sieges, and it was defeated twice – first by the Aghlabids in 870 and then by Maltese rebels in 1798. Today, the city walls are still intact except for some outworks, and they are among the best preserved fortifications in Malta. Mdina has been on Malta's tentative list of UNESCO World Heritage Sites since 1998.

== Punic-Roman walls ==
The city of Mdina occupies the tip of a plateau located on high ground in the northern part of the island of Malta, far away from the sea. The site has been inhabited since prehistory, and, by the Bronze Age, it was a place of refuge since it was naturally defensible. The Phoenicians colonized Malta in around the 8th century BC, and founded the city of Maleth on this plateau. It was taken over by the Roman Republic in 218 BC, becoming known as Melite. The Punic-Roman city was about three times the size of present-day Mdina, extending into a large part of modern Rabat. Melite's walls had a thickness of around 5 m (16 ft) and were surrounded by a 700 m (2,300 ft)-long ditch.

Very little of the Punic-Roman walls of Melite still survive. The remains of a city gate or tower were discovered in Saqqajja in modern Rabat, about 5 m (16 ft) below the current street level. Parts of the ditch have survived under present-day St. Rita Street and the Church of St. Paul. The lower foundations of some Punic-Roman ramparts, consisting of rusticated ashlar blocks three courses high still in situ, were found near the Magazine Curtain in the western part of Mdina. The only other remains of the ancient walls are Punic-Roman masonry blocks which were reused in the medieval period. These include a wall around Greeks Gate, and some stones which were discovered in excavations at Inguanez Street and the Xara Palace.

== Medieval walls ==
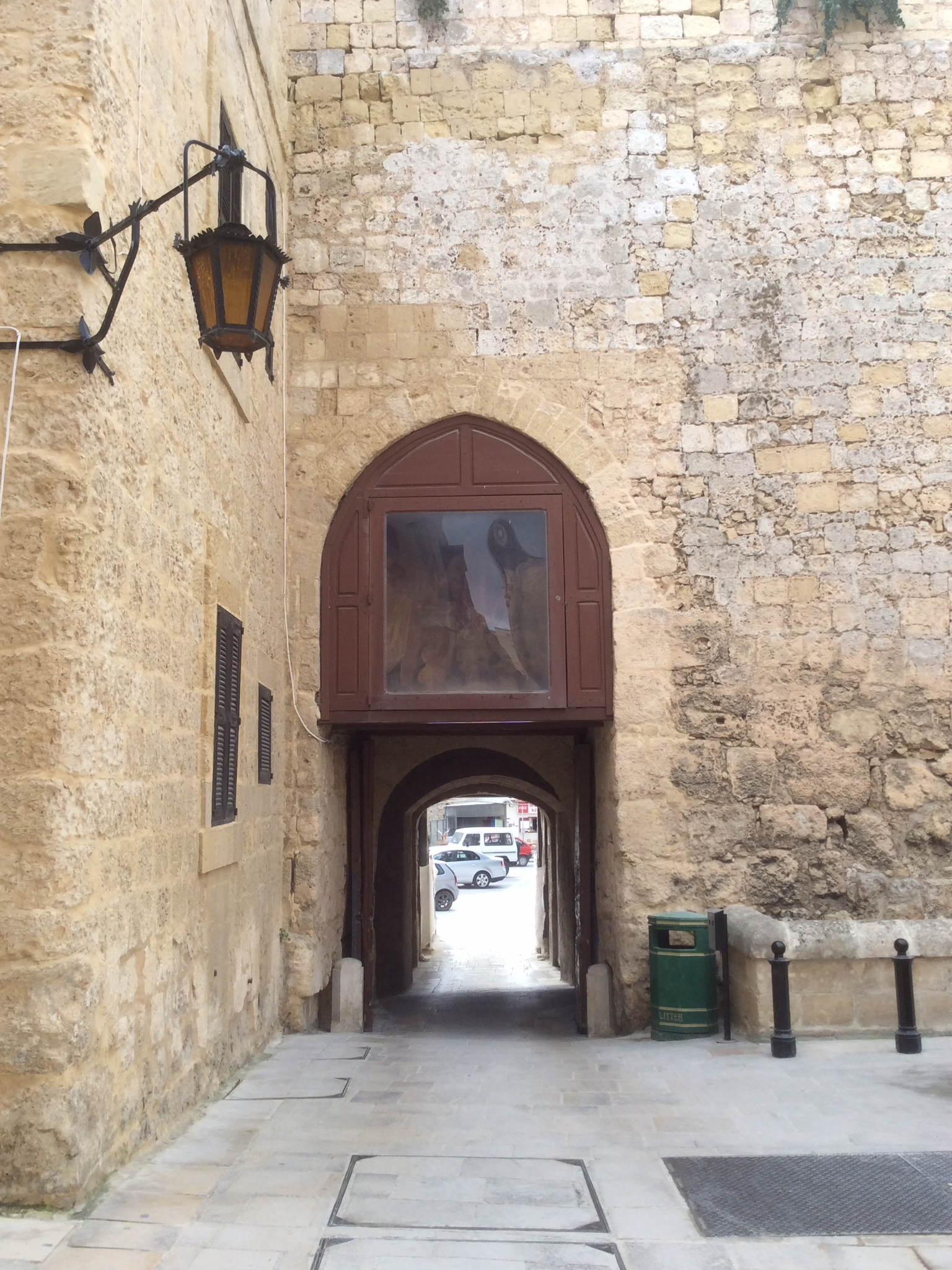
The inner portal of Greeks Gate, one of the few visible remains of the medieval walls

At some point following the fall of the Western Roman Empire, a retrenchment was built within the city, reducing it to its present size. This was done to make the city's perimeter more easily defensible, and similar reductions in city sizes were common around the Mediterranean region in the early Middle Ages. Although it was traditionally assumed that the retrenchment was built by the Arabs, it has been suggested that it was actually built by the Byzantine Empire in around the 8th century, when the threat from the Arabs increased.

In 870, Melite was captured by the Aghlabids, who massacred its inhabitants and "demolished its fortress" according to the chronicler Al-Himyarī. This account further mentions that Malta remained almost uninhabited until it was resettled in around 1048 or 1049 by a Muslim community and their slaves, who built a settlement called Medina on the site of Melite. Archaeological evidence suggests that the city was already a thriving Muslim settlement by the beginning of the 11th century, so 1048–49 might be the date when the city was officially founded and its walls were constructed. The Byzantines besieged Medina in 1053–54, but were repelled by its defenders.

Medina surrendered peacefully to Roger I of Sicily after a short siege in 1091, and Malta was subsequently incorporated into the County and later the Kingdom of Sicily, being dominated by a succession of feudal lords. The fortifications of Mdina were rebuilt and modified a number of times over the following centuries. A castle, known as the Castellu di la Chitati or the castrum civitas, was built on the southeast corner of the city near the main entrance, probably on the site of an earlier Byzantine fort. The city withstood a siege by Hafsid invaders in 1429.

By the 15th century, most of Mdina's enceinte had a system of double walls. The land front was flanked by four towers, one near Greeks Gate, another at the centre of the land front, the Turri Mastra (also known as Turri di la bandiera) near the main entrance and the Turri di la Camera at the southeast corner of the city. A barbican was built near Mdina's main entrance sometime after 1448. In the 1450s, there were fears of a Barbary or Ottoman attack, so efforts were made to improve Mdina's walls. The main ditch was completed, and the Castellu di la Chitati was partially demolished by royal licence in 1453, due to its ruinous state and the excessive cost for its upkeep.

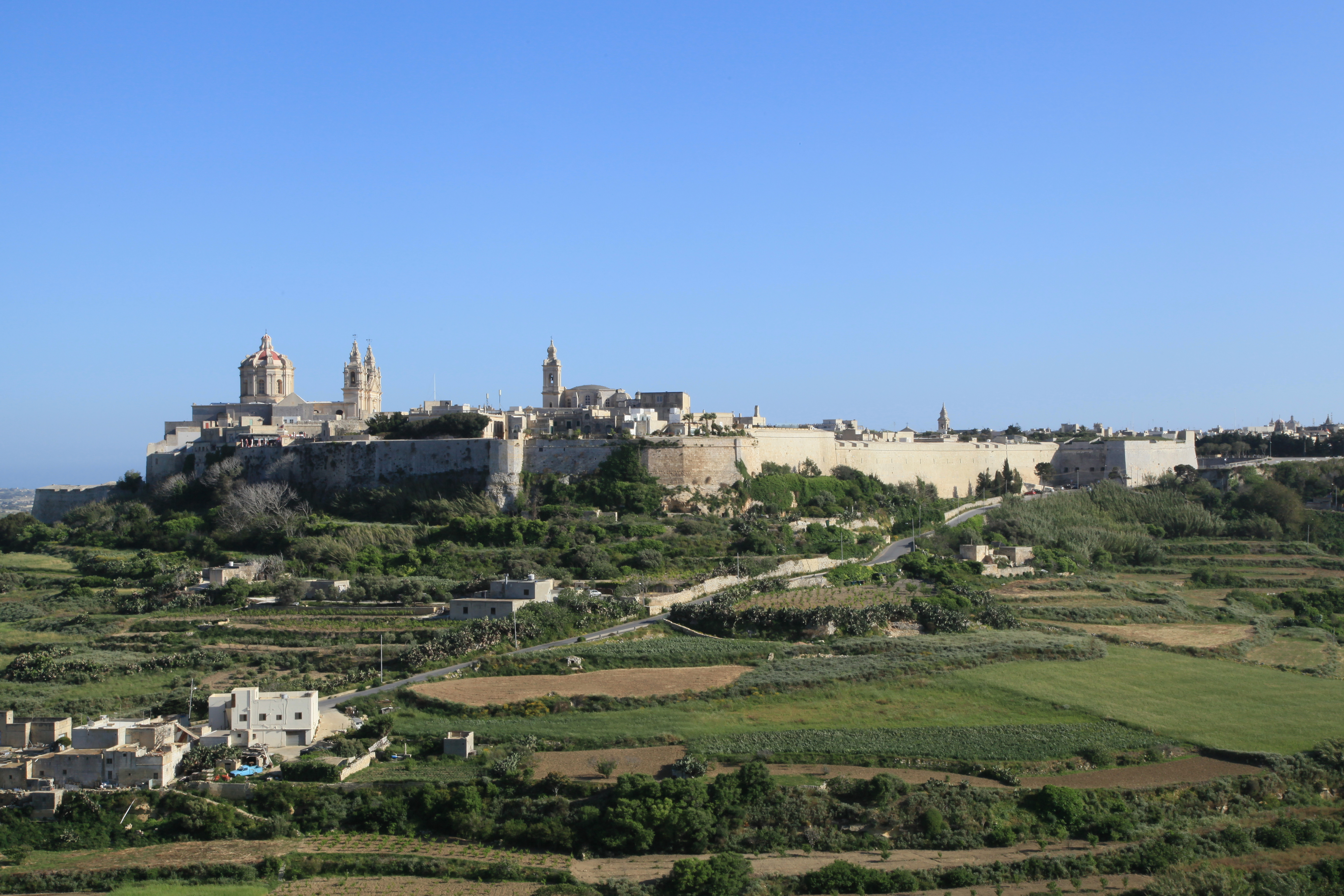
Mdina as seen from Mtarfa

By 1474, cannons had been introduced in Mdina. Other extensive preparations for an attack were made in the 1480s, when the fortifications were once again improved under the direction of Sicilian military engineers. At this point, some buildings in Rabat were demolished to clear the fortifications' line of fire. By 1522, the fortifications were being modernized with the construction of embrasures. However, the walls were still regarded as obsolete, since they lacked bastions and could not resist bombardment from modern artillery.

Most of the medieval walls of Mdina were gradually dismantled between the 1530s and 1720s, when the city's fortifications were being upgraded by the Hospitallers. One of the most significant visible remnants of the medieval fortifications is the Greeks Gate and the surrounding curtain walls, which still retains its medieval form, apart from the outer portal which was built in the 18th century. Parts of the double walls, including the remains of two gun loops, still stand between the gate and the Torre dello Standardo. Most of the northern and eastern walls date back to the medieval period, although some sections were rebuilt by the Hospitallers. The northern ramparts contain a medieval wall tower, while the remains of Byzantine antemurals and the foundations of a late 15th-century artillery platform have been found in the eastern walls.

== Hospitaller walls ==
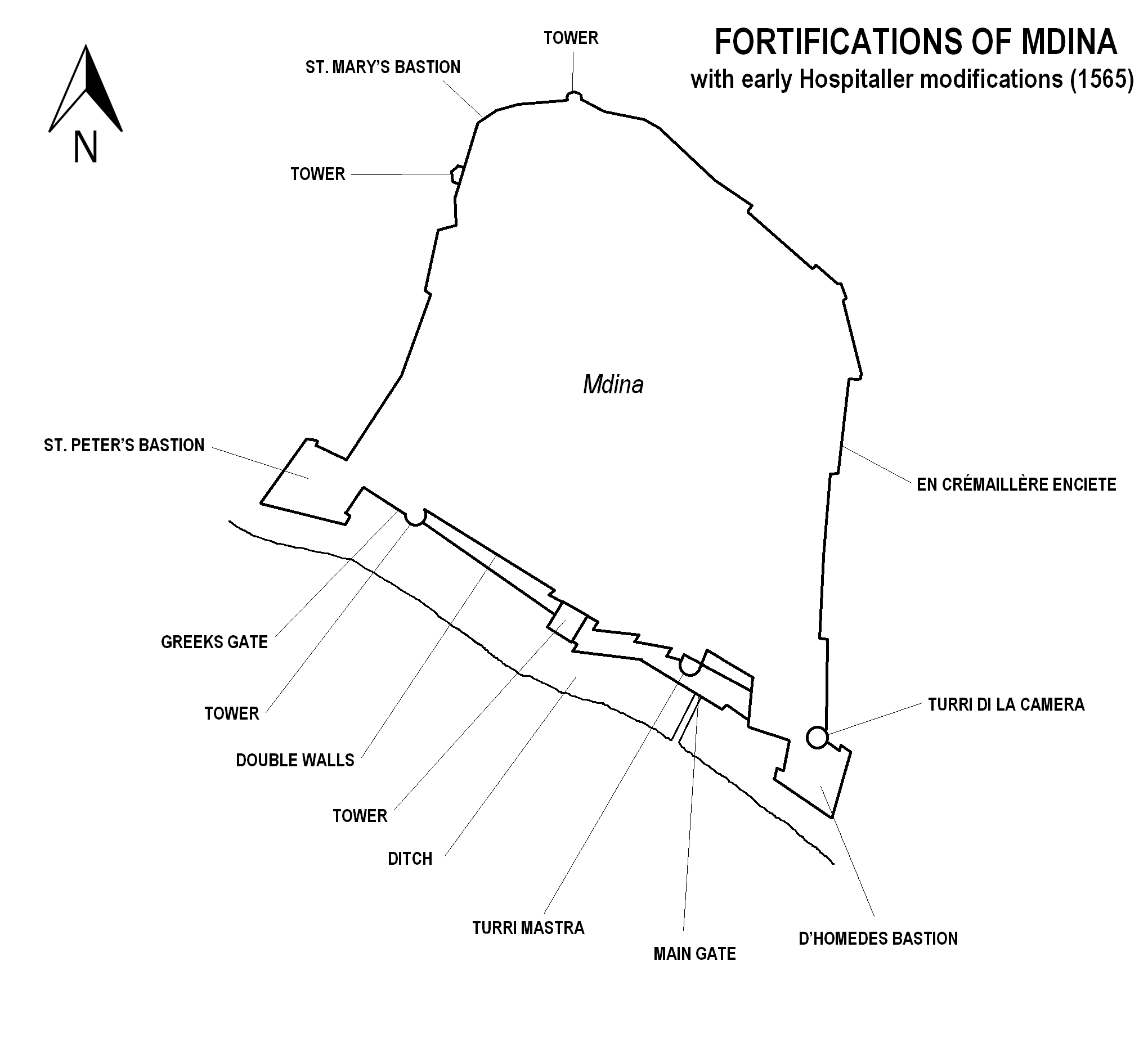
Map of Mdina's fortifications as they were during the Great Siege of Malta in 1565

When the Order of Saint John took over in Malta in 1530, the nobles ceremoniously handed over the keys of the city to Grand Master Philippe Villiers de L'Isle-Adam. The Order settled in Birgu and Mdina lost its status as capital city, but L'Isle-Adam built a palace on the remaining part of the Castellu di la Chitati, which became the meeting place of the civil administrative council known as the Università.

The first major upgrade of Mdina's fortifications occurred in the 1540s, during the magistracy of Juan de Homedes y Coscon. Two new bastions were built at the extremities of the land front, possibly to the designs of the military engineer Antonio Ferramolino, called St. Peter Bastion and St. Paul Bastion. Parts of the eastern walls were also rebuilt en crémaillère, the only instance of this style in Malta. The 15th-century barbican in front of the main gate was demolished in 1551, since it obstructed the line of fire of the newly built bastions. That year, the city withstood a brief Ottoman attack.

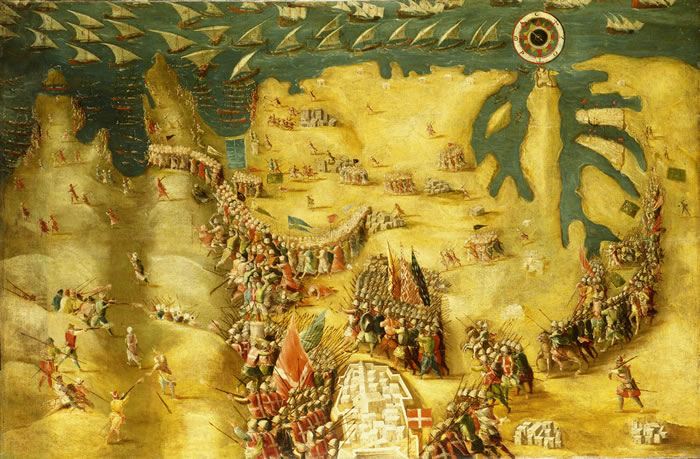
Painting of the Great Siege of Malta with Mdina at the bottom

Mdina was not attacked directly during the Great Siege of Malta of 1565, but it nonetheless played a crucial role in the siege. Ottoman general Mustafa Pasha wanted to take over the poorly defended city first, but was overruled by Piali Pasha who wanted to attack Fort Saint Elmo. The fort was taken over after a month of heavy fighting, but the Ottomans had lost crucial time in doing so. On 7 August, the Order's cavalry in Mdina attacked the unprotected Ottoman field hospital, which led to the invaders abandoning their major assault on the main fortifications in Birgu and Senglea. The Ottomans tried to take over the city in September so as to winter there, but abandoned their plans when Mdina fired its cannon, leading them to believe that the city had ammunition to spare.

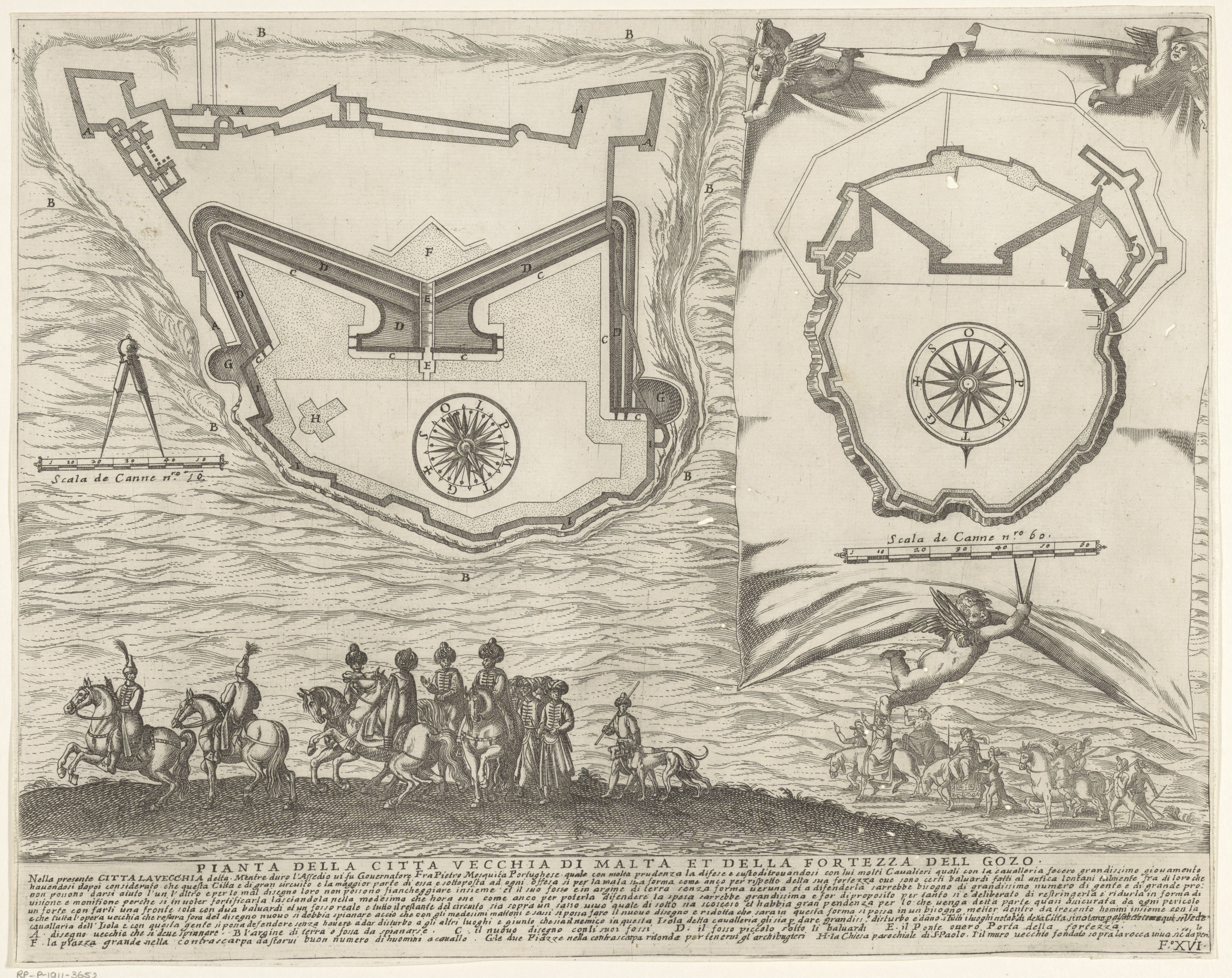
The plan on the left shows the proposal to reduce Mdina's size by half, with the proposal being overlaid on a plan of the city's existing fortifications. The plan on the right shows a similar proposal to modernize Gozo's Cittadella.

After the siege, Maltese military engineer Girolamo Cassar drew up plans to reduce Mdina's size by half and turn it into a fortress, but these were never implemented due to protests by the city's nobles. The city's main gate was reconstructed in the early 17th century, but the next major alterations were not made until the 1650s, when the large De Redin Bastion was built at the centre of the land front. Despite these modifications, by 1658, there were also proposals to abandon or demolish the entire fortress due to its state of disrepair, although these plans were opposed by the locals. In the late 17th century, some of Mdina's medieval double walls began to be encased in sloping ramparts.

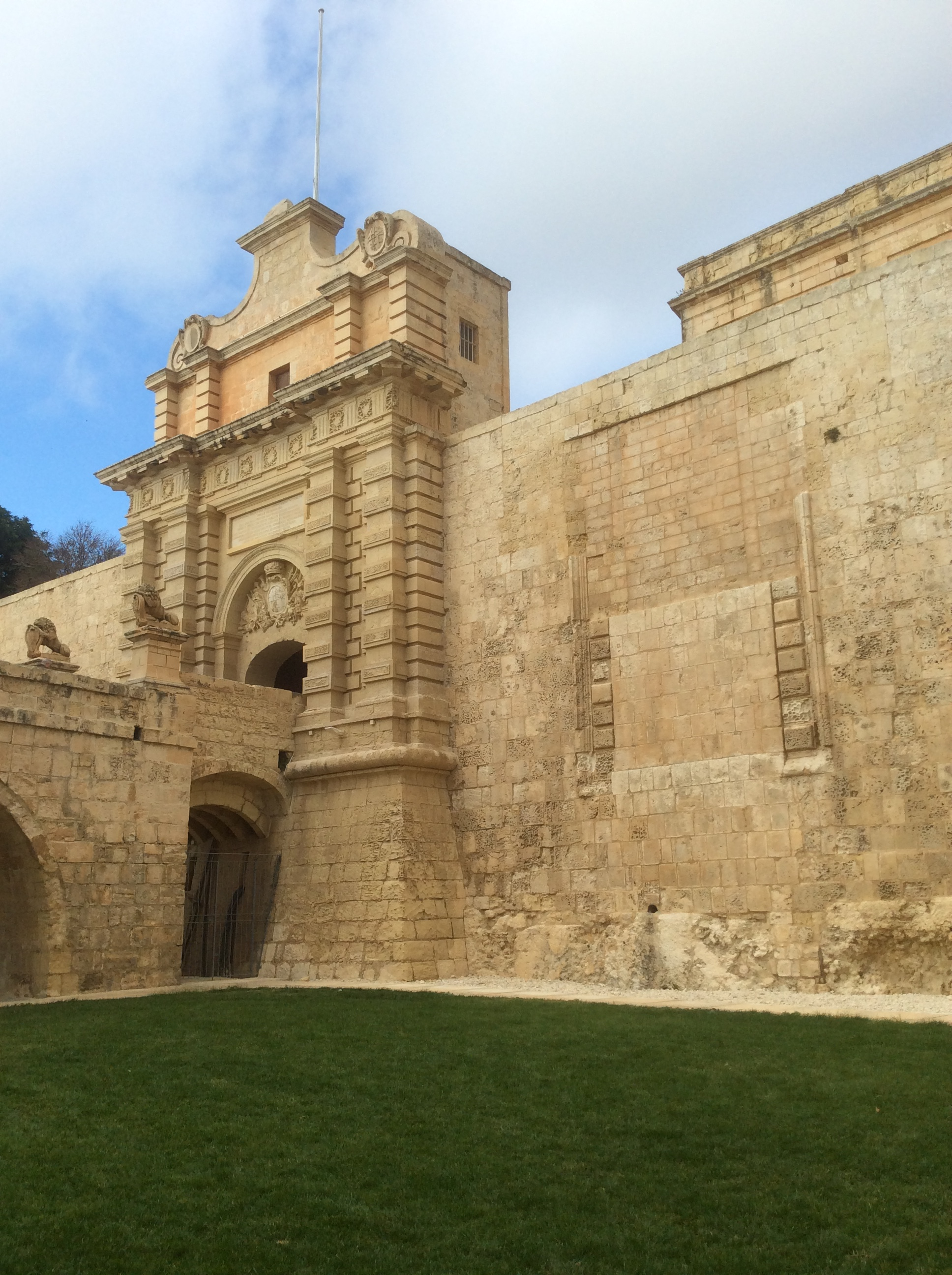
The 18th-century Mdina Gate and the walled-up medieval entrance

A major restoration of Mdina's fortifications was undertaken in the 1720s by the French military engineer Charles François de Mondion, during the magistracy of António Manoel de Vilhena. L'Isle-Adam's palace, including the remaining parts of the Castellu di la Chitati, were demolished to make way for Palazzo Vilhena. The main gate was walled up, a new city gate was built in the Baroque style and a Baroque portal was added to the Greeks Gate. The remaining medieval towers in the land front were demolished and the Torre dello Standardo was built on the site of the Turri Mastra, while the entire western walls of the city were demolished to make way for a single casemated curtain wall known as Magazine Curtain. D'Homedes Bastion was modified with the addition of a bastionette, while traverse-like batteries were built at the extremities of the land front. The city was further protected with the construction of outworks, including a covertway, two places-of-arms and a glacis.

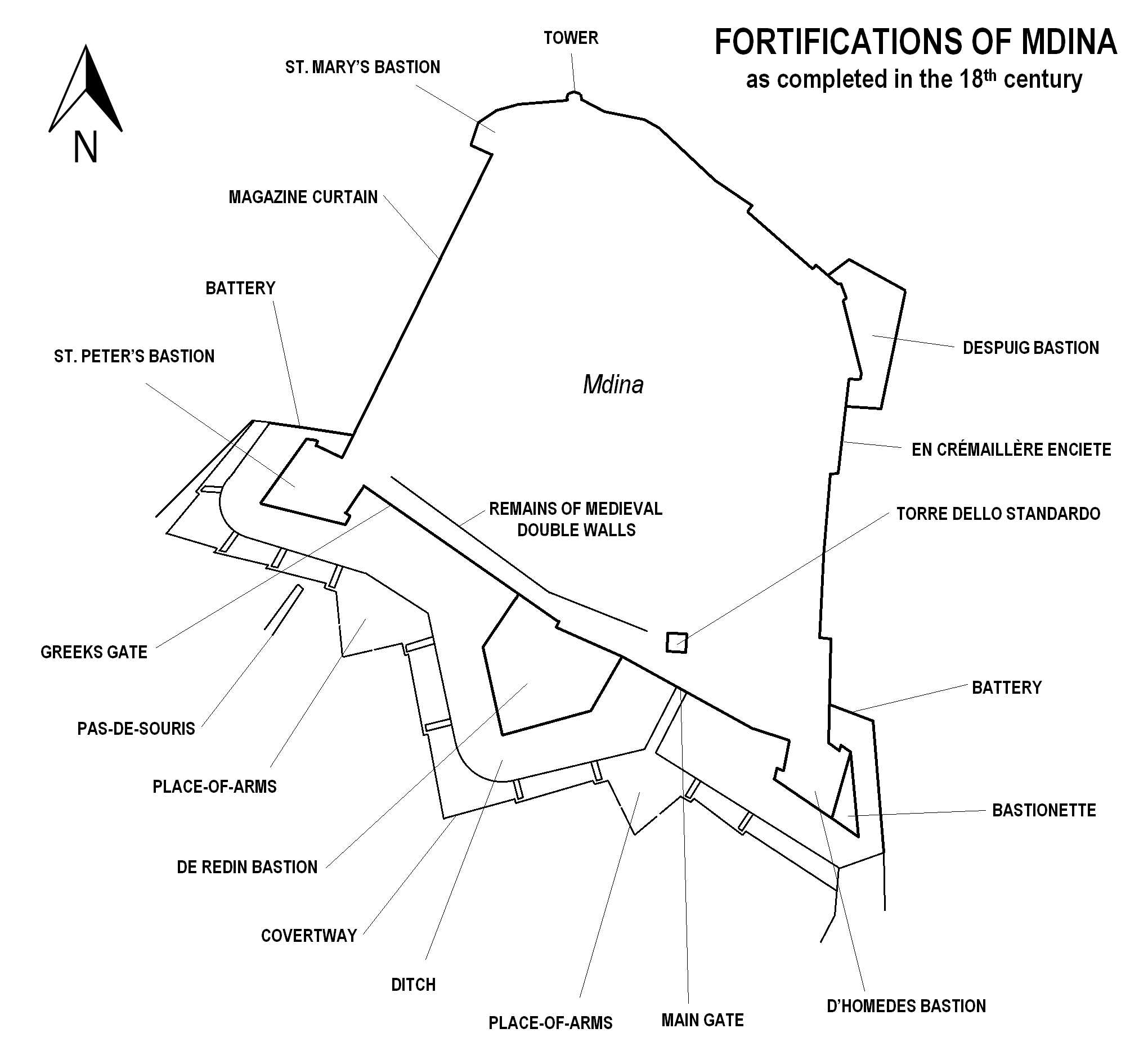
Map of Mdina's fortifications with Mondion's modifications

Mondion also made further plans to strengthen Mdina's fortifications, but they were not implemented, since the Order focused on building its fortifications in the harbour area. The only major addition to the Mdina fortifications after Mondion's reconstruction was Despuig Bastion, which was built during the reign of Ramon Despuig between 1739 and 1746.

On 10 June 1798, Mdina was captured, without much resistance, by French forces during the French invasion of Malta. A French garrison remained in the city, but a Maltese uprising broke out on 2 September of that year. The following day, rebels entered the city through a sally port in Despuig Bastion and massacred the garrison of 65 men. These events marked the beginning of a two-year uprising and blockade, which ended in 1800 with Malta becoming a British protectorate.

Mdina's fortifications remained in use during the British period, and some minor alterations, such as the installation of gun emplacements, were made in the 19th century. By the end of the century, the city was regarded as forming part of the defensive system of the Victoria Lines.

In the 1890s, the battery near St. Peter Bastion was demolished and a gateway was opened within the Magazine Curtain. This was done in order to facilitate access to the newly built railway station located nearby. The fortifications were included on the Antiquities List of 1925.

Some of the countermine galleries in Mdina's ditch were used as air raid shelters during World War II.

== Recent history ==
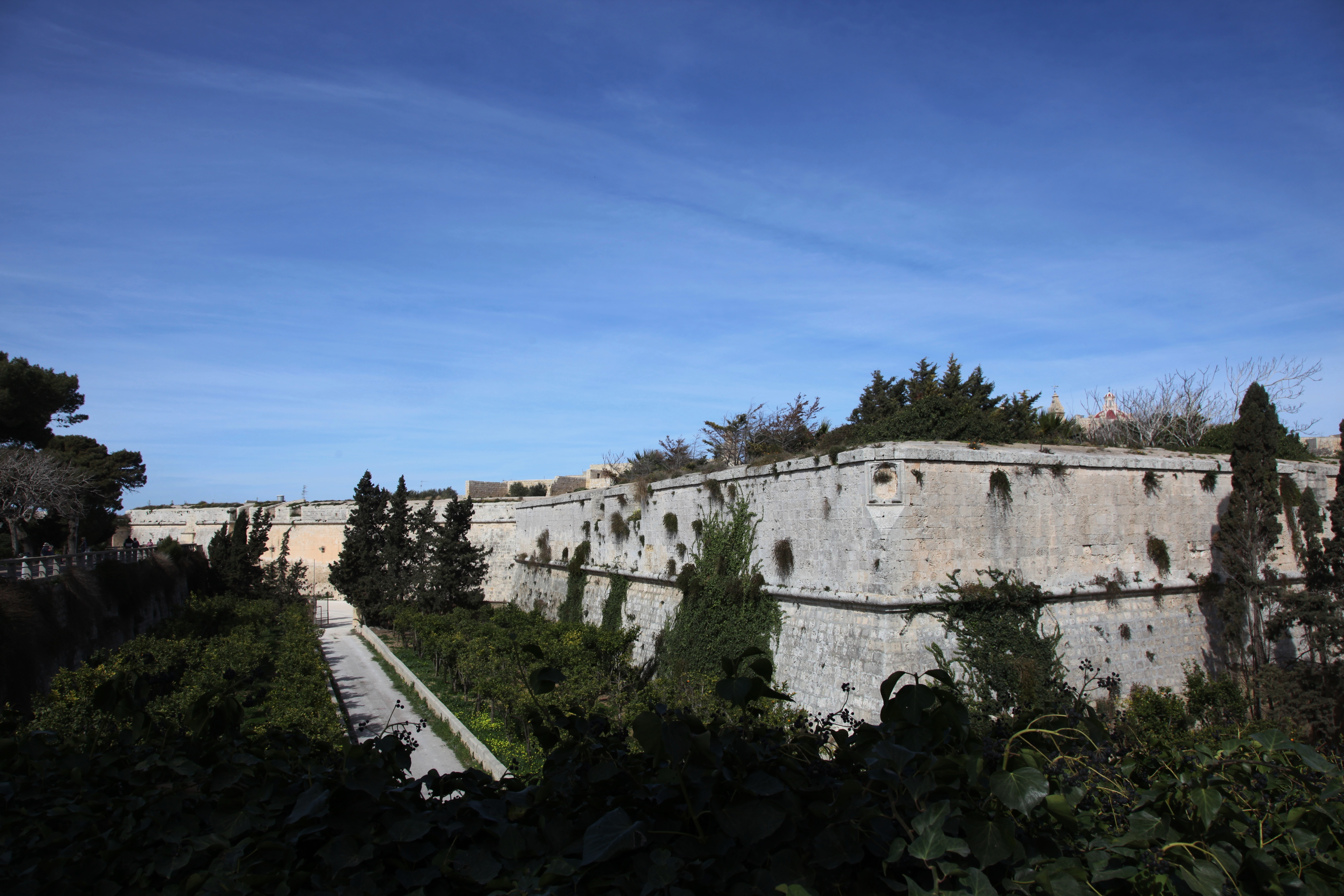
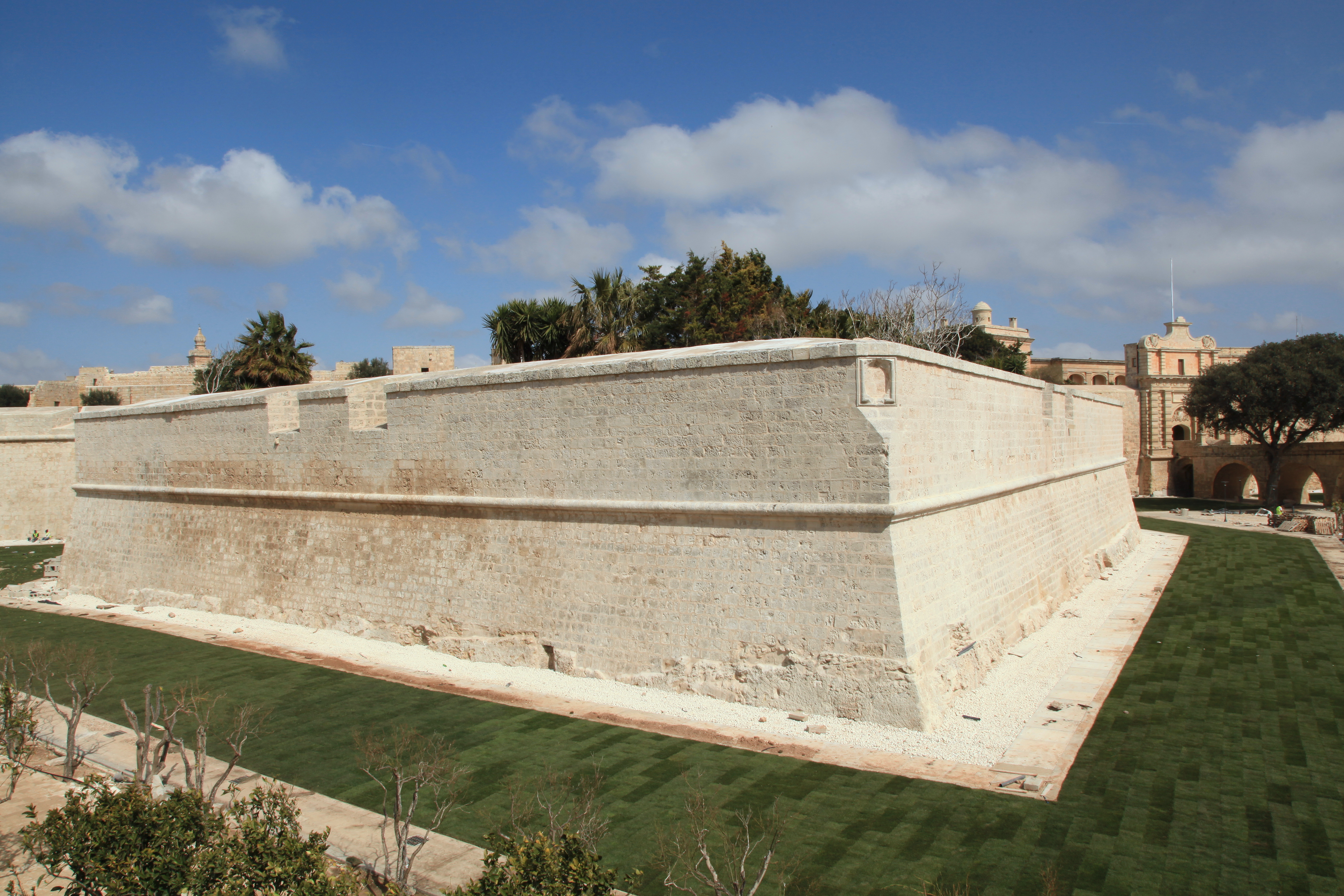
De Redin Bastion before and after restoration (photos taken from different angles)

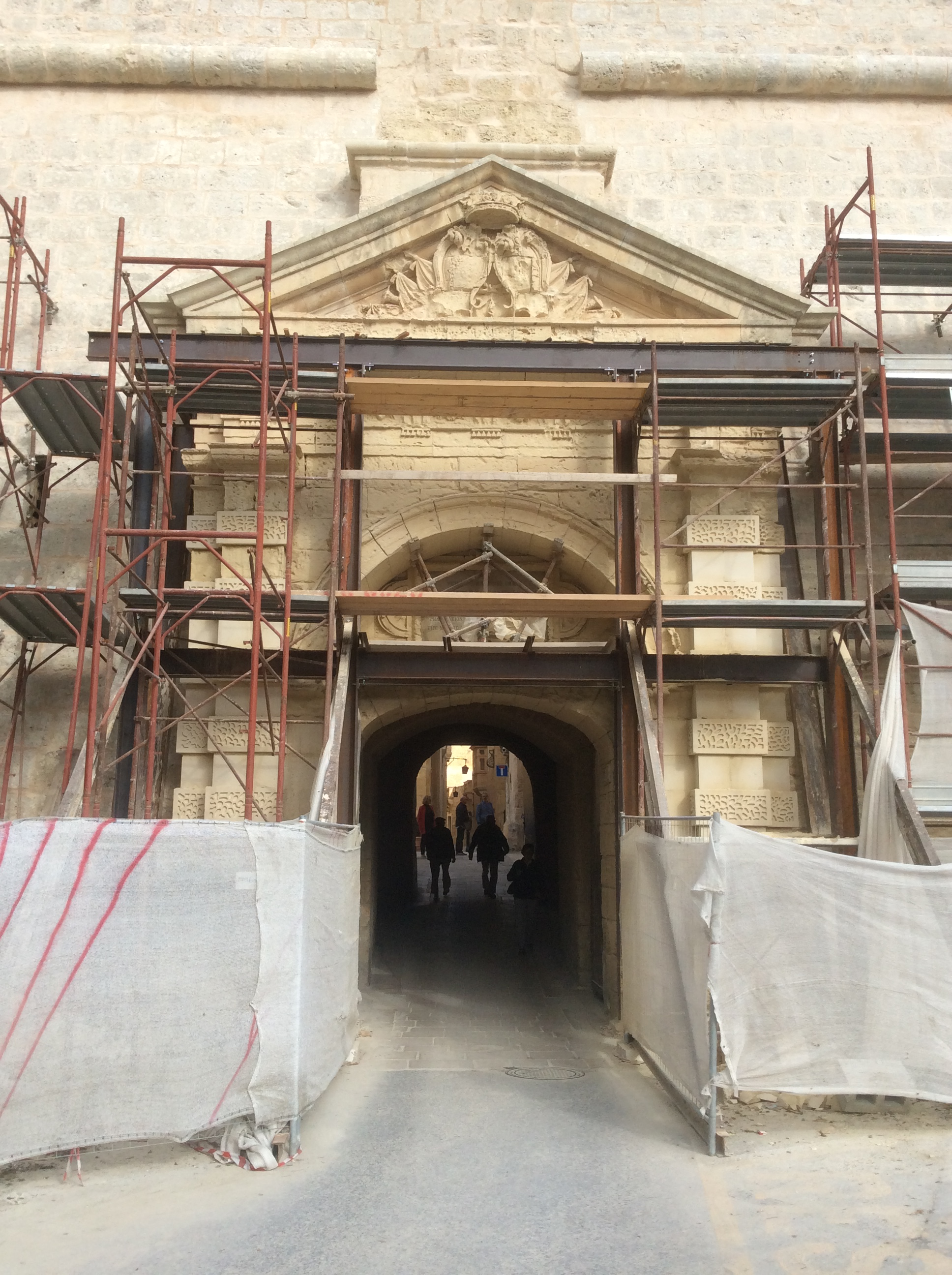
Greeks Gate undergoing restoration in 2015

Sections of the medieval walls of Mdina were rediscovered by Dr. Stephen C. Spiteri and Mario Farrugia while they were surveying the bastions in 2002.

The first plans to undertake a major restoration of Mdina's walls were made in 2006, as part of a project that also included restoration of the fortifications of Valletta, Birgu and the Cittadella. In the case of Mdina, the main goal was to consolidate the terrain, since the city is built on a blue clay plateau which is prone to subsidence. The multimillion-euro restoration was partially financed by the European Regional Development Fund. Works began in early 2008, carried out by the Restoration Unit. The process of restoration was documented by Dr. Spiteri.

In 2011, steel rods were inserted into D'Homedes Bastion in order to prevent the walls from slipping down the clay slopes. The ditch was inaugurated as a public garden in March 2013. All ERDF-financed work was completed in late 2013, but the Restoration Directorate later restored other parts of the fortifications, including the northern walls, St. Peter Bastion and the area around Greeks Gate. The project was fully completed in early 2016.

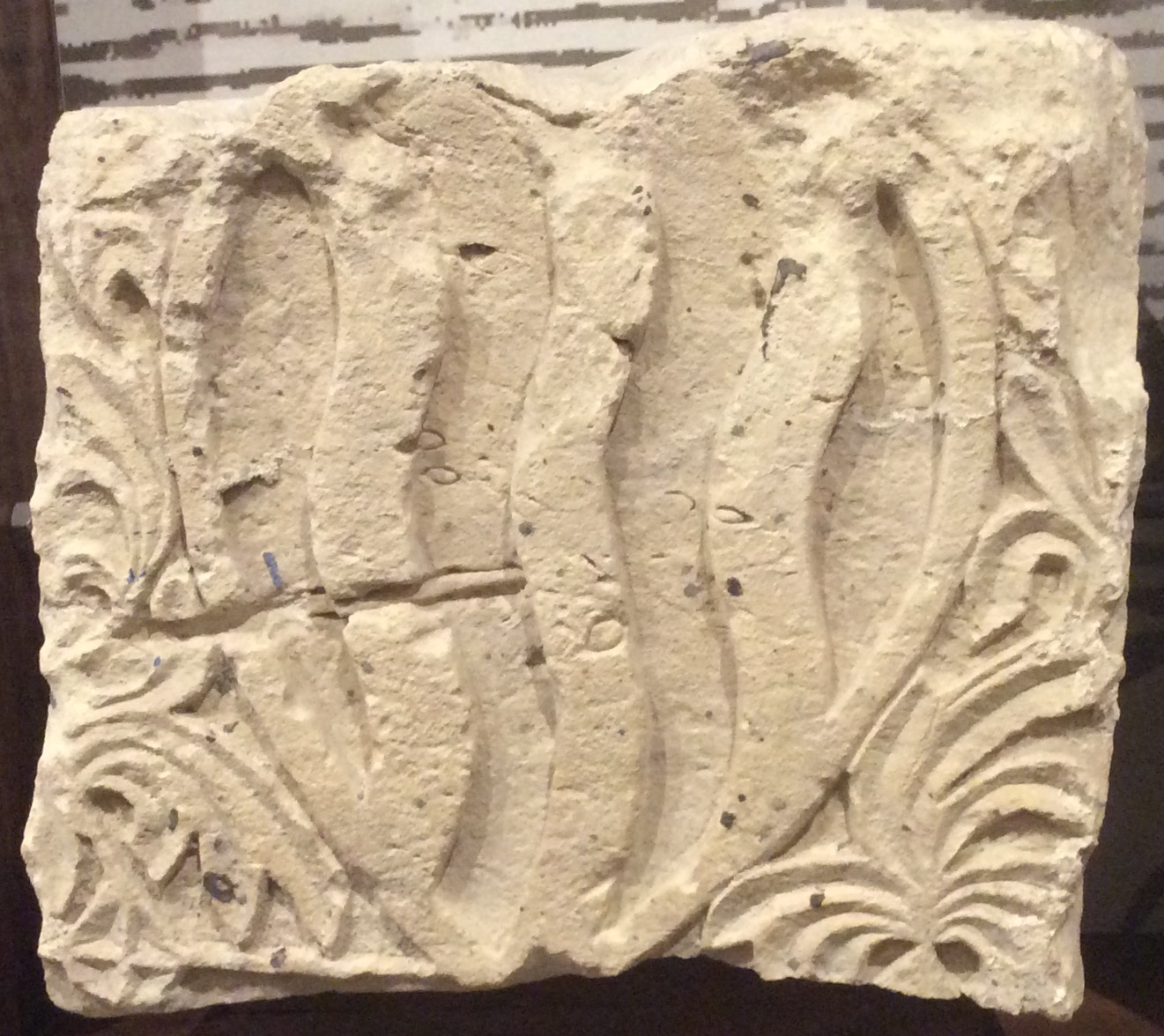
A 14th-century limestone block bearing a coat of arms, which was discovered at D'Homedes Bastion in 2012

Throughout the course of the restoration, a number of archaeological discoveries were made. Excavations along the eastern part of the city walls unearthed Byzantine antemurals and the base of a late 15th-century cubete artillero (artillery platform). In 2010, remains of the foundations of the Punic-Roman walls were found when excavations were made along the Magazine Curtain. A late 14th-century stone block bearing the coat of arms of Guglielmo Murina, possibly originating from the Castellu di la Chitati, was discovered in 2012 during the restoration of D'Homedes Bastion. This block is now displayed at the Fortifications Interpretation Centre in Valletta.

== Layout ==
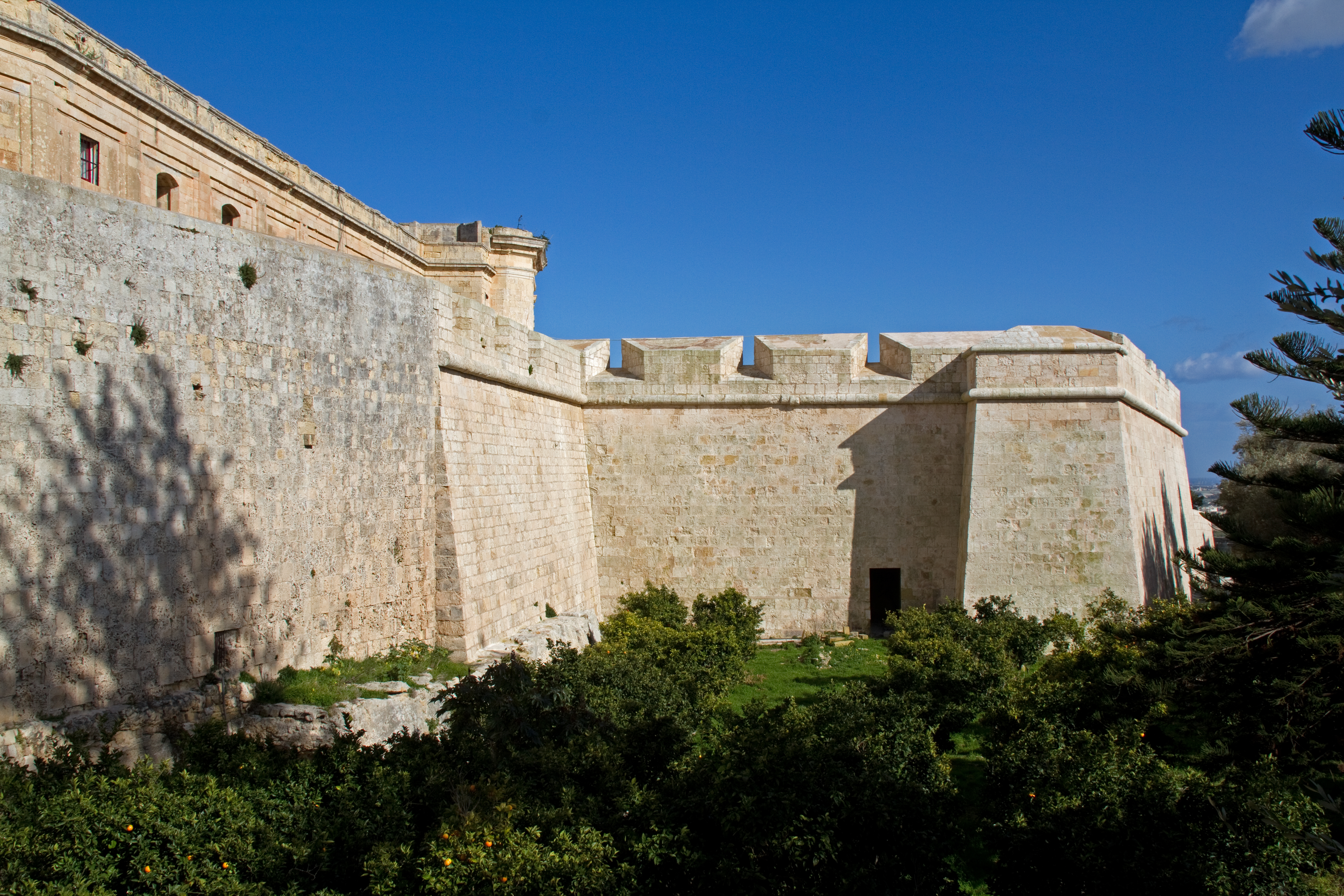
D'Homedes Bastion

The present configuration of Mdina's fortifications consists of an irregular perimeter of curtain walls stiffened by a number of bastions. The northern, western and eastern walls are built on the perimeter of the natural plateau, so they were difficult to attack. The southern perimeter of the city is built on level ground, along what is now the border with Rabat. It was the only realistic direction to assault the city, and was hence known as the Mdina Land Front. The southern perimeter contains an arrowhead-shaped bastion with rectangular orillons on each extremity, with a large pentagonal bastion in the centre:

- St. Peter Bastion, also known as Greeks Gate Bastion – built in the 1550s during the magistracy of Juan de Homedes y Coscon
- De Redin Bastion – built in the 1650s during the magistracy of Martin de Redin
- D'Homedes Bastion, also known as St. Paul Bastion or the belguardo del Palacio – built between the 1540s and 1551 during the magistracy of Juan de Homedes y Coscon. It is further defended by a bastionette.

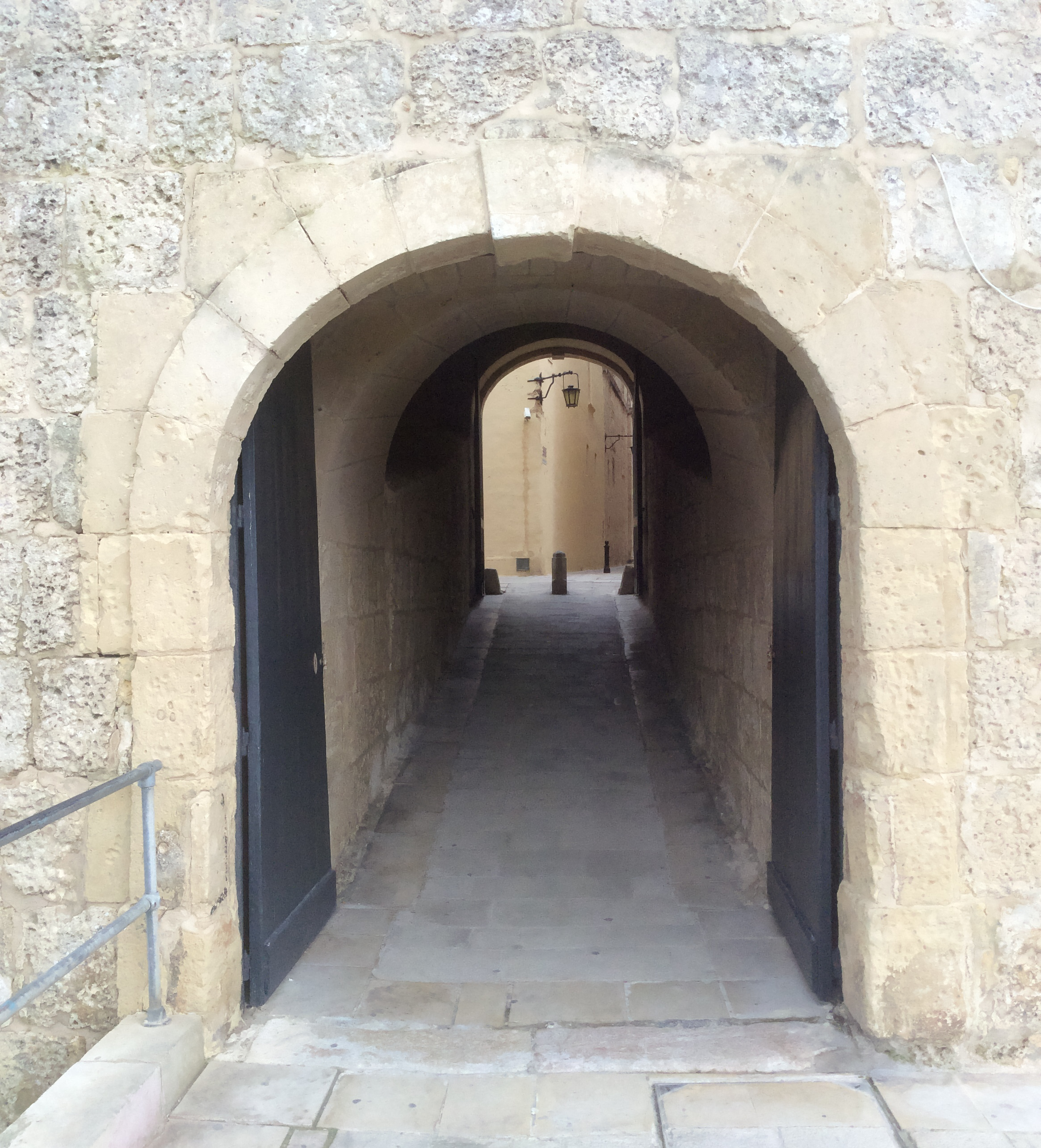
19th-century gate within the Magazine Curtain

The two gates into the city, Mdina Gate and Greeks Gate, are located within the curtain walls of the land front. Remains of the medieval double walls as well as the 18th-century Torre dello Standardo are located just within the city walls. The land front is surrounded by a deep ditch, and a traverse-like battery is located in its eastern extremity.

Most of the eastern walls of the city consist of an en crémaillère enceinte, built in the mid-16th century, although parts of the walls date back to the medieval period. The pentagonal Despuig Bastion, built in the 1740s during the magistracy of Ramon Despuig, is grafted below the walls on the northeastern corner of the city.

The northern walls of Mdina still retain their medieval form with a few Hospitaller modifications, and they contain the only surviving tower in the city walls. St. Mary's Bastion or Ta' Bachar Bastion, which was built in the 16th century, is grafted on the northwest corner of the city. This is linked to St. Peter Bastion by the Magazine Curtain, a long casemated curtain wall built in the 1720s in the western part of the city. A small gate built by the British in the 19th century is located within this curtain wall.
