= Capture of Malta =

Capture of Malta can refer to:

- Capture of Malta (218 BC), by the Romans from the Carthaginians
- Capture of Malta (870), by the Aghlabids from the Byzantines
- Capture of Malta (1091), by the Normans from Muslims
- Capture of Malta (1798), by the French from the Hospitallers
