= Siege of Medina (1053–1054) =

Siege on Malta in the 1050s

Coordinates: 35.886003°N 14.403017°E

- Part of the Arab–Byzantine wars
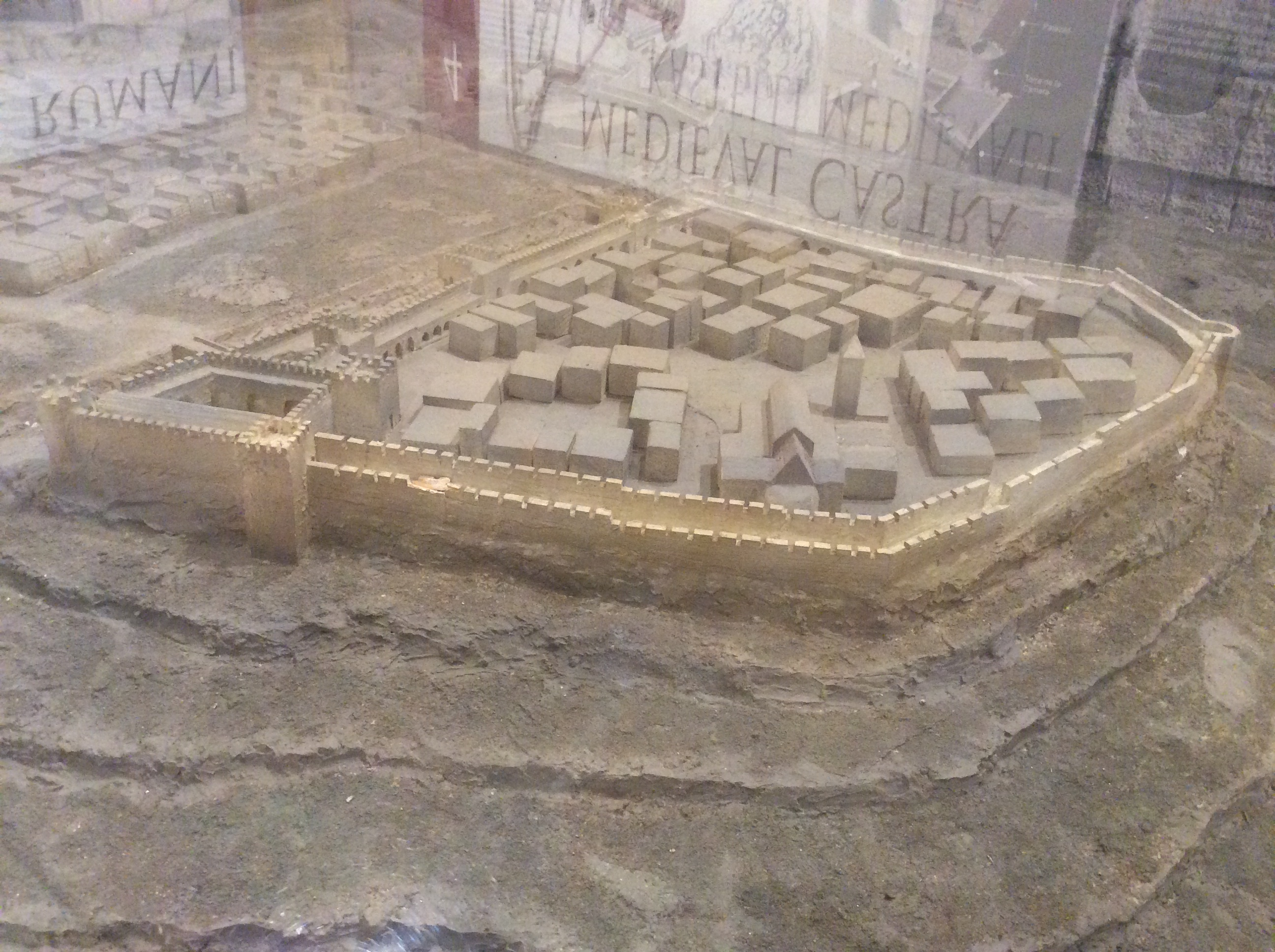
- A possible reconstruction of medieval Medina (model by Richard Azzopardi and Stephen C. Spiteri, displayed at the Fortifications Interpretation Centre)
Date	1053 or 1054
Location	Mdina, Malta
Result	Muslim victory

Belligerents
Byzantine Empire	Muslim inhabitants of Medina and their slaves

Strength
Many ships and many men	c. 400 men c. 500–600 slaves (Note: According to al-Himyarī, "the Muslims reckoned the number of combatants among themselves and they found them to be about 400; then they counted their slaves and found they were more numerous than themselves." The figure of 500 to 600 slaves is a modern estimate.)

Casualties and losses
Heavy (most men killed and almost all ships captured)	Unknown

The siege of Medina was an unsuccessful Byzantine attack on the Muslim city of Medina (modern Mdina), Malta in 1053 or 1054. The Muslim inhabitants of the city and their slaves managed to repel a superior Byzantine force, which retreated with heavy losses. After the siege, the slaves who helped the Muslims against the invaders were freed, and the Byzantines never attempted to retake the island.

== Background ==
The city of Medina was built on the site of the Byzantine city of Melite, which had been captured and destroyed by the Aghlabids in 870. According to the chronicler al-Himyarī, the settlement was established in 1048–1049 by a Muslim community and their slaves. Archaeological evidence suggests that the city was already a thriving Muslim settlement by the beginning of the 11th century, so 1048–1049 might be the date when the city was officially founded and its walls were constructed.

== Siege ==
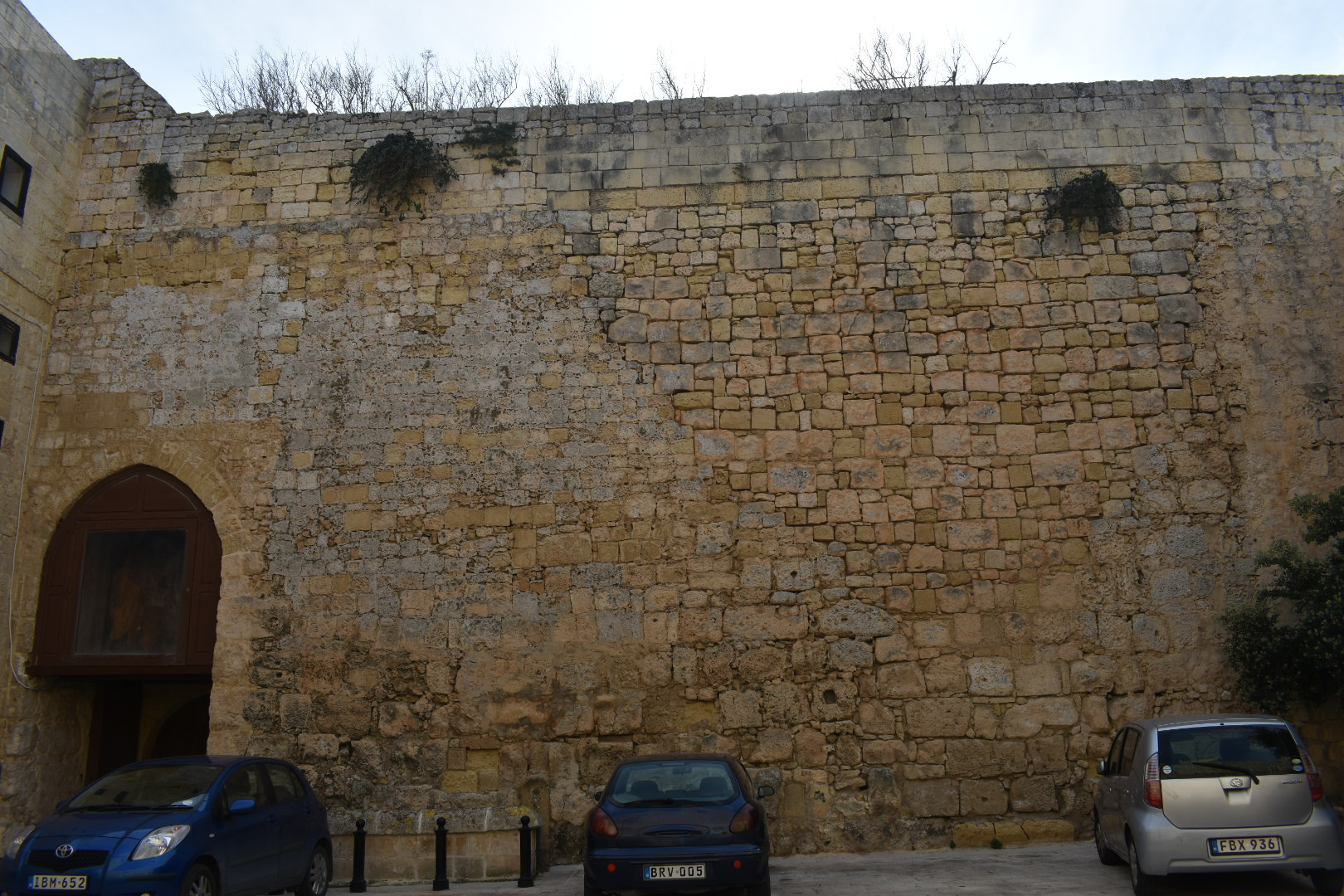
Fortification wall near Greeks Gate (left), probably including parts of the Arab walls of the city

In 445 AH (1053–54 AD), the Byzantine Empire attacked the newly established Muslim settlement on Malta "with many ships and in great numbers." The city of Medina was besieged, and its inhabitants asked for clemency but were refused by the Byzantines. The Muslims had only 400 men, but they were outnumbered by their slaves, so they offered them freedom and their daughters in marriage if they would help them repel the invaders.

The slaves agreed with these terms, and they launched an attack on the Byzantines. The invaders began an assault on the second day, but after some fighting they were repelled "and they fled defeated without looking back." The Byzantines attempted to retreat from the island, but most of them were killed, and only one ship managed to escape. The other ships were taken over by the Muslims, and the slaves were freed as had been promised. The Byzantines never attempted to retake Malta.

== Analysis ==
"The Rûm attacked it [Malta] after 440 (1048/8), they waged war with the (inhabitants) and they demanded from them riches and women [...] And the Muslims assembled and counted themselves, and the number of their slaves exceeded the number of free men [...] So they said to their slaves: "Fight with us; and if you win, you will be free and what we have will also be yours; if you do not agree to this, we shall be killed, and so will you," [...] And when the Rûm came forward [the Muslims and the slaves] charged the enemy as a single man; and God helped them, so that they defeated and slaughtered a great number of the Rûm. The slaves were raised up to the level of the free men; their (joint) power became very strong and after this event the Rûm never again attacked them.

— Al-Qazwini

Most details about the siege of Medina are known from Kitab al-Rawd al-Mitar, which was written by Muhammad bin 'Abd al-Mun'im al-Himyarī in the 15th century. Al-Himyarī's account was discovered in 1931, and the first full edition was published in 1975 in Beirut. The passage relating to Malta remained unknown until being translated to English in 1990. It is one of the most detailed sources about the siege.

The account of the siege does not make it clear as to what was the ethnicity of the slaves who helped the Muslims repel the Byzantines. The source implies that they were not Muslim, and they were most likely not Arabs, although they are believed to have spoken Arabic. They were most likely Sicilian or Slav Christians or Christian converts to Islam, and they were probably assimilated with any Maltese survivors from the massacre of 870.

The city would eventually fall to Roger I of Sicily during the Norman invasion of Malta in 1091.
