= Norman invasion of Malta =

- Part of the Norman conquest of southern Italy
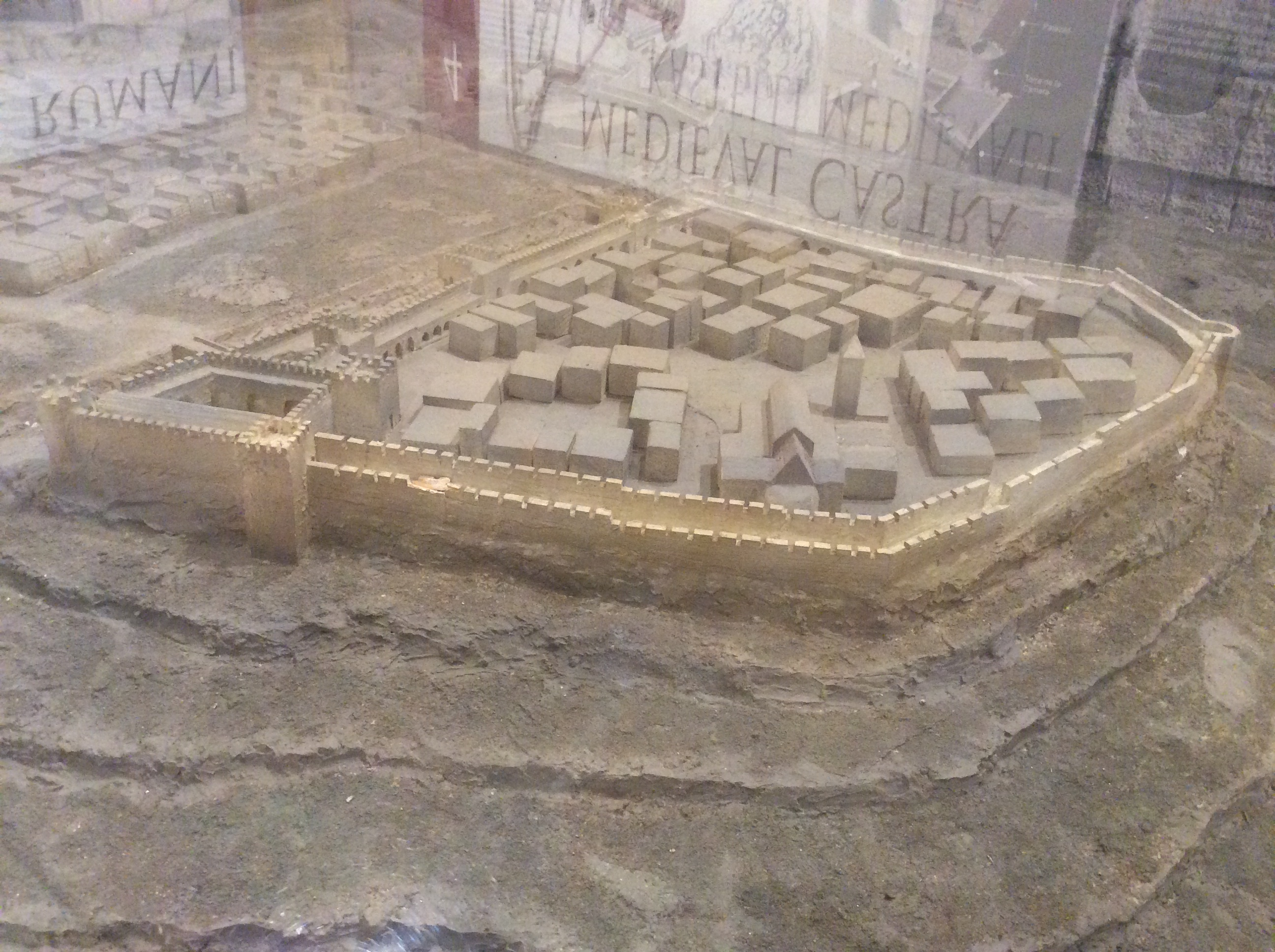
- A possible reconstruction of medieval Medina (model by Richard Azzopardi and Stephen C. Spiteri, displayed at the Fortifications Interpretation Centre in Valletta)
Date	June or July 1091
Location	Malta
Result	Norman victory

Belligerents
County of Sicily	Muslims of Malta

Commanders and leaders
Roger I of Sicily	Unknown

Casualties and losses
Unknown	Some killed

The Norman invasion of Malta was an attack on the island of Malta, then inhabited predominantly by Muslims, by forces of the Norman County of Sicily led by Roger I in 1091. The invaders besieged Medina (modern Mdina), the main settlement on the island, but the inhabitants managed to negotiate peace terms. The Muslims freed Christian captives, swore an oath of loyalty to Roger and paid him an annual tribute. Roger's army then sacked Gozo and returned to Sicily with the freed captives.

The attack did not bring about any major political change, but it paved the way for the re-Christianization of Malta, which began in 1127. Over the centuries, the invasion of 1091 was romanticized as the liberation of Christian Malta from Muslim rule, and a number of traditions and legends arose from it, such as the unlikely claim that Count Roger gave his colours red and white to the Maltese as their national colours.

== Background ==
The Norman conquest of southern Italy began in around the beginning of the 11th century. The conquest of Sicily was complete by 1091, with the fall of the last Muslim stronghold of Noto. Their location off the coast of Sicily made the Maltese Islands a natural target for Norman expansion to conclude the conquest of Sicily. Plans to attack Malta had been made by Robert Guiscard as early as 1072.

At the time, Malta was primarily inhabited by Muslims. According to Al-Himyarī, the island had been depopulated following an Aghlabid attack in 870 AD and it was repopulated by a Muslim community in 1048–49. Archaeological evidence suggests that Medina was a thriving Muslim settlement by the beginning of the 11th century, so 1048–49 might be the date when the city was officially founded and its walls were constructed. It is possible that the Muslims who inhabited Malta were refugees who had fled Sicily due to the Arab–Byzantine wars. The Byzantines made an unsuccessful attempt to recapture Malta in 1053–54.

== Invasion and aftermath ==
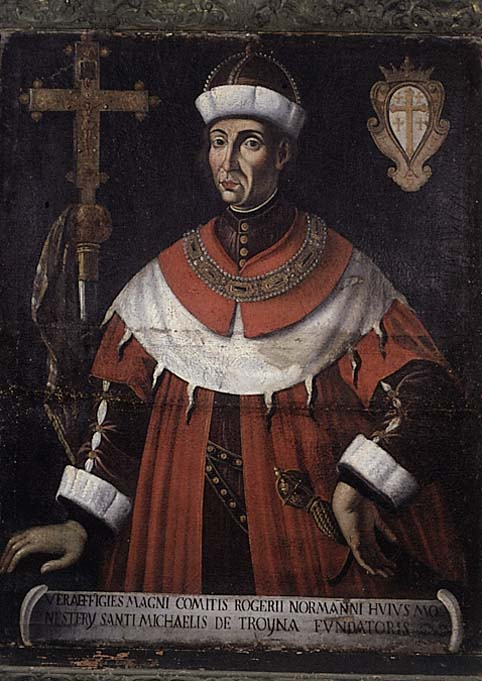
Roger I of Sicily

The Norman fleet led by Count Roger I left Cape Scalambri in Sicily in June or July 1091 and arrived in Malta within two days. Roger's eldest son, Jordan of Hauteville, had wanted to command the expedition against Malta but Roger decided to go in person, possibly because he feared that his son might defect to the Muslims. Roger's ship arrived first since it was faster than the others, and he initially disembarked with thirteen knights. The inhabitants offered some resistance to the invaders, but some were killed and the rest fled. Count Roger went after some of those who fled, and returned to the landing point later that day. By then the entire army had disembarked and was encamped on the shoreline.

At daybreak on the next day, Roger and his army marched to the island's capital, Medina, and besieged it. The ruler of the city and its inhabitants were reportedly terrified at the invading army, and asked to meet the Count to discuss peace terms. They freed all the Christian prisoners, and gave horses, mules, all their weapons and a sum of money to the Normans. They also agreed to swear an oath of loyalty to Roger and pay an annual tribute.

The Christian captives reportedly rejoiced at their freedom, and they held wooden or reed crosses, sang Kyrie eleison and flung themselves at Roger's feet. The Christians embarked on Roger's ships, and eventually they went to Sicily. On the way, the Normans invaded and sacked Malta's sister island, Gozo. Upon arrival on Sicily, Roger offered to build a settlement known as "Villafranca" (free village) for the freed captives, which would be exempt from taxation. Those who chose to return to their homes were offered free passage through the Straits of Messina.

In 1192, Tancred of Sicily appointed Margaritus of Brindisi the first Count of Malta, perhaps for his unexpected success in capturing Empress Constance contender to the throne. In 1194 Henry VI, Holy Roman Emperor husband of Constance conquered Kingdom of Sicily, thus the county of Margaritus was forfeited.

== Analysis ==
The most reliable near-contemporary source regarding the Norman invasion of Malta is an account by the 11th-century historian Goffredo Malaterra. This highly acclaims the actions of Count Roger. In later centuries, the Norman invasion was romanticized into a tale where Roger liberated the Christians of Malta from oppressive Muslim rule, and this concept entered Maltese tradition and folklore. The idea of a surviving Maltese Christian population throughout the period of Muslim rule was promoted by the 17th-century historian Giovanni Francesco Abela. There is no evidence of a surviving indigenous Christian population, although this has been disputed and there is very little evidence from the period of 870–1091 in general. It is believed that the Christian captives freed in 1091 were not indigenous Maltese or Sicilians, but were possibly from Italy or elsewhere in Europe.

Historical coat of arms of the Hauteville family (left) and the modern flag of Malta (right). The tradition that the colours of the latter originate from the Norman invasion seems to have been a 19th-century invention.

By the 19th century, a number of unsourced "details" had been gradually added by different authors into accounts of the Norman invasion. These include speculation that some Maltese assisted the Normans in their attack against the Muslims, and that Roger allowed the Arabs to remain in Malta and continue to practice their religion. Some accounts stated that after the invasion Roger established a popular council and gave laws and privileges to the Maltese. Roger was also credited with granting the colours of the Hauteville family – red and white – to the Maltese as their coat of arms and national colours. This attribution seems to originate from a pamphlet dated 1841. Today, red and white form the basis of the flag and coat of arms of Malta, but the claim that the colours originate from the 1091 invasion is unsubstantiated and unlikely.

Local traditions and legends related a number of places around Malta to the Norman invasion. Miġra l-Ferħa, a small inlet near Mtaħleb on the western coast of Malta, is said to have been the place where Roger and his army landed. Ferħ means "joy" in Maltese, and it was eventually thought that the place name originated from the welcoming of the Count. In reality, the inlet would not have been suitable for a landing, since it can only accommodate two or three ships and is unsafe. Wied ir-Rum (Valley of the Christians), located west of Mdina, also became identified as a place where Maltese Christians lived during the period of Muslim rule, and where the Maltese met before welcoming Count Roger.

Today, the Norman invasion is regarded as little more than a razzia (raid), and not as an attempt to establish a permanent occupation of the islands. The establishment of a Christian regime on Malta only occurred after another invasion by Count Roger's son, King Roger II of Sicily, in 1127. At this point, Christian settlers arrived in Malta, including administrators, garrison members, traders and clergy. Their languages merged with the Siculo-Arabic dialect spoken by the Muslim population, eventually evolving into the Maltese language. This brought about the Christianization of Malta, although Islam survived in the islands until around 1250.

The invasion was formerly thought to have occurred in the year 1090, but it is now believed to have occurred in 1091.
