= Siege of Melite (870) =

Battle during the Muslim conquest of Sicily

Coordinates: 35.886003°N 14.403017°E

- Part of the Muslim conquest of Sicily (Arab–Byzantine wars)
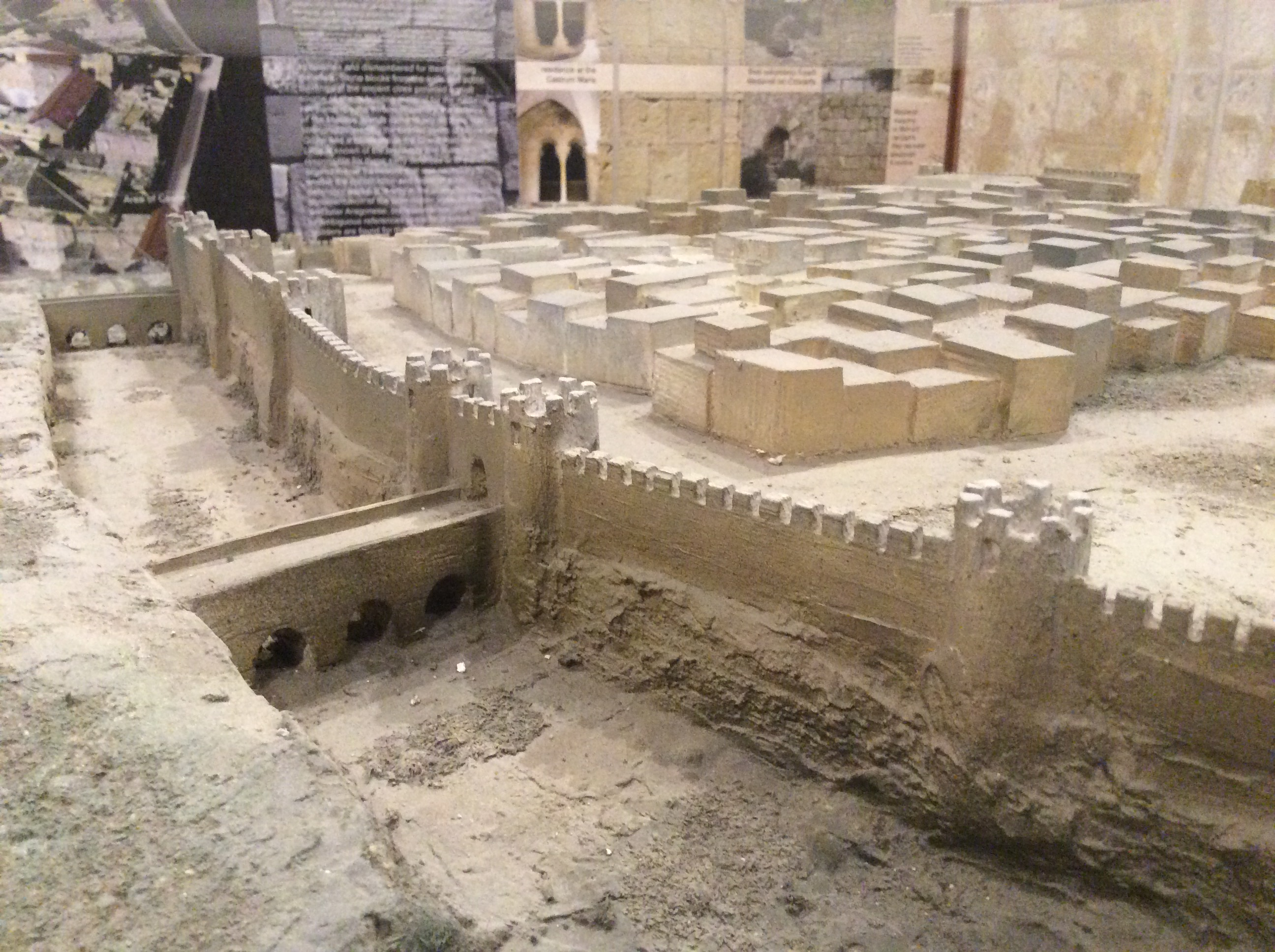
- A possible reconstruction of the Roman walls of Melite (model by Richard Azzopardi and Stephen C. Spiteri, displayed at the Fortifications Interpretation Centre)
Date	c. 870 AD
Location	Melite, Byzantine Empire (modern Mdina, Malta)
Result	Aghlabid victory

Belligerents
Aghlabids	Byzantine Empire

Commanders and leaders
Halaf al-Hādim †; Sawāda Ibn Muḥammad	Amros (Possibly Ambrosios) (POW)

Casualties and losses
Unknown	Heavy

The siege of Melite was the capture of the Byzantine city of Melite (modern Mdina, Malta) by an invading Aghlabid army in 870 AD. The siege was initially led by Halaf al-Hādim, a renowned engineer, but he was killed and replaced by Sawāda Ibn Muḥammad. The city withstood the siege for some weeks or months, but it ultimately fell to the invaders, and its inhabitants were massacred and the city was sacked.

== Background ==
The Maltese islands had been part of the Byzantine Empire since 535 AD, and archaeological evidence suggests that they probably had an important strategic role within the empire. When the early Muslim conquests began in the 7th century, the Byzantines were threatened in the Mediterranean, so probably efforts were made to improve the defences of Malta. At this point, they might have built a retrenchment which reduced Melite to one third of its original size. (Note: According to tradition, the city was reduced to its present size during Arab rule, after the siege.)

A Muslim reconnaissance raid to Malta might have taken place in 221 AH (835–36 AD).

Of all the islands around Sicily, Malta was the last to remain in Byzantine hands, and in 869 a fleet under Ahmad ibn Umar ibn Ubaydallah ibn al-Aghlab al-Habashi attacked it. The Byzantines, having received timely reinforcements, resisted successfully at first, but in 870 Muhammad sent a fleet from Sicily to the island, and the capital Melite fell on 29 August 870. The local governor was captured, the town was plundered—Ahmad al-Habashi reportedly took along the local cathedral's marble columns to decorate his palace—and its fortifications razed. The fall of Malta had important ramifications for the defence of what remained of Byzantine Sicily: with Reggio Calabria and now Malta in their hands, the Muslims completed their encirclement of Sicily, and could easily interdict any aid sent from the east.

Ibn Khaldun reports that the conquest of Malta by the Aghlabids happened as early as 868. Ibn al-Khatib dates the conquest of Malta, and the capture of its "king" between 11 February and 12 March 875, while Al-Nuwayri refers to the same general period, without giving a specific date. Ibn al-Athir recounts that in 869–870, the Emir of Sicily sent an army to Malta, as the island was being besieged by the Byzantines who then fled. This date is also confirmed by a Greek chronicle from Cassano, Calabria, saying that the island of Melite surrendered on 29 August 870. This date is again confirmed in another Arab source, the Kitab al-'Uyun, which says that Malta was conquered by Abdallah I, and gives the date for the conquest to be three days before Ramadan 256 AH, that is, 28 August 870. Historians explain the slight discrepancy due to uncertainties in lunar observations relating to the Islamic calendar.

== Al-Himyarī's account ==
Most details about the siege of Melite are known from Kitab al-Rawd al-Mitar, which was written by Muhammad bin 'Abd al-Mun'im al-Himyarī in the 15th century. This account states that the attack on Melite was initially led by an engineer Halaf al-Hādim, who was killed during the siege. The invaders wrote to the Aghlabid ruler Abu ‘Abd Allāh, who ordered Muḥammad Ibn Hafāğa, the governor of Sicily, to send a new leader. The wali Sawāda Ibn Muḥammad was sent, and he continued the siege and captured Melite. Its ruler Amros (possibly Ambrosios) was taken prisoner, and the invaders "demolished its fortress, and they looted, and desecrated whatever they could not carry." Marble from Melite's churches was used to build the castle of Sousse (in Tunisia) and the bridge leading to it.

Al-Himyarī further states that the island of Malta remained an uninhabited ruin after the siege, at times being visited by shipbuilders, fishermen, and those who collect honey. The island was repopulated by Muslims in 440 AH (1048–49 AD), who built a settlement known as Medina on the ruins of Melite. The Byzantines besieged the new settlement in 445 AH (1053–54 AD) but were repelled.

== Analysis ==
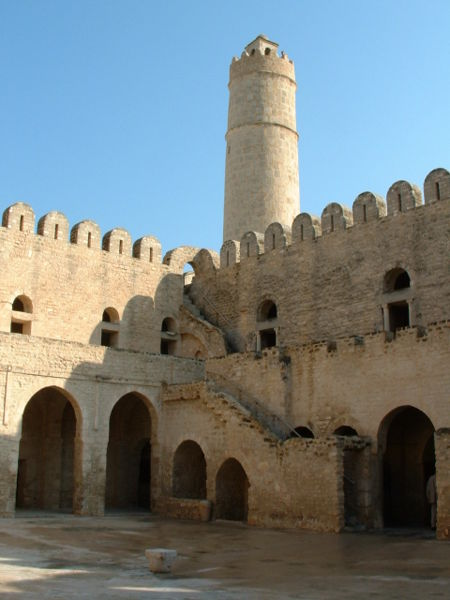
The castle of Sousse, Tunisia, which incorporates marble looted from Melite's churches

Al-Himyarī's account was discovered in 1931, and the first full edition was published in 1975 in Beirut. The passage relating to Malta remained unknown until being translated to English in 1990. It is the most detailed source about the siege, and it contains some information which is not found in any other sources.

The account suggests that the siege lasted for a few weeks or possibly some months. The rulers mentioned in the source confirm that the siege took place sometime between 255 and 257 AH (between 868 and 871 AD).

Some other sources state that in 870 Malta was already a Muslim settlement, and at the time it was besieged by a Byzantine fleet. After an Aghlabid relief force was sent from Sicily, the fleet retreated without a fight on 28 Ramadan 256 (29 August 870). This resulted in ill-treatment of the island's Greek population, and the bishop was arrested and imprisoned in Palermo, while the island's churches were destroyed.

The use of marble from the churches of Melite in the castle of Sousse is confirmed by an inscription on the castle which translates to:

Every cut slab, every marble column in this fort was brought over from the church of Malta by Ḥabaši ibn ‘Umar in the hope of meriting the approval and kindness of Allāh the Powerful and Glorious.

Although al-Himyarī states that Malta remained an "uninhabited ruin" after the siege and it was only repopulated in 1048–49, archaeological evidence suggests that Mdina was already a thriving Muslim settlement by the beginning of the 11th century, so 1048–49 might be the date when the city was officially founded, possibly the date of construction of the city walls.

== Bibliography ==
- Brown, T.S. (1975). Luttrell, Anthony (ed.). Byzantine Malta (PDF). London: The British School at Rome. pp. 71–87. Archived from the original on 2016-02-15.
- Metcalfe, Alex (2009). The Muslims of Medieval Italy. Edinburgh: Edinburgh University Press. ISBN 978-0-7486-2008-1.
- Rossi, E. (1991). "Malta 1. History". In Bosworth, C. E.; van Donzel, E. & Pellat, Ch. (eds.). The Encyclopaedia of Islam, Second Edition. Volume VI: Mahk–Mid. Leiden: E. J. Brill. p. 395. ISBN 978-90-04-08112-3.
- Vasiliev, Alexander A. (1968). Byzance et les Arabes, Tome II: Les relations politiques de Byzance et des Arabes à l'époque de la dynastie macédonienne (les empereurs Basile I, Léon le Sage et Constantin VII Porphyrogénète) 867-959 (253-348). Première partie: Les relations politiques de Byzance et des Arabes à l'époque de la dynastie macédonienne. Première période, de 867 à 959. Corpus Bruxellense Historiae Byzantinae (in French). Vol. 2.1. French ed.: Henri Grégoire, Marius Canard. Brussels: Fondation Byzantine.
