= Kitab al-Rawd al-Mitar =

Book by Muḥammad ibn ʻAbd al-Munʻim al-Ḥimyarī

- Author: Muhammad bin Abd al-Munim al-Himyari
- Original title: كتاب الروض المعطار في خبر الأقطار
- Translator: Évariste Lévi-Provençal (French), María Pilar Maestro González (Spanish)
- Language: Arabic
- Subject: History of Muslim Iberia
- Genre: Geography
- Publication date: 14th century
- Publication place: Hafsid Caliphate
- Media type: Print

Kitāb al-Rawḍ al-miʿṭār fi khabar al-aqṭār (The Book of the Fragrant Garden) is a fourteenth-century Arabic geography by al-Ḥimyarī that is a primary source for the history of Muslim Iberia in the Middle Ages, though it is based in part on the earlier account by Muhammad al-Idrisi. Very little is known about the author, except that he was close to the Hafsid dynasty. It was edited and translated into French by Évariste Lévi-Provençal in 1938 and into Spanish by María Pilar Maestro González in 1963.
