= Stephen C. Spiteri =

Maltese military historian (born 1963)

- Born: September 15, 1963 (age 63)

Academic background
- Education: University of Malta

Academic work
- Discipline: Military historian, author, lecturer and preservationist
- Institutions: University of Malta as the Research Co-ordinator of the Restoration Directorate
- Website: militaryarhitecture.com (Archived)

Stephen C. Spiteri (born 15 September 1963) is a Maltese military historian, author, lecturer and preservationist. His work mainly deals with the military history of Malta, particularly military architecture, and he is regarded as the "leading expert on Malta's fortifications."

== Biography ==
He is the son of architect Joseph M. Spiteri. Spiteri studied at St. Aloysius' College and the University of Malta. He is the Research Co-ordinator of the Restoration Directorate, the Maltese government's entity responsible for restoring historic buildings, and he is also a lecturer at the International Institute for Baroque Studies of the University of Malta. Spiteri previously served as the Superintendent of Fortifications for a decade, and he was also Acting Curator of the Palace Armoury in the Grandmaster's Palace in Valletta. He later became curator of the Fortifications Interpretation Centre, also in Valletta.

Spiteri has written and illustrated numerous authoritative books dealing with the fortifications of Malta, especially those fortresses built by the Knights Hospitaller. All of them are now collector's items fetching often steep prices. He also edits Arx – Online Journal of Military Architecture and Fortification, which is published via his website MilitaryArchitecture.com. Spiteri is one of the founding members of the Sacra Militia Foundation for the study of Hospitaller Military and Naval History, as well as the Fortress Explorer Society.

== Publications ==
- Discovering the Fortifications of the Order of St. John in Malta (1988) Said International, 184 pp.
- The Knights' Fortifications: An Illustrated Guide of the Fortifications Built by the Knights of St. John in Malta (1989, 1990) Published by the author, 240 pp.
- The British Fortifications: An Illustrated Guide to the British Fortifications in Malta (1991) Published by the author, 247 pp.
- Fortresses of the Cross: Hospitaller Military Architecture (1136–1798) (1994) Heritage Interpretation Services, 674 pp.
- British Military Architecture in Malta (1996) Published by the author, 561 pp. ISBN 978-999096818-7.
- The Fougasse, The Stone Mortar of Malta (1999)
- Fortresses of the Knights (2001) BDL Publications, 382 pp. ISBN 978-999097206-1.
- Armoury of the Knights (2003)
- The Great Siege (2005)
- The Art of Fortress Building in Hospitaller Malta (2008) BDL Publications, 597 pp.
- A Visual Guide to the Fortifications of Malta (2017) BDL Publications, 224 pp. ISBN 978-99957-67-38-9.
- "Fort Manoel". Journal of Military Architecture and Fortification (4). ARX. 2014.
