= Għar Ħasan =

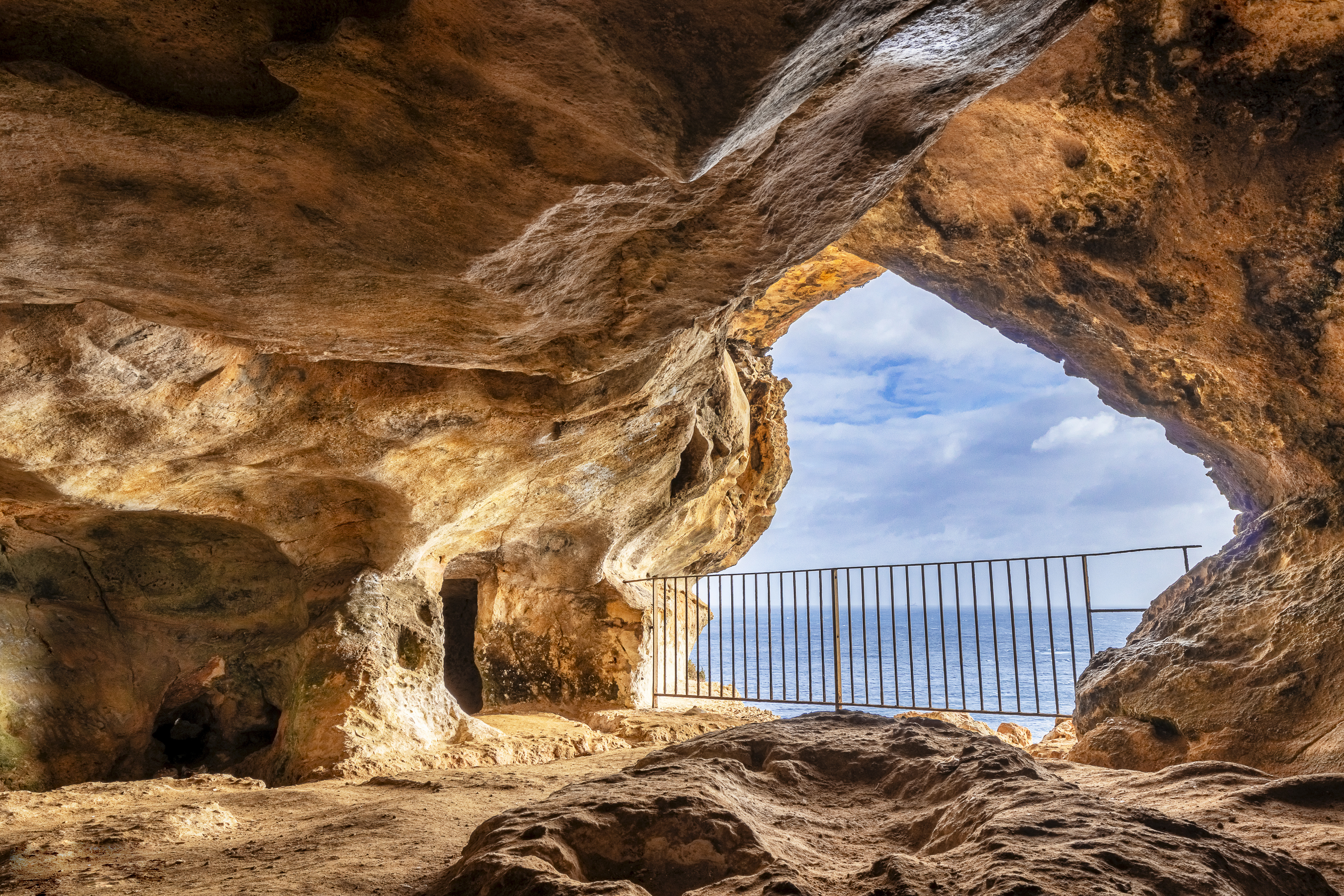
- Għar Ħasan as photographed in 2021
- Interactive map of Għar Ħasan
- Location: Birżebbuġa, Malta
- Coordinates: 35°48′23.8″N 14°31′3.3″E
- Length: 1,270 ft (390 m)
- Elevation: 38 m (125 ft)
- Geology: Karst, Lower Coralline Limestone
- Entrances: 1

Għar Ħasan (English: Hasan's Cave) is a karst limestone cave located along the southern coast of Malta, in the vicinity of Ħal Far within the limits of Birżebbuġa. One of the longest caverns on the island, it consists of several interconnected passageways which lead to two window-like openings in the cliff face along with a rock-hewn chamber which was excavated at an unknown date. The earliest evidence of human activity within the cave dates back to the Bronze Age, and while traces of pigments along some cave walls have sometimes been interpreted as poorly-preserved cave paintings these have never been definitively dated and it is doubtful whether they are of prehistoric origin.

In Maltese folklore, the cave is traditionally associated with a tale of a Muslim man named Ħasan who is said to have used it as a hideout in the 12th century. There are multiple versions of the story, most of which involve Ħasan kidnapping a Maltese woman and culminating in both of their deaths. The cave possibly takes its name from this story, although alternative etymologies have also been proposed. The first known mention of the cave in historical records is from the 16th century, and several investigations and archaeological excavations were carried out between the 1860s and 2010s. The cave was accessible to the public during the 20th and early 21st centuries, but it has since been closed off for safety reasons.

== Description ==
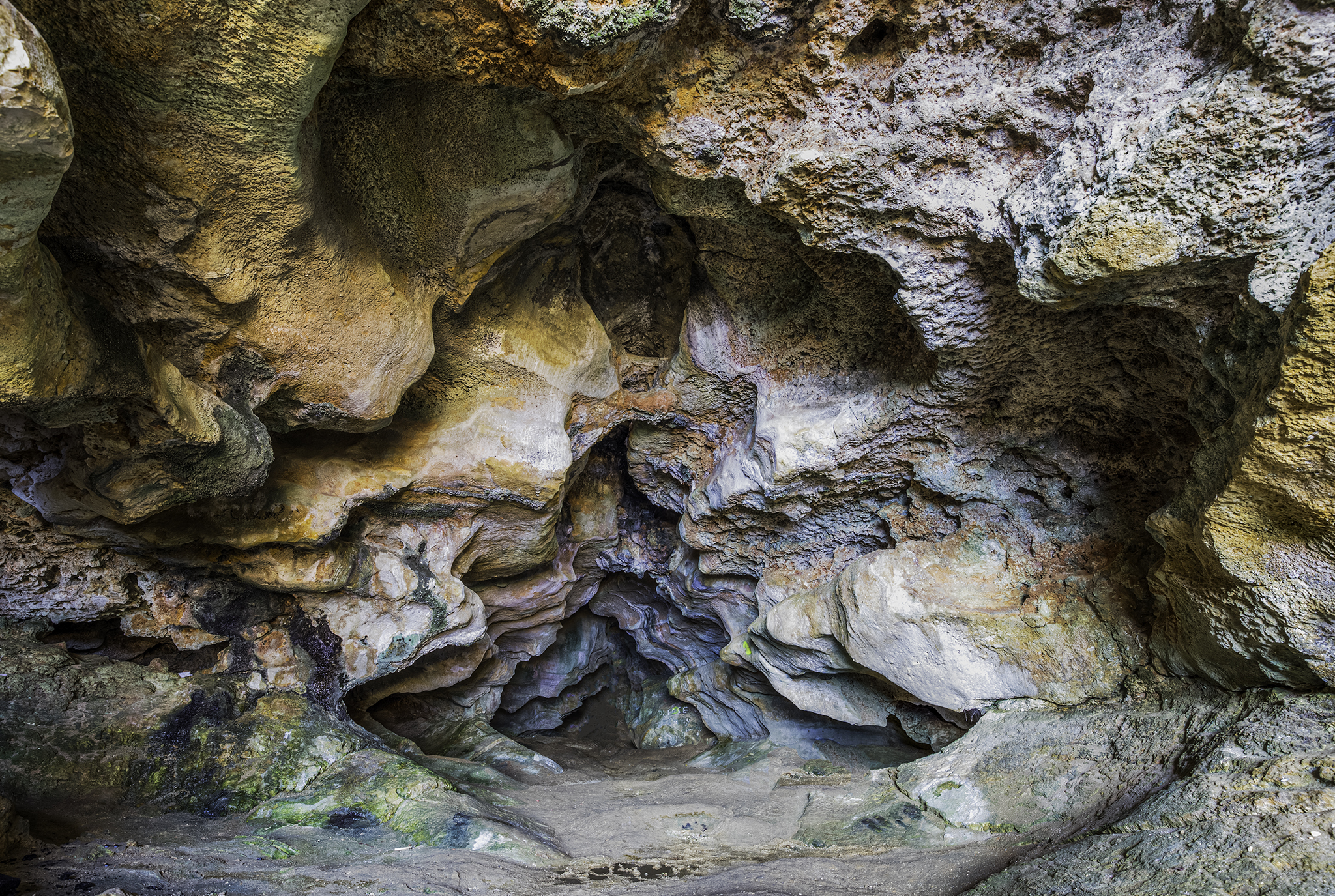
The cave's interior as photographed in 2019

Għar Ħasan is located in the Ħal Far area about 2 km (1.2 mi) southwest of the town of Birżebbuġa. The cave system is located along a stretch of cliffed coastline, and it consists of two main gallery systems running almost perpendicular to one another with a total length of around 1,270 ft (390 m); making it one of the longest caverns in Malta. The entrance, which is accessed from a man-made passageway along the cliff face, is located around 38 m (125 ft) above sea level and 9 m (30 ft) below the top of the cliff. The entrance has a roughly triangular shape with a height of 18 ft (5.5 m) and a width of 21 ft (6.4 m), and it leads to the cave's main passageway which has similar dimensions for about 70 ft (21 m) before narrowing down for around another 20 ft (6.1 m); this narrower section includes several smaller branches with dead ends.

At the point where the main chamber narrows down, it is interconnected to roughly perpendicular passageways which consist of a 210 ft-long (64 m) tunnel to the west and a 240 ft-long (73 m) tunnel to the east. The western tunnel includes two dead end chambers and its width gradually decreases until it eventually splits off into two inaccessible narrow tunnels. The eastern passageway runs parallel to the coastline, and it includes two window-like openings in the cliff face. A man-made oval chamber with a rock-hewn bench is located near one of these openings. A low ceiling tunnel runs parallel to the main eastern passageway for almost its entire length, and it is interconnected with it at multiple points. Most of the passages are large enough for a person to walk through, and there is little evidence of any recent collapses within the cave.

== Geology and formation ==
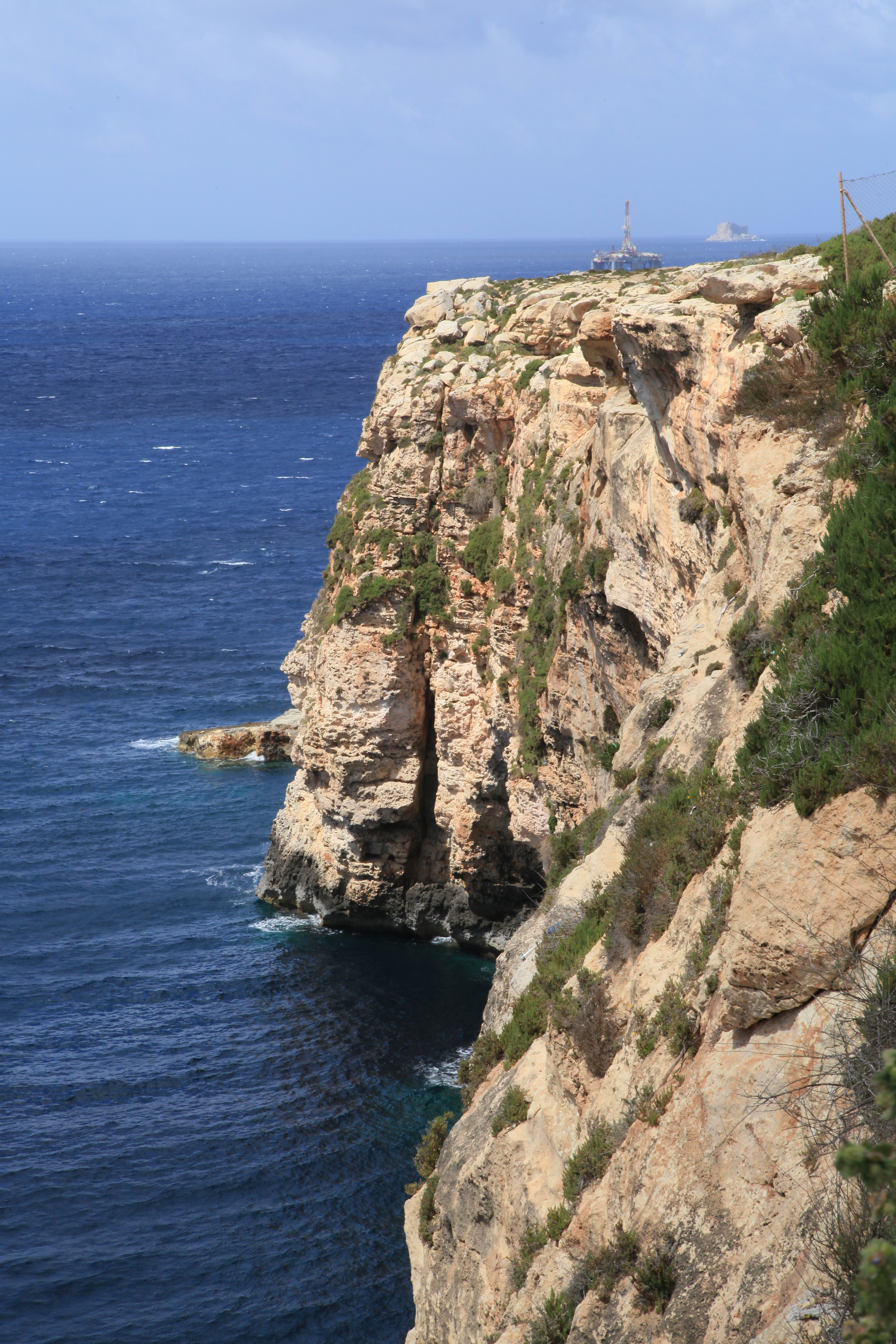
Cliffs in the vicinity of Għar Ħasan as photographed in 2014

The cliff which includes the cave forms part of the Lower Coralline Limestone formation, which is overlaid by Lower Globigerina Limestone deposits. The cave floor and footwalls consist of the Attard Member while the passages and ceilings form part of the Il-Mara Member of Lower Coralline Limestone. Fossils of Pecten bivalves and Clypeaster, Cidaris and Hemiaster sea urchins have been found within the rocks which form the cave.

The cave is believed to have been formed in the late Pliocene or early Pleistocene through karst processes, the erosion of rock due to the action of groundwater. Some of the passageways follow joint fissures, and several large rocks which detached from the cave walls as water filtered down from the surface can be found along the passageways. Most of the cave's passageways are wider at the base, suggesting that the rocks at lower levels were dissolved further as a larger amount of water had gathered at these points. The cave also features some small stalactites and stalagmites.

Most of the cave floor is covered in a few feet of brownish red soil (terra rossa) with some clay content.

== History, archeology and etymology ==
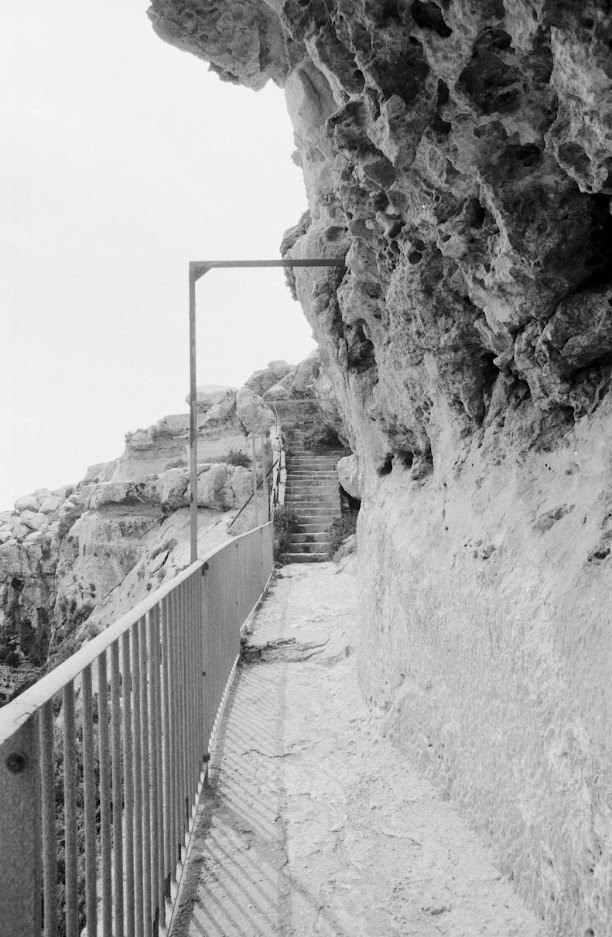
Passageway along the cliff face leading to Għar Ħasan, as photographed in 2020

Pottery sherds excavated in Għar Ħasan in 2019 have been preliminary dated to around the mid-second millennium BC, corresponding to the Middle Bronze Age. The age of the rock-hewn chamber at the east end of the cave system is unknown, but visible tool marks suggest that it does not predate the first millennium BC. It is sometimes identified to have been a tomb, and pottery sherds found there have been attributed to the Roman era. According to tradition this chamber was the hideout of a Saracen called Hasan in the 12th century.

The earliest known mention of the cave is in a notarial record from 1517. The cave's name – which is recorded as gar ilhasan (1517), gar ilchasan (1518), gar hasan (1525) and gar il chasan (1530) in early sources – is traditionally believed to be derived from the Arabic given name Hasan in reference to the folk tale, but it is also possible that it is actually derived from the Arabic words hasan (meaning "inaccessible place") or hisan (meaning "horses"). The latter might be a reference to actual horses or to hippopotami which are known as hisan el bahar ("river horses") in Arabic; although no evidence of hippopotami has ever been found within Għar Ħasan, dwarf hippopotamus fossils have been found elsewhere in Malta including in nearby Għar Dalam.

The cave was mentioned as a local attraction in 19th century descriptions of Malta, and in the 1860s a 10 ft-deep (3.0 m) trench was dug in the cave floor by Andrew Leith Adams. No fossil remains were reported to have been discovered at this point. Access to the cave was made safer to visitors with the construction of a passageway along the cliff face in around the early 20th century. During World War II, Għar Ħasan was used as a makeshift air raid shelter by local inhabitants. In the 1950s, the cave was surveyed by T. R. Shaw and two trenches were excavated.

Further investigations took place in the late 1980s under the direction of Emmanuel Anati and the Missione Archaeologica Italiana. Anati reported traces of pigments which were interpreted to be cave paintings including depictions of animals, an anthopozoomorphic image, hand prints and ideograms. Some considered these paintings to be of prehistoric origin and attributed them to an otherwise-unknown hunter culture which may have inhabited the Maltese Islands prior to the Neolithic, possibly during the Paleolithic, although the paintings were never definitively dated and these reports were controversial. The paintings were in a poor state of preservation, and some of them were later damaged or overpainted by graffiti after Anati's investigations.

The narrow inner part of the cave's main passage was closed off with a metal gate in January 1996. On 14 November 2004, some 180,000 m^{3} (6,400,000 cu ft) of rock collapsed from the cliff face near the cave, followed by another collapse a few days later. The entire cave was subsequently closed for safety reasons after these collapses. Despite being officially closed, the site remained publicly accessible until a gate was installed along the pathway leading down to the cave in 2022.

Investigations of the cave paintings reported by Anati were carried out in December 2017 during the Malta Quaternary Palaeoecologies Project. Further investigations were carried out in September 2019, including non-invasive assessments of the pigments' chemical properties and colour spectrum, along with limited excavations of the cave floor. Most pigment traces analysed at this point were found to be of modern origin; one panel which possibly depicts an animal shape was found to have pigments of different characteristics, but it was not possible to determine its age due to its poor state of preservation. The study concluded that it was unlikely that it has deep prehistoric origins.

== Folklore ==
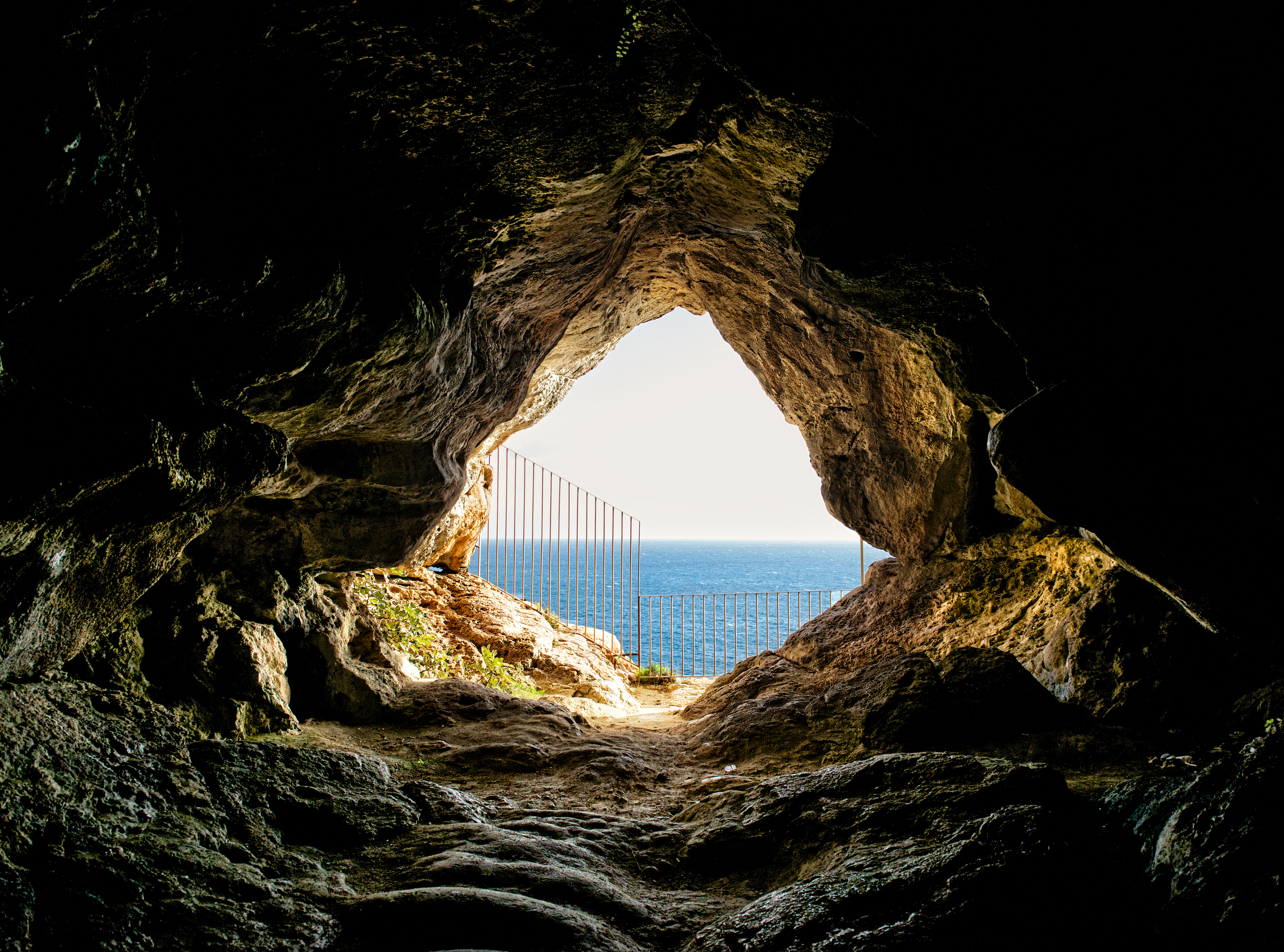
The cave as photographed in 2014, looking towards one of the window-like openings in the cliff face

In Maltese folklore, the cave is associated with a tragic tale involving a Muslim man named Ħasan and a Maltese Christian woman. Most versions of the story state that it took place in around 1122, a few decades after the Norman invasion of Malta, and that the man had taken refuge in the cave which later came to be known as Għar Ħasan after most of the Arabs on Malta had left the islands or had been expelled. Some versions of the story state that Ħasan, a ship captain and the last Arab man left on Malta, had stayed on the island was because he had his eyes on a Maltese woman named Katrina. One day, Ħasan kidnapped her while she was on her way home from her father's fields, and he held her captive within the cave. In some versions, the girl managed to escape but was recaptured by Ħasan, who threatened to kill her.

In other versions of the story, Ħasan is identified as a Muslim man who was enslaved in Malta after being captured during a naval engagement between the Maltese and the Barbary corsairs. He became infatuated with his master's daughter – whose name is sometimes given as Marija – and later attempted to escape the island with her. Some versions claim that she was abducted while others state that she went with him willingly to the cave, from where he intended to escape by sea.

Ħasan wanted the woman to convert to Islam and accompany him to Africa or Asia and he promised to provide for her and make her happy, but she refused to convert and pleaded to remain on Malta; this enraged him and he is said to have bound her hands with rope. Shortly afterwards, Maltese soldiers – led by the woman's father in some versions of the story – entered the cave and demanded her release, but instead Ħasan threw her out of one of the openings in the cliff face and jumped after her to avoid capture. Both of them are said to have died either by hitting the rocks below or by drowning in the sea, and their bodies were never recovered.

In some versions of the story, Ħasan was surprised by the soldiers just as he was lowering the woman down towards a boat which was waiting to take them to Tunisia, and she fell to her death when he let go of the rope in a panic. In yet another version, the woman killed Ħasan using his own dagger during the skirmish with the soldiers, but he caught her dress as he plunged from the cliff and she fell with him to her death; in other versions she killed him in his sleep and managed to safely return to her village.

According to one ballad, Ħasan was a pirate who kidnapped multiple women and held them captive in the cave before sending them to a sultan's harem along the Barbary Coast.

== Flora and fauna ==
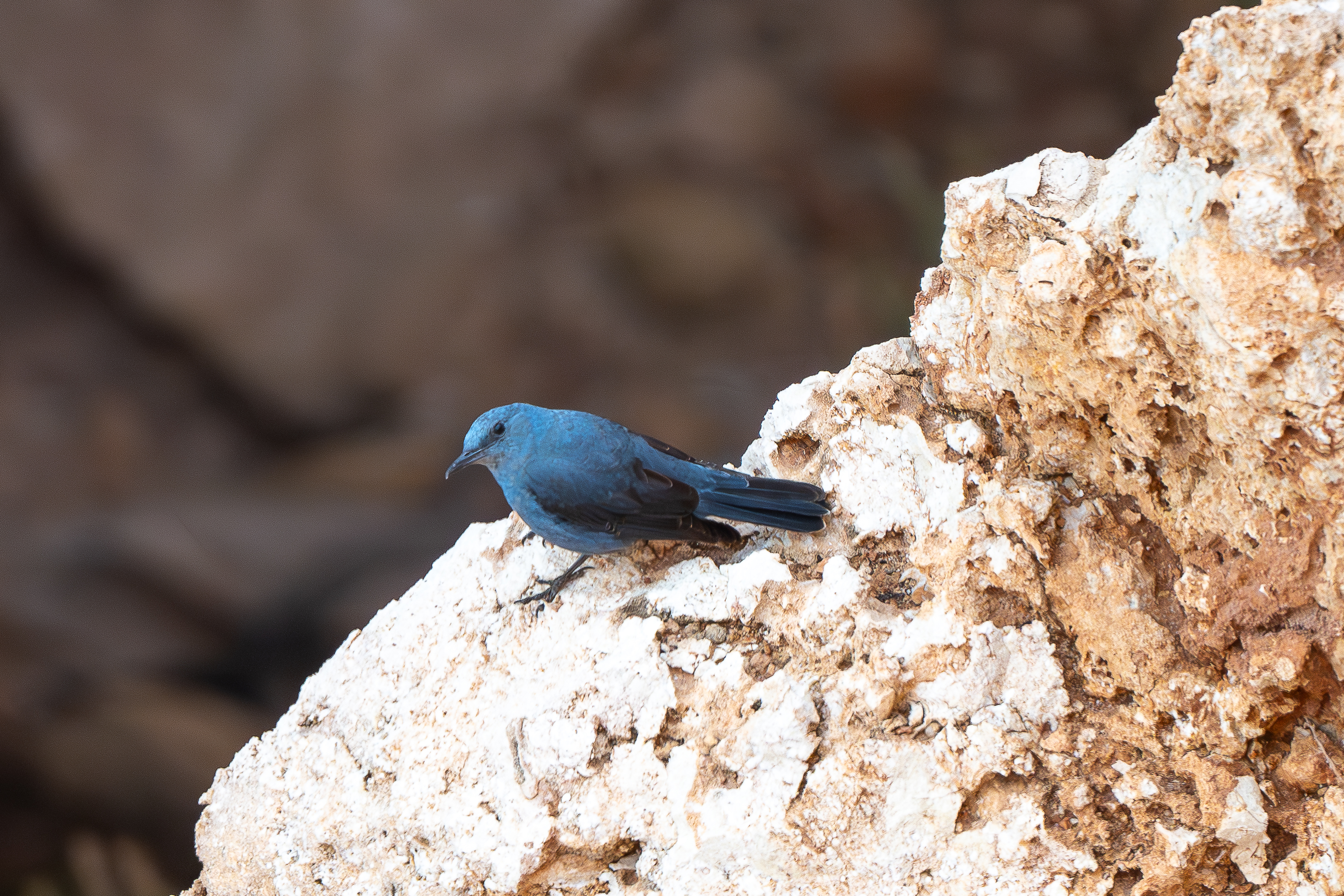
A blue rock thrush photographed at Għar Ħasan in 2025

The cave's flora include maidenhair ferns and Eucladium verticillatum mosses near its entrance and algae growth near the window-like openings. A colony of lesser mouse-eared bats can be found in the cave; other species of bats including the common pipistrelle and the grey long-eared bat also occasionally roost there. Skeletal remains of rats, rabbits and several species of birds including Yelkouan shearwaters have been found within Għar Ħasan. Two species of woodlouse, Armadillidium aelleni and Porcellio laevis, are also known to live within the cave; the former is endemic to the Maltese Islands, and it has only been recorded in Għar Ħasan and a few other caves in the Girgenti area and on Gozo. Short-palped craneflies and daddy long-legs spiders and shells of Pleurodiscus balmei and Marmorana melitensis land snails have also been recorded within the cave.

== Bibliography ==
- Savona-Ventura, Charles; Mifsud, A. (2000). Hasan's Cave: Geology, Folklore and Antiquities. Valletta: Heritage Books. ISBN 978-99909-93-0-73.
