= Slavery in Malta =

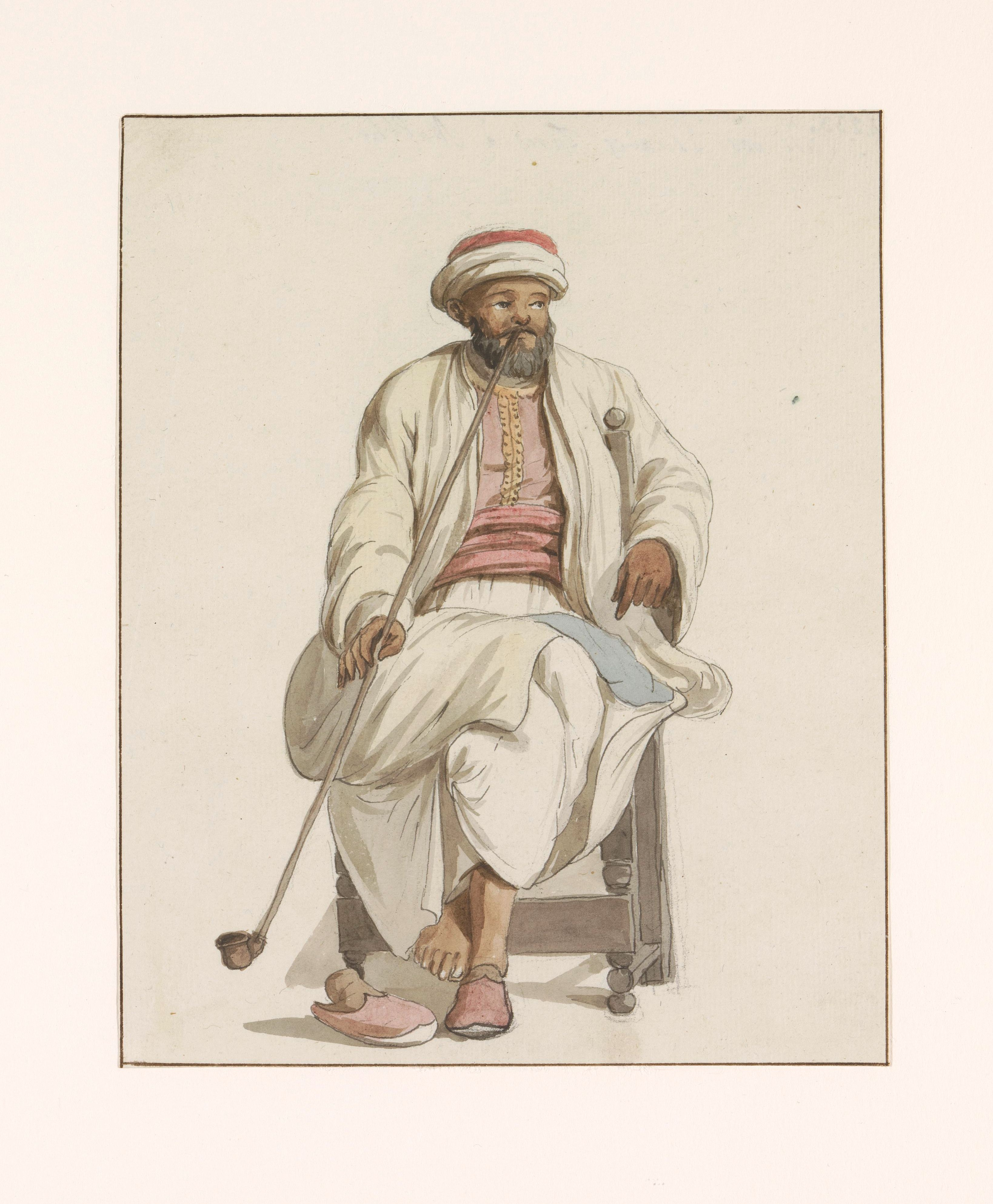
Painting of a Turkish slave kadi in Malta by Abraham-Louis-Rodolphe Ducros, 1778

Slavery (Maltese: skjavitur; jasar) was practiced in Malta from classical antiquity to the early modern period, as was the case in many countries around the Mediterranean Sea. Sources dating back to when the islands were under Arab Muslim rule during the Middle Ages attest to the presence of slavery but lack details regarding the slaves' ethnic and religious backgrounds. When the islands were part of the Kingdom of Sicily during the late medieval period, it is apparent that many black Africans were domestic slaves on the islands.

The institution of slavery in Malta reached its apex during the period of Hospitaller rule between 1530 and 1798, when it took on unprecedented proportions and was largely maintained through commerce raids against enemy shipping and coastal targets by the Hospitaller navy and Malta-based corsairs. This led to an influx of mostly Muslim prisoners as slaves, but there were also lesser numbers of Jewish, Christian and black African slaves on the islands. Some were forced to work as galley slaves while others worked on land as labourers and had a variety of duties ranging from manufacturing to domestic roles.

Around the same time, there were Maltese people enslaved in North Africa and the Ottoman Empire after being captured during attacks on the islands or on Christian shipping, including in raids by the Barbary corsairs. Thousands were enslaved en masse during a major attack on Malta in 1429 and one on Gozo in 1551; these and other raids had a lasting impact on the islands' demographics and folklore.

When Hospitaller rule ended with the French occupation of Malta in 1798, slavery was abolished through a decree by Napoleon. Although French rule in Malta was short-lived, the abolition was upheld and confirmed by local rebel authorities in 1800 and by the British protectorate in 1812.

== Antiquity and Middle Ages ==
Slavery existed in the Maltese Islands from antiquity. Successive powers that controlled the archipelago prior to the arrival of the Hospitallers in 1530—including the Romans, Byzantines, Arabs and Sicilians—all using slave labour.

=== Roman rule ===
After the Roman Republic captured Malta from the Carthaginians during the Second Punic War in 218 BC, prisoners who were not of noble birth were sold as slaves in Lilybaeum, Sicily.

=== Arab rule ===
Malta was conquered by the Aghlabids in 870 AD, and during the conquest the islands' main settlement of Melite was destroyed and its inhabitants were massacred. It is possible that the islands were depopulated for some time after this attack, and what remained of the islands' pre-870 Christian population might have converted to Islam, become dhimmi, or were enslaved.

According to the chronicler al-Himyarī, in 1048–1049 a Muslim settlement which became the city of Mdina was established on the site of Melite. The settlers included at least a few hundred slaves, and while sources do not specify their ethnicity or religion, it has been speculated that the slaves might have been Arabic-speaking Sicilian or Slavic Christians, or recent converts to Islam from Christianity. They might have also assimilated any surviving descendants of the indigenous population who had survived the events of 870 AD.

In 1053–1054, these slaves aided the Muslim settlers in successfully repelling a Byzantine attack, and were granted freedom as a result. Al-Himyarī stated that at the time the Muslims had around 400 fighting men, but were outnumbered by the slaves.

After the successful Norman invasion of Malta occurred in 1091, the Normans freed many Christian slaves from Malta and took them to Sicily, after which the freed slaves crossed the Straits of Messina and returned to their homelands. Surviving sources once again do not specify the ethnicities of these slaves, but it has been speculated that they might have been from mainland Italy or Greece.

=== Kingdom of Sicily ===
In the late medieval period, maritime brigandage was widely practiced throughout the Mediterranean, and the Maltese Islands were used as a base for corsairing by the Genoese. In the 13th century Genoese corsair Enrico Pescatore ruled the archipelago as Count of Malta. Genoese and Maltese corsairs added human captives to their loot, including black Africans who had been previously enslaved.

Maltese documents attest to the presence of domestic slaves in the 13th and 14th centuries. For example, a Greek slave woman, Catherina, was emancipated through a notarial deed dated 23 January 1342. However, it seems that prior to the beginning of Hospitaller rule in 1530, the majority of domestic slaves in Malta were black Africans, usually described in sources as Ethiopians. These may have been captured by Maghrebis along the southern border of their territories.

By the end of 15th century, there were such slaves in the service of wealthy families in Mdina as well as in the countryside and in Gozo, where for example the priest Pietru Mannara sold a slave named Ferha to a compatriot. There appears to have been a custom of baptising slaves upon their arrival to Malta.

== Hospitaller rule ==
Malta was ruled by the Knights Hospitaller, also known as the Order of St. John, between 1530 and 1798. During this period, slavery was widely practiced in both Christian and Muslim-ruled parts of the Mediterranean, and it was regarded as an ethically acceptable institution which was regulated by governments. Slavery was seen as a source of labour, and it formed a key part of Hospitaller Malta's economy.

=== Corsairing ===
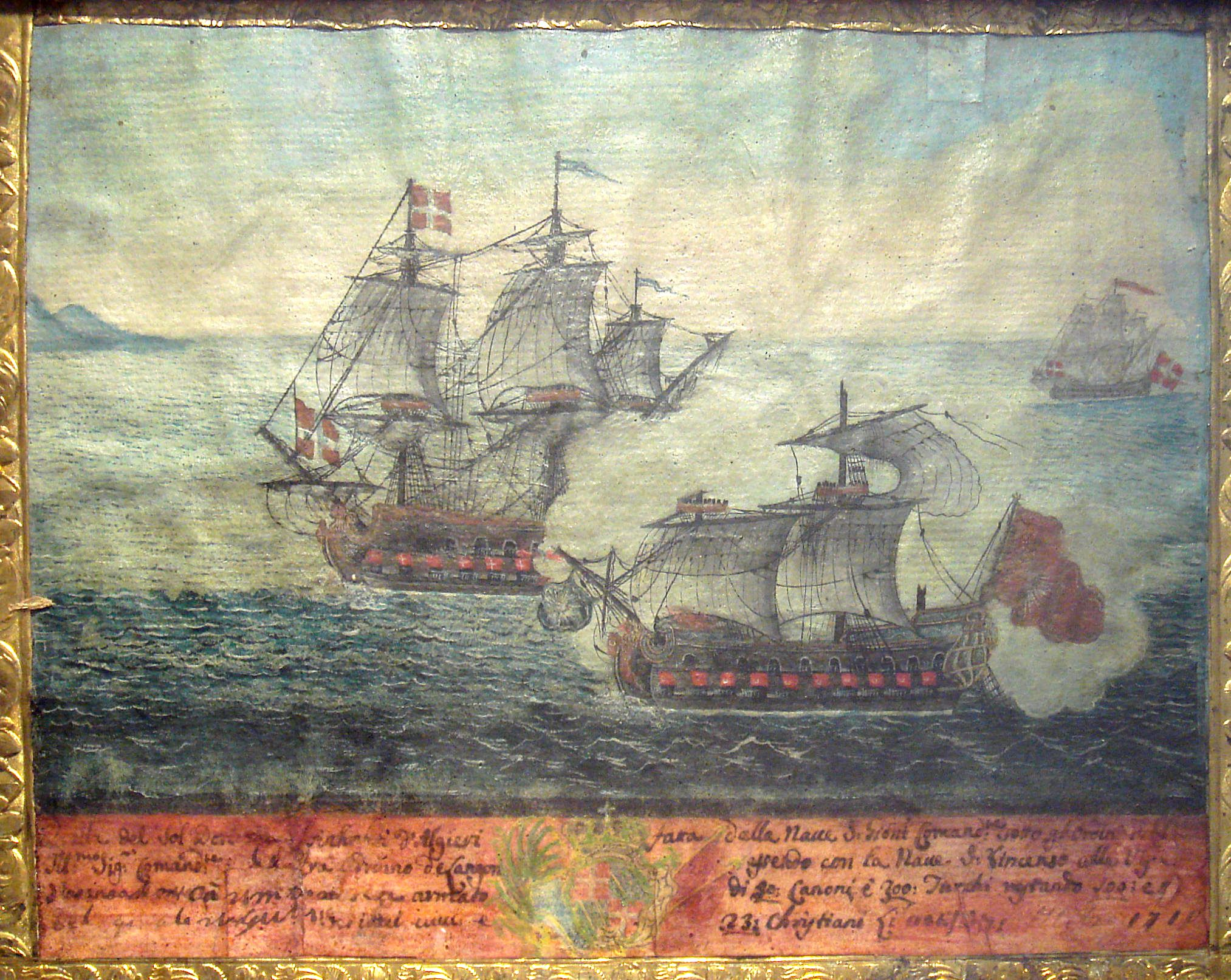
Painting of a Hospitaller ship engaging an Algerian vessel, 1719

Corsairing (Italian: corso) was a pivotal part of the Maltese Islands' economy throughout the period of Hospitaller rule. The majority of slaves in Hospitaller Malta were acquired during corsair raids on enemy shipping or coastal targets, and this economic-military model allowed the system of slavery to be maintained from the 16th to the 18th centuries. Malta's capital Valletta has been described as one of the Mediterranean's key centres for corsairing during the early modern era, similar to Livorno and their Muslim counterpart Algiers.

The Order would issue letters of marque allowing private ships to fly its flag and capture enemy shipping in their name, taking captured ships' cargo as plunder and their crews as slaves. These corsairs included both native Maltese and other Europeans, such as Italians, French and Spaniards. Some wealthy Hospitaller knights who owned their own vessels—such as Hugues Loubenx de Verdalle and Alof de Wignacourt, both of whom rose to lead the Order as Grand Masters—also personally participated in corsairing.

In addition, the Hospitallers maintained their own fleet of galleys and other vessels which would be sent out each year to pursue Muslim merchant shipping and raid undefended coastal settlements. During the 16th and 17th centuries they raided as far as the Eastern Mediterranean, capturing ships headed from Alexandria and Levantine ports to the Ottoman capital of Constantinople. The Hospitaller fleet raided isolated garrisons and settlements along the North African coast as well as in Greece and Anatolia. Following the fall of Candia to the Ottomans in 1669, the Hospitaller fleet and Malta-based corsairs tended to limit their activities to the western and central Mediterranean, directing their efforts towards fighting their Muslim rivals, the Barbary corsairs.

By the 18th century, corsairing was on the decline in much of the Mediterranean, but the practice persisted in Malta even as other ports reoriented themselves towards safer and more lucrative economic activities such as trade. The Hospitallers used the pretext of a perpetual holy war against Islam as a justification for their corsairing activities, but in practice captains of ships were ordered to sail the seas and plunder for profit. Even Christian Greek ships could be captured under the pretext that they were schismatics trading with the Turks.

=== Slave trade ===
From 1530 to 1551, the Hospitallers also ruled Tripoli on the North African coast, facilitating the importation of black African slaves from North African slave markets to nearby Malta and Sicily. There are also records of French ships carrying black slaves from North Africa to Ottoman slave markets stopping at Malta during the 18th century.

People captured by the Hospitaller fleet or by corsairs during raids were considered to be slaves, and when cargo of captured ships included black Africans who had already been slaves, these would simply change ownership, while their former masters also became slaves. Like all other travelers arriving to Malta from the sea, slaves were initially quarantined upon ships or in the Lazzaretto of Manoel Island. The captives were then triaged according to sex, age and robustness, these qualities being assessed in order to determine their market value. If the slaves were captured by a ship belonging to the Order, the knights decided their respective destinations: the galleys, domestic service, gift or sale. If they had been captured by a licensed ship, the captain would pay the Order a certain percentage before disposing the balance as he pleased.

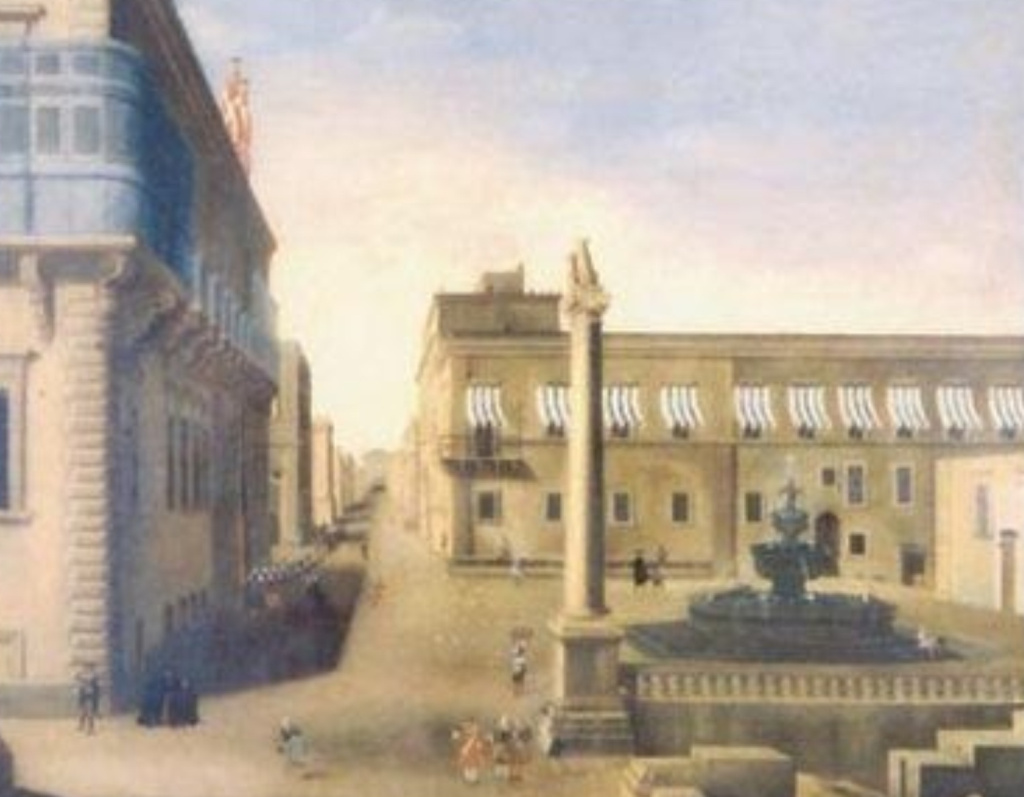
18th century painting of Piazza San Giorgio in Valletta, the site of the slave market

Slaves in Malta were viewed as saleable objects, and were referred to as merchandise in the penal code of 1724. They were auctioned off at a public slave market in Valletta, which was situated at Piazza San Giorgio, the city's main square in front of the Grandmaster's Palace. At the time, similar markets also existed in Christian Mediterranean ports such as Genoa, Messina, Livorno and Naples. Slaves were also traded abroad or could be given as gifts; for example several female slaves were gifted by the Hospitallers to the vice-reine of Naples between 1637 and 1655. The English Royal Navy considered purchasing slaves from Malta for its Mediterranean Fleet in the 17th century, while the Papal Navy regularly bought Muslim slaves from anyone who could provide them, including from the Hospitallers. 100 slaves were sent to the Pope in 1662 for service in his navy, while 40 others were presented to the Pope in 1720 after the Ottoman sultan requested the Papacy to send Muslim slaves to repair the Church of the Holy Sepulchre in Jerusalem.

In around 1660, more than 700 slaves were disembarked on the island, 538 of whom were quickly sold for an average price of 142 scudi for a man and 159 scudi for a woman. Prices continued to increase until the beginning of the 18th century, then stabilised as demand for galley slaves decreased by the middle of the century as the great powers, including the French Navy, dismantled their galley fleets. Despite this, the Hospitaller fleet in Malta continued to use galley slaves until the end of the century.

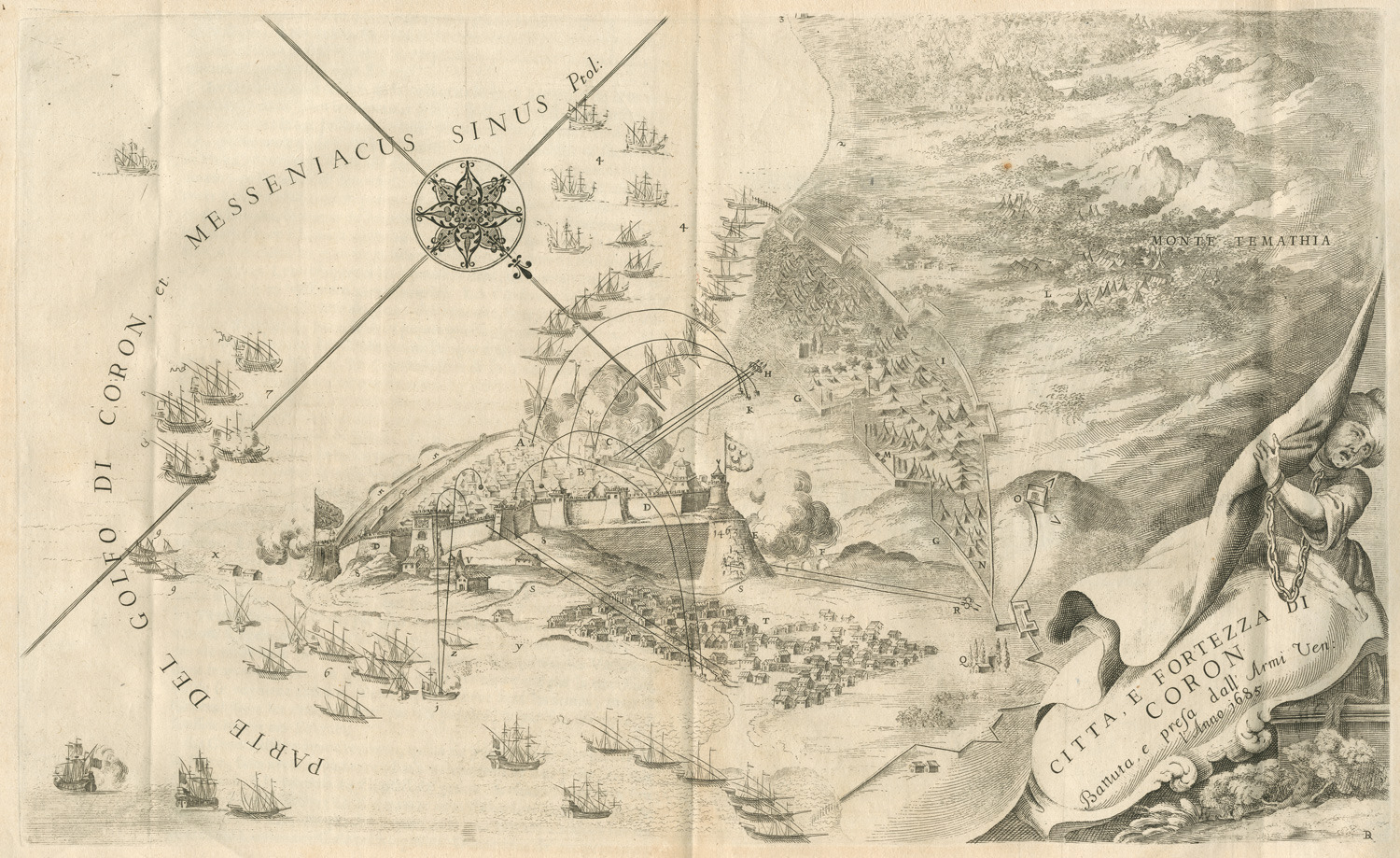
Map of Coron during the 1685 siege, as depicted by Vincenzo Coronelli

An example of how the slave trade operated in practice can be seen in the events that occurred after the 1685 siege of Coron in the Peloponnese, in which the Hospitallers supported the Venetians against the city's Ottoman defenders. Official figures indicate that after the city surrendered, 1,336 Turkish and Jewish inhabitants were taken as slaves and were divided between the various members of the Christian coalition, with the Hospitallers taking 223 captives. Despite this, the knights, soldiers and seamen of the Order's fleet clandestinely carried away more captives into slavery, bringing the total number to more than 500. Some of the captives were sold at Italian and Sicilian ports, including Gallipoli and Augusta, while the rest reached Malta in September 1685. At this point the Order declared that all slaves belonged to its Treasury and initiated proceedings against individuals who had clandestinely kept slaves for themselves or who had sold them without the Order's permission. The Order's records indicate that 284 slaves were consigned to its Treasury.

Only 60 of the captives who landed in Malta were adult men, and 36 of them were deemed to be capable of rowing on the Order's galleys. The remainder were women and children, making the influx of slaves from Coron an unusual event as the majority of slaves in Malta tended to be men. Some of the slaves were then sold privately or were given to individuals, while the majority are believed to have been sold through public auction. Records indicate that one 8-year-old girl was sold to a Muslim slave who attempted to set her free. However, the Treasury confiscated her and the girl was sold to a Hospitaller knight for 43 scudi. Surviving records do not indicate the fate of all the Coronese captives, but many of the Jewish slaves were freed in 1686 and 1687 while some of the Turks were freed in the 1690s; most of them are believed to have gone to North Africa as Coron remained under Venetian occupation at the time.

Between 1790 and 1798, some 440 Muslim and Jewish slaves were captured by vessels of the Hospitaller fleet, while 1,023 others were captured by corsairs. Some 994 slaves were also released during the same period. The last slave auction in Malta was held in 1797.

=== Demographics ===
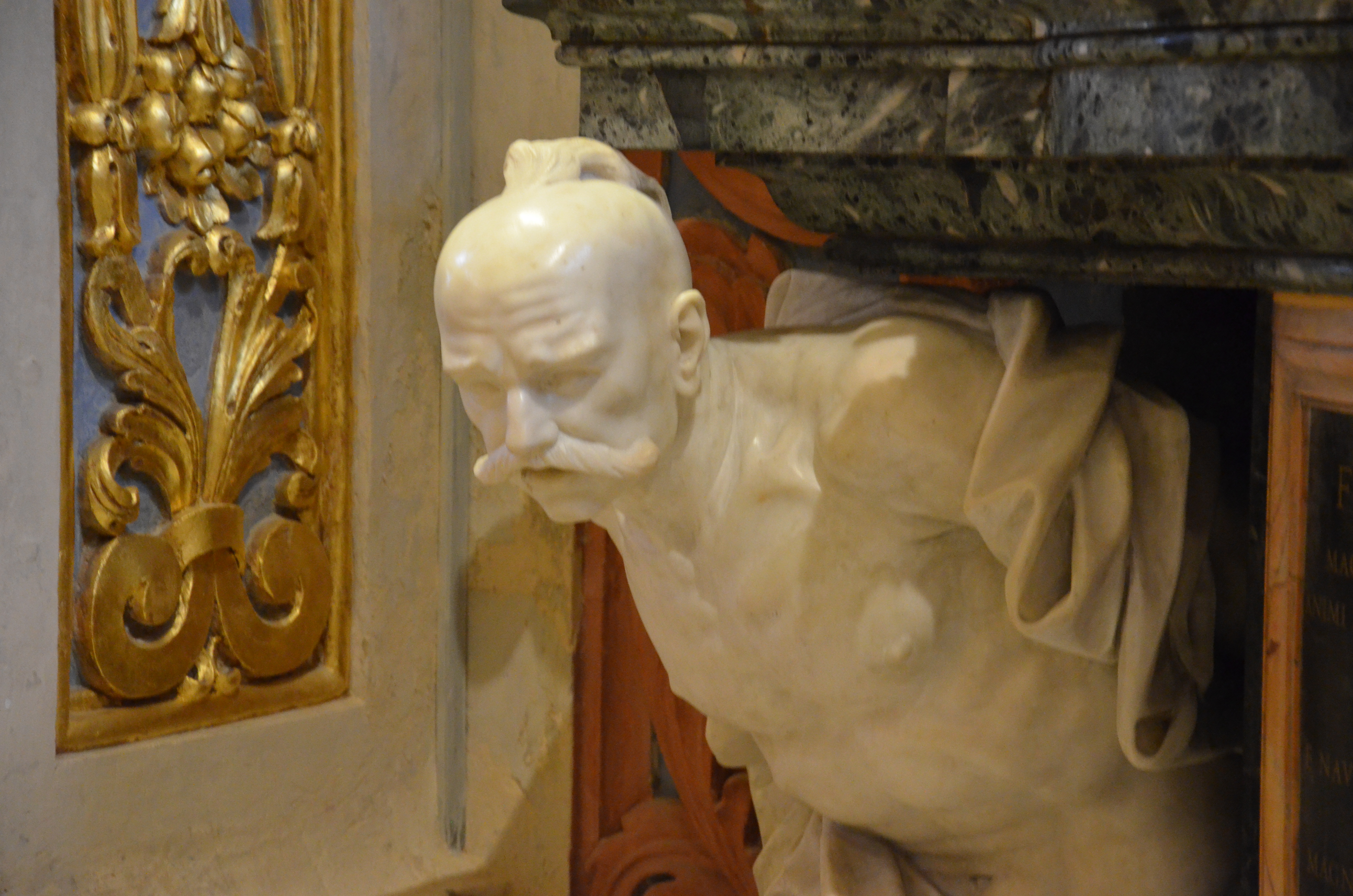
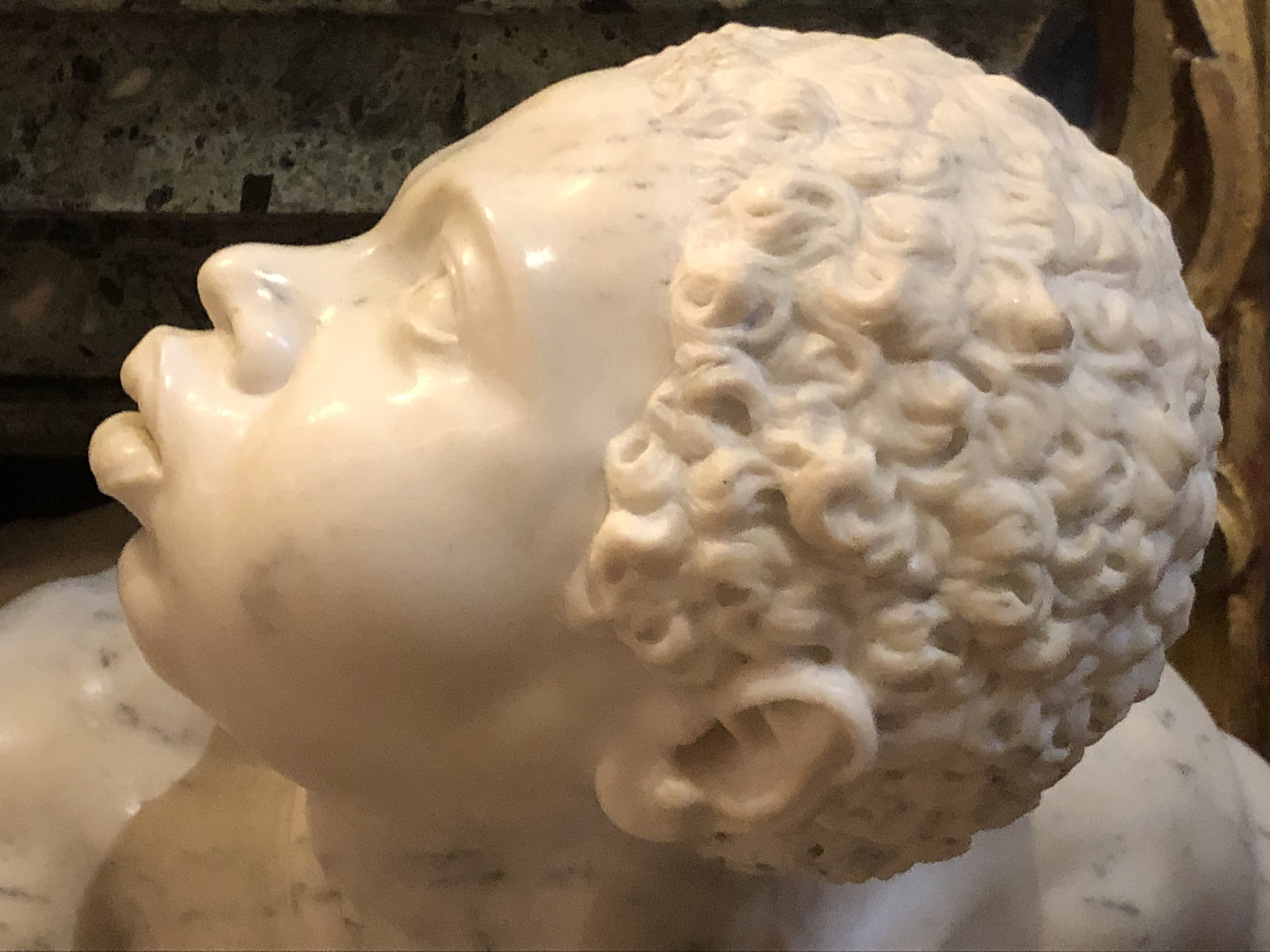
Details from the 17th-century funerary monument of Nicolás Cotoner at St John's Co-Cathedral, Valletta, Malta, including statues of a Muslim slave (top) and an African slave (bottom)

The number of slaves in Malta during the period of Hospitaller rule ranged from a few hundred to a few thousand:

Year	Total number of slaves	Total population of Malta	Percentage of slaves within the population
1548	less than 400	20,000	2%
1569	around 400	11,970	3.3%
1575	400	around 16,000	2.5%
1582	800	22,000	3.6%
1590	1,405	32,310	4.3%
1599	around 1,800	around 21,000	8.5%
1632	2,046	43,000	4.7%
1669	2,390	around 40,000	5.9%
1710	3,000	around 50,000	6%
1741	2,500	around 60,000	4.2%
1769	2,500	around 70,000	3.5%
1798	around 2,000	around 100,000	2%

Approximately 80% of slaves were Muslims or Jews, who were usually captured by the Order during military conflicts or later during corsair raids. Most of the Muslims were Turks, Moors or captured Barbary corsairs, but there were also limited numbers of black Sub-Saharan Africans. Jews came from the Levant, the Aegean Islands, Rhodes, Crete or Venice.

The remaining 20% were Christians, who mainly came from Greece, the Middle East or Central Europe and may have already been slaves at the time of their capture. They would have to prove their religion before being freed from servitude, but they may have also remained slaves. Over time and as dictated by need, Greeks were captured and held in slavery as schismatics, or on the pretext that they would trade with the Turks. The Christian slave population also included former Muslims and Jews who converted to Catholicism while in Malta, and the children of slaves born on the islands who were often baptised as Christians at birth.

The vast majority of slaves in Hospitaller Malta were men. Among slaves who appeared in Inquisition tribunals during the 16th century, only 10% were women, while a 1645 survey revealed that at the time there were only 100 female slaves in Malta. This imbalance appears to be because most slaves were captured at sea, thus they would have likely been male sailors, privateers or soldiers. However, women and children could be victims of raids on enemy coasts, and on rare occasions large numbers of women and children were enslaved in a single event, as was the case following the 1685 capture of Coron.

People of any age could be slaves, from infants to the elderly. It is difficult to assess an average age, but among slaves mentioned in Inquisition records between 1581 and 1601, the average age was determined to be 31 years old.

Slaves performed a wide variety of duties, with the most robust being destined for the galleys, while others remained on land and worked in domestic roles, as servants, cooks, and workers.

=== Galley slaves ===
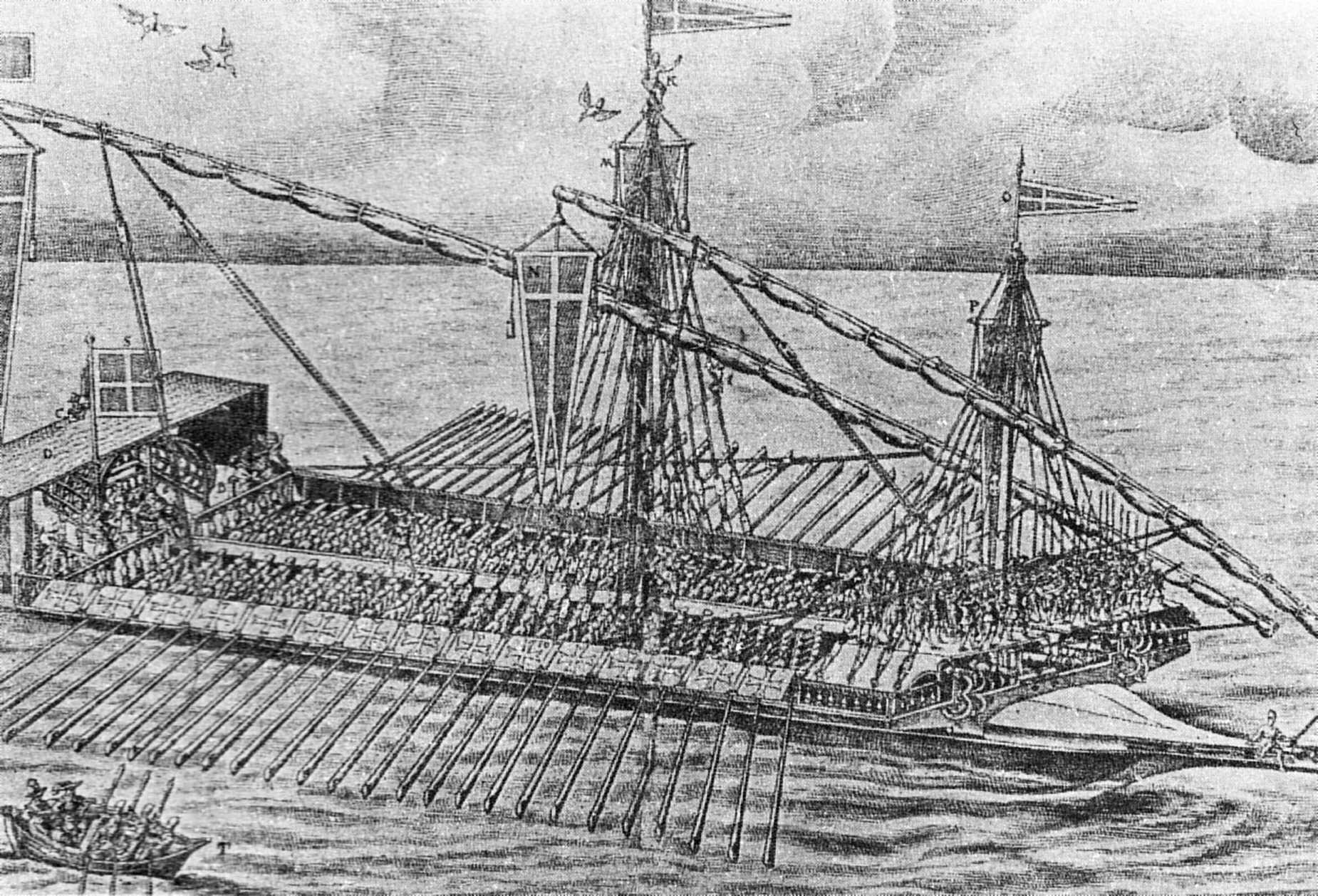
Illustration of a 17th-century galley of the Hospitaller fleet

Throughout its rule in Malta, the Order maintained a fleet which mainly consisted of oared galleys. This created a demand for galley slaves, and one of the primary objectives of corsairing was precisely to acquire slaves to man these vessels. Upon the arrival of a group of slaves in Malta, the strongest men would usually be selected to become rowers, and they were regarded as exclusive property of the Order. Land-bound slaves were sometimes also sent to the galleys when the necessity arose.

Not all rowers in the Hospitaller fleet were slaves, but some were convicts from various European countries while others were volunteers known as buonavoglia. The latter had entered contracts with the Order's Treasury as a form of debt bondage. These Christian rowers were not slaves, and were generally expected to keep a watch over the Muslim or Jewish galley slaves. Free Maltese rowers were sometimes also employed on galleys, especially when the Hospitallers faced a lack of manpower.

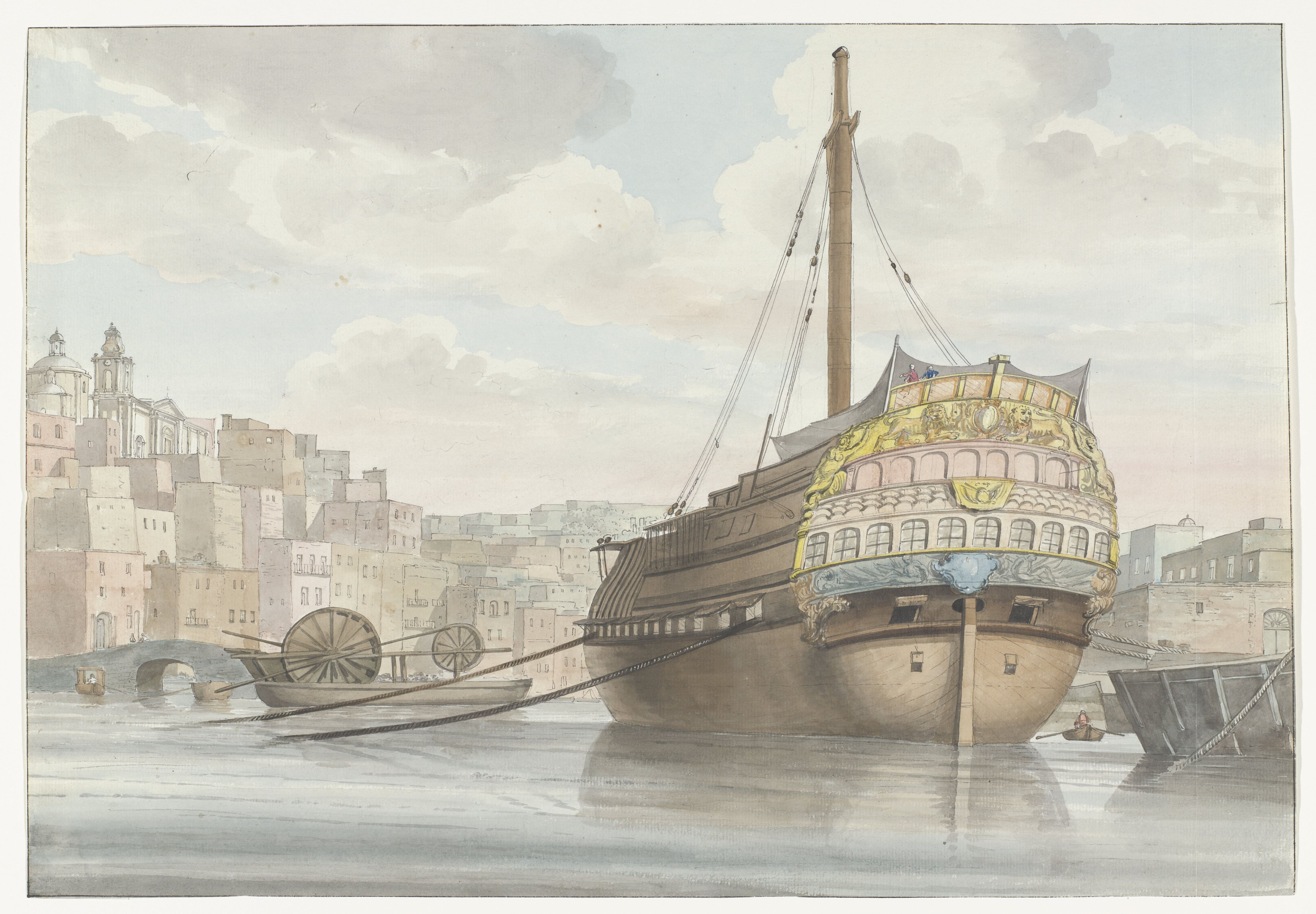
Malta's galley harbour as painted by Abraham-Louis-Rodolphe Ducros, 1778

Initially, non-Christian slaves constituted a minority of the total number of rowers on a galley for security reasons and for fear of mutiny. For example, the Order's three galleys in 1579 were collectively crewed by 277 buonavoglia, 216 convicts and 200 slaves. However, the proportion of slaves among the rowers later increased significantly, rising from 30% in 1548 to 71% in 1669. At the height of their power in mid-17th century, the Hospitallers required around 1,500 galley slaves along with 500 other slaves to man their other ships.

Since the Hospitaller fleet depended on these rowers, the Order concerned itself with the health of its galley slaves. Managers were appointed to ensure that the slaves were properly clothed and fed with daily rations of soup and biscuits, with bread and meat twice a week. Despite this, conditions were harsh and mortality was high. Hundreds of galley slaves drowned when four galleys sank in a tornado in the 1550s.

=== Land-based labourers and domestic slaves ===
Female slaves along with male slaves who were not deemed to be fit for work on the galleys were assigned various types of domestic, agricultural or construction work on land. Black slaves in particular were often assigned domestic roles as they were generally not regarded as suitable for the galleys.

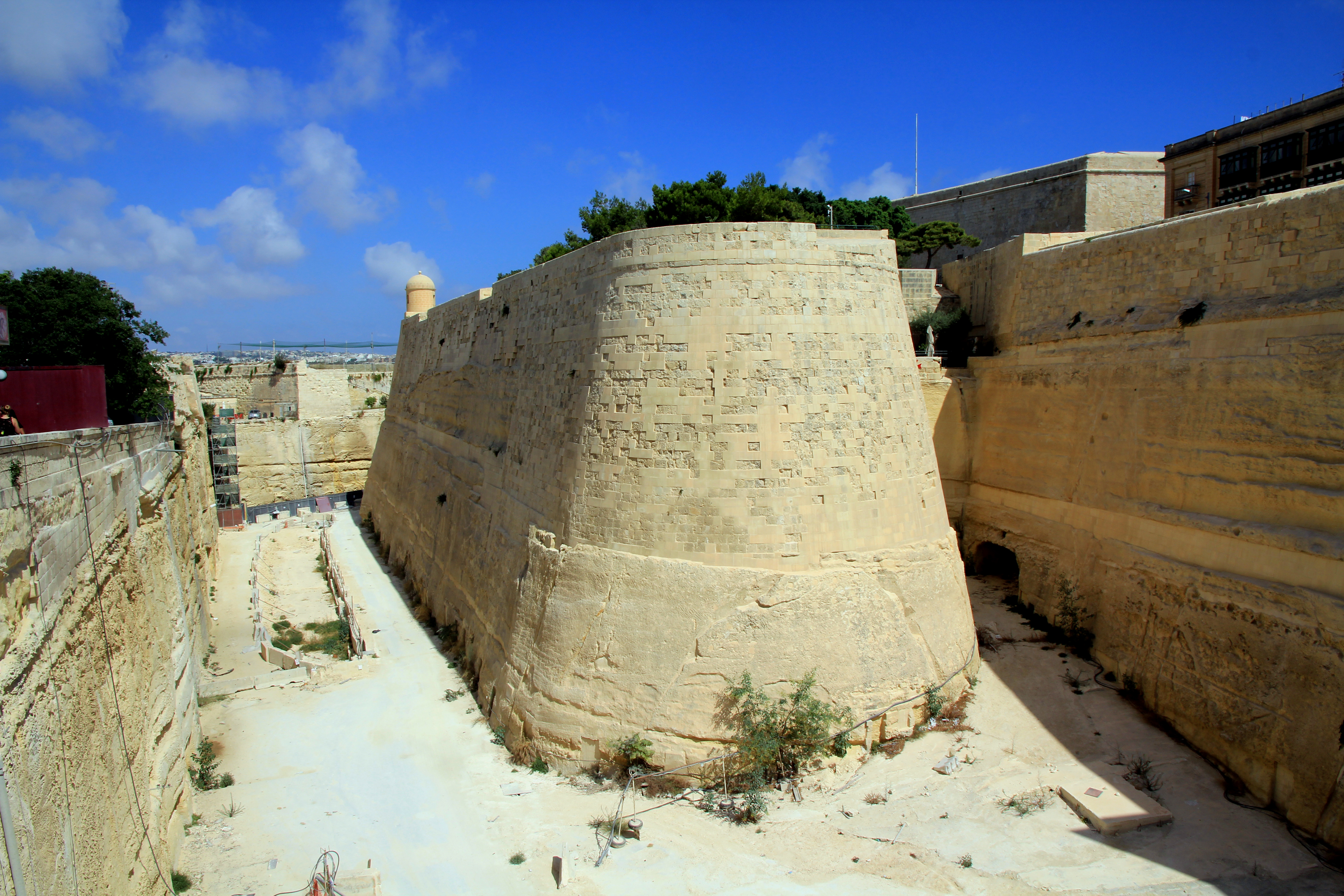
The ditch of the fortifications of Valletta, which was partly excavated using slave labour in the 1560s

The Order's slaves were forced to work in construction, and galley slaves were sometimes temporarily assigned duties on land when labour was required for large-scale construction projects. During the building of fortifications, slaves were usually assigned menial tasks such as removal and carting away of rubble, while construction was generally done by skilled workers employed by contractors. In January 1547, slaves were ordered to carry out repair works at Fort St. Angelo. A few hundred Muslim slaves captured during the 1565 Great Siege of Malta were involved in the construction of the new capital city of Valletta, including the excavation of the fortress's ditch. Slave labour was also used in the construction of the Wignacourt Aqueduct in the early 17th century.

Slaves also performed a wide variety of other land-based roles, including being involved in the manufacturing of armaments in the Order's foundry, maintenance of weapons in the Palace Armoury, shipbuilding, manufacturing cloth for ships' sails, loading and unloading of ships, or in the operations of the Sacra Infermeria and the Forni della Signoria. Some were given domestic roles in the Order's palaces and auberges. Muslim slaves worked alongside Christian convicts or employees in several of these roles. In 1635, up to 600 slaves worked as artisans or labourers in Valletta and Senglea alone.

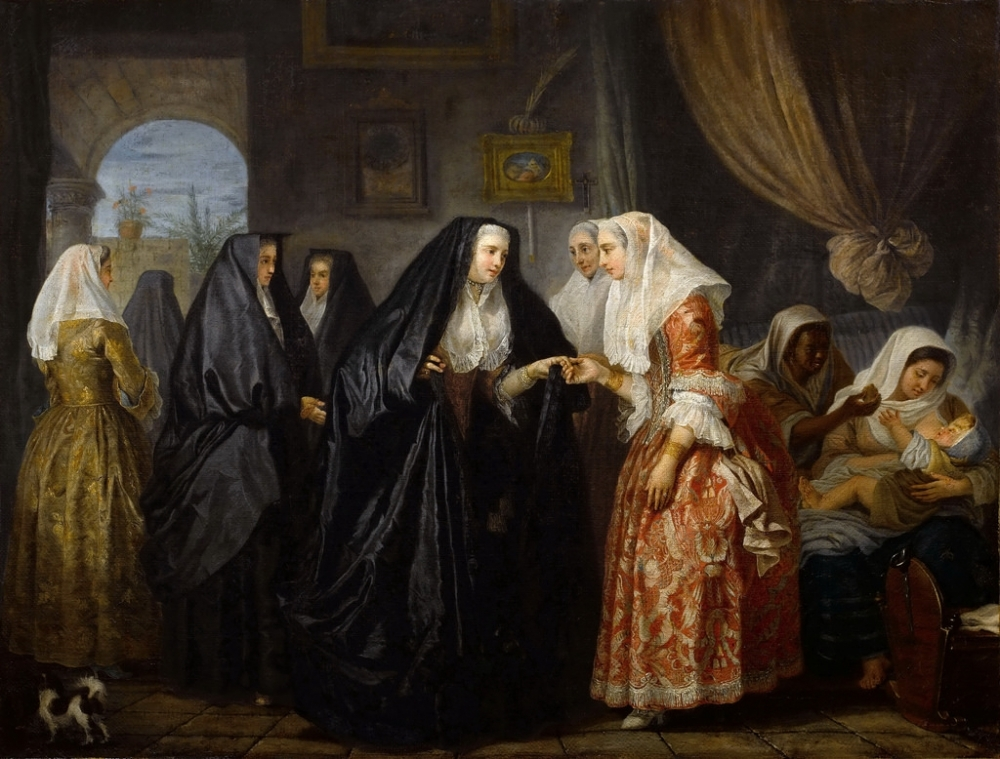
Bourgeoise Maltese ladies with a black slave woman at right, as depicted in an 18th-century painting by Antoine de Favray

Domestic slavery was common both in the urban areas around the Grand Harbour (namely Valletta and the Three Cities) and in the countryside. In the cities, both male and female slaves appear to have worked in housekeeping, while in the countryside, female slaves were generally assigned tasks such as cooking, cleaning and serving, while men worked in agriculture. The Grand Master's palaces were staffed by both free employees and slaves. From 1555, Grand Masters had the right to 30 slaves for their personal service. This figure increased to more than 50 slaves in 1568, and Grand Master Hugues Loubenx de Verdalle had 230 slaves in his service at the time of his death in 1595.

Not all slaves belonged to the Order, as any individual could purchase slaves at auction. Some Hospitaller knights owned their own slaves, while some rented publicly owned slaves for 18 tarì per month. Knights were forbidden from purchasing female slaves aged younger than 55, but there are several records of this rule being infringed. The Maltese also purchased slaves, and it was common practice for members of the local nobility and professionals and notables such as physicians, advocates, priests, soldiers and merchants to own a few slaves. Examples of Maltese slave owners from the Hospitaller period include the family of architect Girolamo Cassar, chemist and benefactor Caterina Vitale, landowner Clemente Tabone, and noblewoman Cosmana Navarra. Italian artists Caravaggio and Mattia Preti, both Hospitaller knights, also owned slaves while living in Malta.

=== Treatment of slaves ===
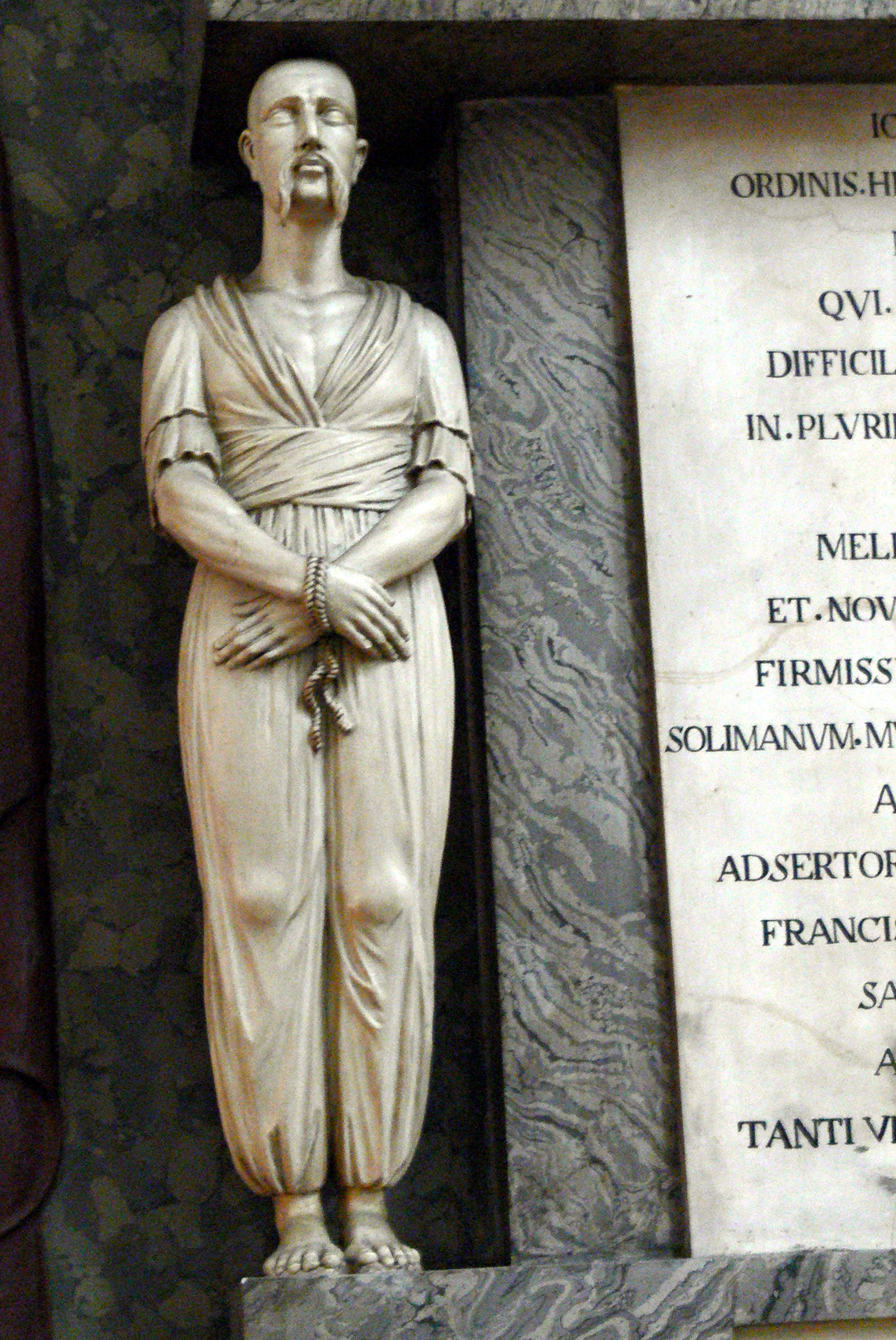
Statue of a captive Turk with a shaved head, from an 1806 monument to Jean Parisot de Valette at the Maltese Church, Vienna

Between 1530 and 1602, the Order sought to regulate slavery by a series of magisterial ordinances which governed every moment of the slaves' lives. There were laws which obliged masters to provide slaves with adequate food and clothing, but the clothes they wore indicated their status, and male slaves were forced to shave their heads except for a ponytail. By the 1770s, black female slaves who attended Maltese ladies typically wore clothes which were similar to those worn by their mistresses but were made of inferior materials.

The presence of Muslim slaves in Hospitaller Malta posed a security risk for the Order, as most slaves were adult men, including former soldiers, without much hope for a future in a Christian territory which was at constant war against the Ottomans and the Barbary states. At night publicly owned slaves were locked up in slave prisons known as bagnios. There were three such prisons in the Grand Harbour area: the Gran Prigione in Valletta which housed galley slaves and Muslims along with convicts, and smaller prisons in the cities of Birgu and Senglea; Jewish slaves were held at the Birgu prison. A fourth bagnio existed in the inland city of Mdina.

The Gran Prigione (labelled "41") as depicted on a mid-17th century map of Valletta. The building was destroyed during World War II, and a block of apartments was constructed in its place.

Slaves were not obliged to work when they were ill, and publicly owned male slaves benefited from the Order's medical care in case of injury or illness. Such care was likely motivated by economic interests as slaves were regarded as valuable commodities. After the Order moved its capital to Valletta and built a hospital in the new city, an older infirmary which had been built in Birgu in 1533 was repurposed as a hospital for slaves from 1573. This was no longer in use by the time of the 1592–1593 plague epidemic, and galley slaves were subsequently cared for at the Valletta Sacra Infermeria along with other patients. Travelers' descriptions from the 17th and 18th centuries describe the hospital as a clean and well-kept place. From at least the 1630s onwards, the Valletta bagnio also had its own infirmary. Female slaves were not treated at Order's infirmaries, but were presumably treated in their owners' homes when they fell ill.

Slaves were allowed to have their own small businesses and to earn some money, subject to restrictions imposed by the Hospitallers. Some slaves worked as barbers within the Valletta bagnio, while others sold goods or drinks in the bagnio or in the streets of the city.

Hospitaller sources state that many Muslim slaves took opium even though this was illegal. By 1631, slaves caught in possession of opium received corporal punishments while pharmacists caught selling opium to slaves were fined or tortured with strappado in case of repeated offences. In the 1724 legal code, anyone caught in possession of illicit opium was liable to the death penalty.

Slaves could be subjected to harsh physical punishments, although there were laws that protected slaves against abuse by their owners. Slaves were subjected to public floggings while tied to a stone column at Piazza San Giorgio in Valletta, and were sometimes paraded around the city on a cart while being repeatedly burnt with a branding iron.

Muslim slaves who died in Malta were buried in dedicated cemeteries in the area around Marsa. A cemetery in il-Menqa contained the graves of slaves as well as Ottoman soldiers killed in the Great Siege of Malta of 1565. This cemetery was replaced in 1675 by another one near Spencer Hill (Via della Croce), following the construction of the Floriana Lines. The latter was destroyed in 1865 to make way for road works, and human remains believed to originate from one of these cemeteries were discovered during further road works in 2012.

=== Social life and integration ===
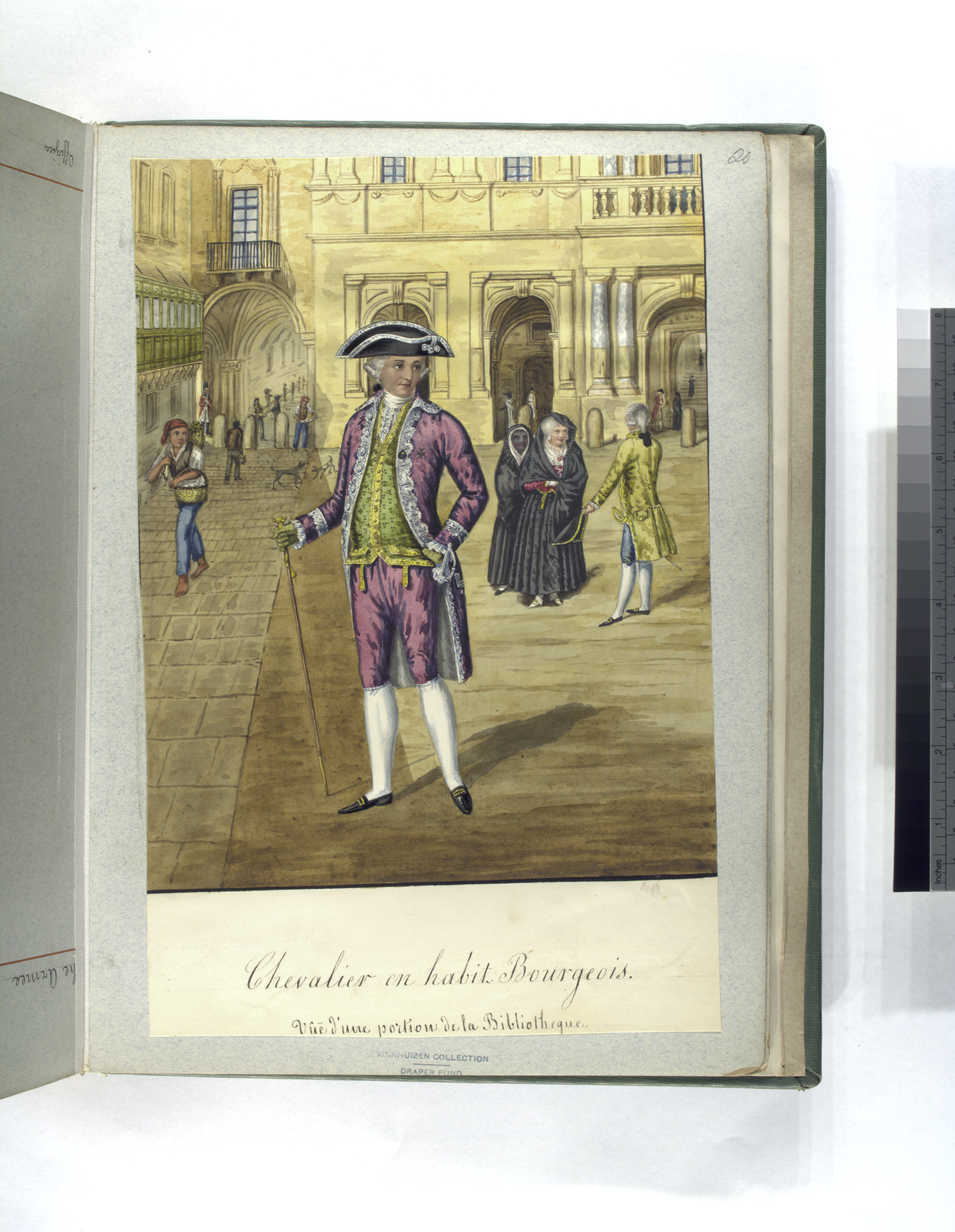
Detail from an 18th-century painting depicting a lady and a slave woman, both wearing the għonnella, in Piazza Tesoreria, Valletta

Due to their status and religion, slaves were isolated and marginalised in relation to the rest of Maltese society. The main places where slaves could socialise with each other were the prisons where they would be kept every evening. There they could speak in their native languages and they were allowed to practice their faith, with part of the prison housing a mosque. Despite this, missionaries made attempts to convert slaves to Roman Catholicism and some Muslim slaves did convert in a bid to improve their conditions. Such converts were not freed but they did receive some material benefits, such as better-quality bread, although this generally led to them being rejected by other Muslims. During the day, taverns within the cities around the Grand Harbour served as meeting places for slaves who were not working, where they would drink, meet prostitutes or plot escapes.

Some slaves, particularly those belonging to private individuals, did manage to establish social links and integrate into Maltese society. Slaves were allowed to own and sell property under the control of the Order. While there were linguistic barriers between slaves and Hospitaller knights who spoke various European languages such as Italian or French, the linguistic similarity between the Maltese language and Tunisian Arabic facilitated communication between native Maltese and Barbary slaves. There is also evidence of some hostilities between slaves and the Maltese—with a number of instances of female Muslim slaves openly quarrelling with or insulting Maltese women, including their own mistresses—being recorded from the 18th century.

Marriages between slaves and Maltese were uncommon but not exceptional occurrences. A partial survey of Maltese parish registers revealed that a few hundred such marriages took place between the 16th and 18th centuries, including male slaves marrying Maltese women and female slaves marrying Maltese men. An over-representation the latter compared to their relatively low numbers may indicate that for women, union with a Maltese man might have been a fairly frequent outcome of their state of slavery. It might also be indicative of the practice of sexual slavery in Malta. Church records relating to the baptism of female slaves' offspring usually mention the mother and her owner by name but do not mention any father; this suggests that concubinage was prevalent, as the owners themselves had likely fathered the children being baptised. If any Hospitaller knights fathered children with female slaves, they could not admit doing so as they were bound by a vow of chastity.

One example of former slaves and their children becoming part of Maltese society is architect Carlo Gimach, whose ancestor was a Palestinian Muslim who became Christian after the Hospitallers enslaved him.

=== Redemption and emancipation ===
There were several ways through which a slave in Hospitaller Malta could be freed. The main way would have been for a slave to buy back their own freedom from their owners, but it would have not been easy for a slave to save the sum of money required as there were restrictions on slaves' economic activities. Towards the end of the 16th century, the average redemption price for a slave was 120 to 180 scudi, depending on the individual. Young women tended to command higher prices as they were regarded as objects of sexual desire, but their price decreased rapidly with their age.

High-ranking Ottomans who had been captured as slaves were ransomed by the sultanate. Slaves could also write to their families requesting them to pay a ransom to buy them back soon after capture. This was not always possible because high prices were set for ransoms, which were much higher than the market value of a slave in good health. Intermediaries were used to negotiate these ransoms and set up buybacks between Malta and Muslim countries. Former slaves who had obtained their freedom would have to pay a 10 scudi fee for safe conduct allowing them to leave Malta for a Muslim territory. Hospitaller records indicate that 757 safe conducts were granted between 1686 and 1706, 627 to men and 130 to women.

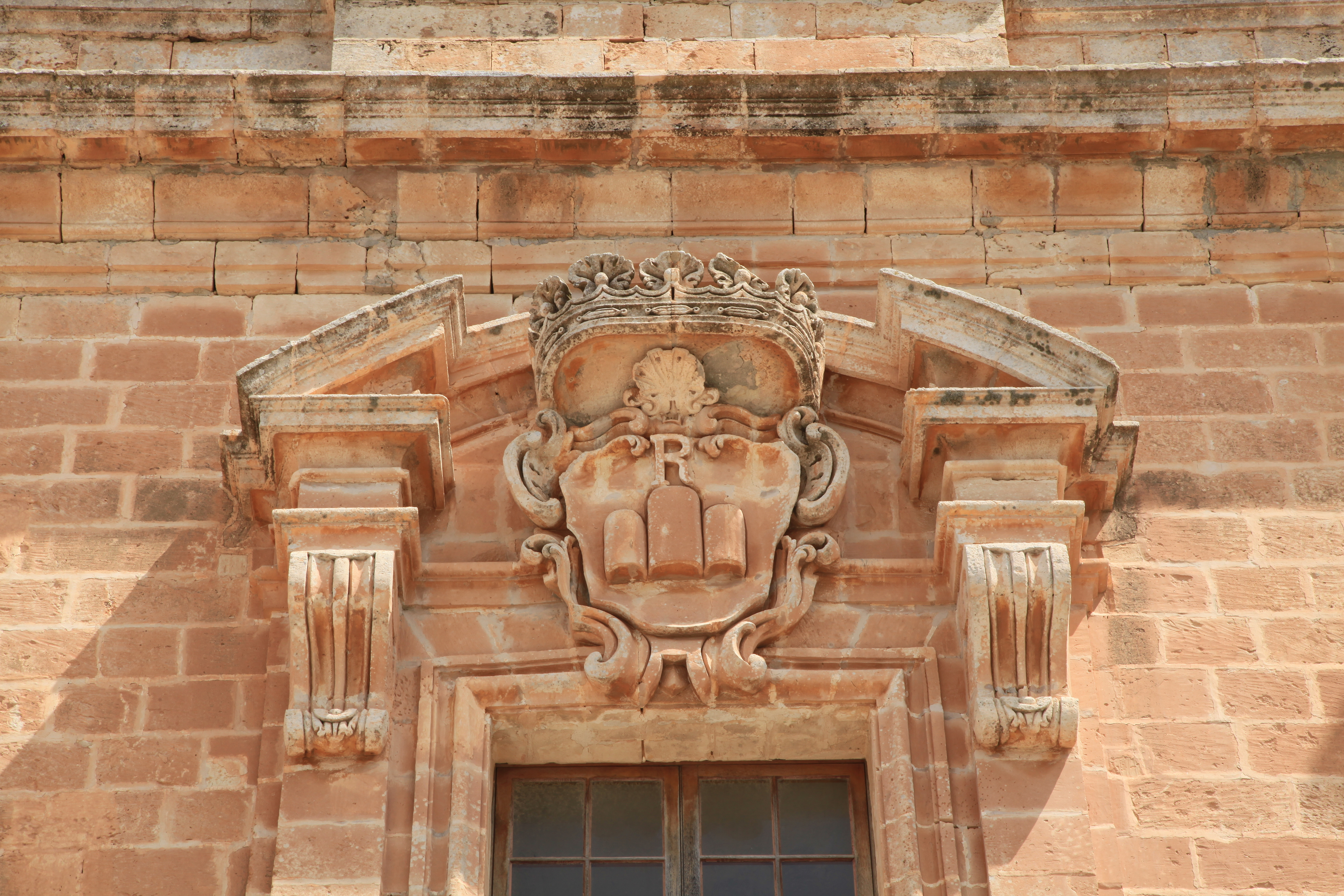
Coat of arms of the Monte della Redenzione degli Schiavi – an institution set up to redeem Maltese slaves enslaved by Muslims – on the façade of Selmun Palace

In some instances, the Hospitallers freed slaves in exchange for Maltese or other Christian slaves who had been held by Muslims. In others, Muslim states negotiated en masse redemptions through diplomatic channels. A charity which raised funds for ransoming Maltese slaves held in Muslim territories, the Monte della Redenzione degli Schiavi, was set up in 1607 by Grand Master Alof de Wignacourt. In 1769, the Moroccan sultan released 37 Tuscan slaves and sent them to Malta, from where they returned to their homeland. In return, Grand Master Manuel Pinto da Fonseca released 40 Muslim slaves to Morocco.

Towards the end of the 18th century, the Moroccan government began to ransom large numbers of Muslim slaves from Malta, including at least 199 slaves in 1782, and hundreds of slaves in 1786–1787 and in 1789. The latter was the largest mass ransom that ever occurred in Malta, and through it Order released all its Muslim slaves in exchange for a total of 548,680 scudi. Slaves who had converted to Christianity were not ransomed, and in the 1790s the Hospitaller fleet and private corsairs made efforts to capture new slaves in order to make up for those freed in 1789. A traveler to Tunis in 1788 noted that slave exchanges were rare, and when they did occur the Hospitallers would have to release two to four Muslim slaves for each Maltese.

Some slaves gained their freedom by marrying Maltese spouses. Others only regained their freedom after many years in Malta, with elderly slaves or those who were no longer fit to work sometimes being freed or sold for nominal sums and allowed to return to their native countries. Ageing slaves were often freed in their owners' wills. Since they would have lost contact with their homeland, sometimes former slaves chose to live out their lives on the islands. Freed slaves who remained in Malta often took the surname of their former master, sometimes with the addition of a prefix such as "de" or "di" to avoid ambiguity; their descendants usually dropped these prefixes from their surname.

=== Escapes and revolts ===
Since Malta is located relatively close to Tunisia, escape by sea was always a possibility. It is possible that escape attempts were relatively common during the 16th century, but were often stopped by the vigilance of coastal surveillance. In 1629, the Hospitallers built the Orsi Tower at the eastern mouth of the Grand Harbour in order to prevent such escapes, but this did not completely eliminate them. One such attempt is known to have occurred during the Christmas period of 1746.

Three attempts at slave rebellion are known to have occurred in Hospitaller Malta, in 1531, 1596 and 1749.

==== Revolt of 1531 ====
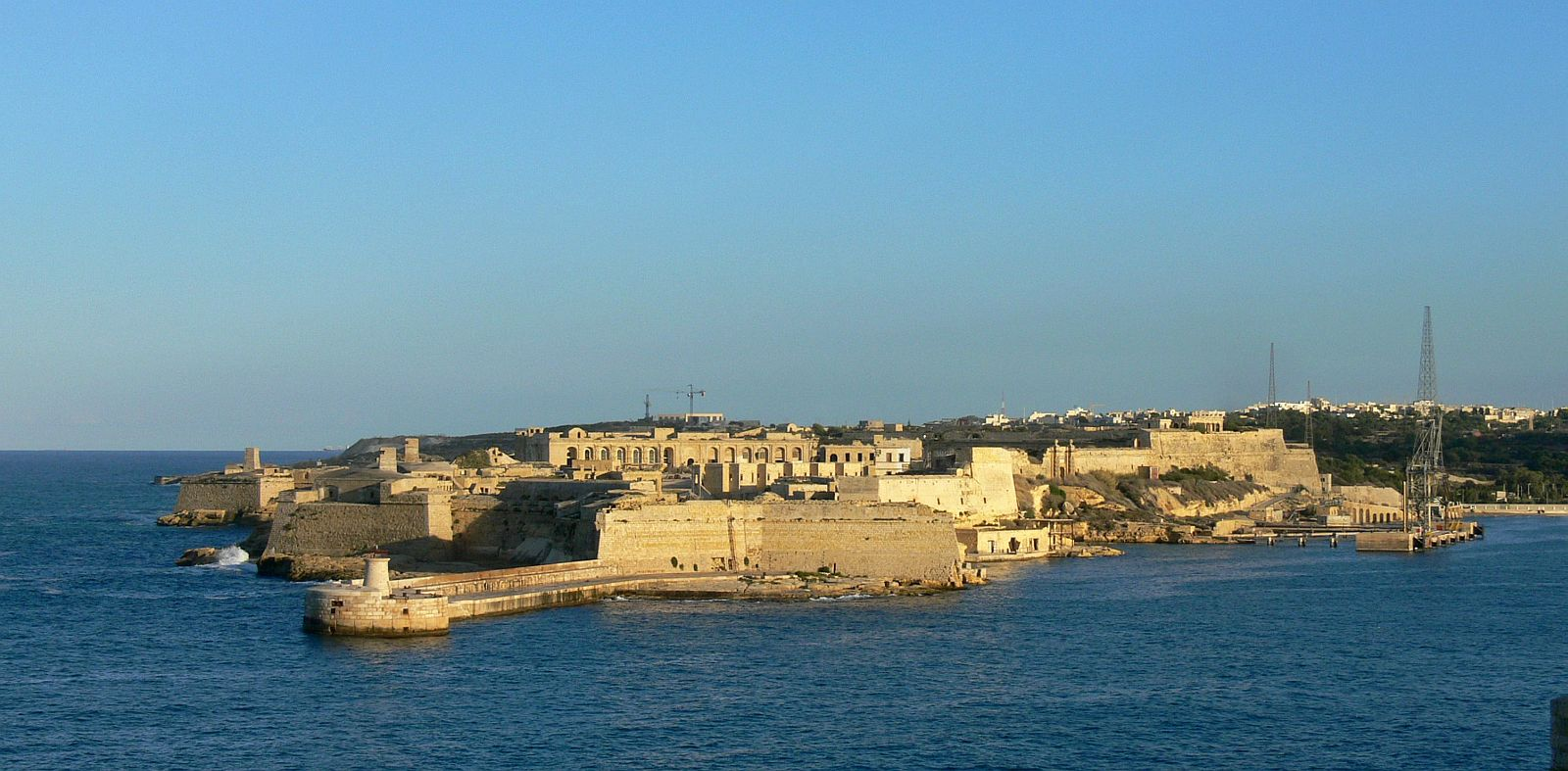
Fort Ricasoli at Gallows Point, where leaders of the 1531 revolt are said to have been executed

On 29 June 1531, less than a year after the Hospitallers' arrival in Malta, 16 slaves escaped the ramparts of Fort St. Angelo and then opened the doors of the prisons and killed the guards. After some fighting the two leaders, named Cara Saïm and Cara Mustafa, were killed, and their bodies were left exposed on pikes at the entrance of the Grand Harbour on a strip of land which subsequently became known as Punta delle Forche (Gallows Point); this was the same location where the Orsi Tower and later Fort Ricasoli would be built in the 17th century.

This revolt is only known from the writings of 17th-century historian Giacomo Bosio, and his account's authenticity has been disputed. The event is not mentioned in the Order's archives, but the Order is known to have decided upon the construction of a slave prison in 1531. The memory of the event may have remained with the slaves as they were particularly surveilled on the day of the anniversary of the revolt.

==== Revolt of 1596 ====
The second known revolt happened in February 1596, when several slaves suddenly refused to go back to their prisons in Valletta and Birgu and escaped after managing to seize a set of keys to the gates of Valletta, leaving the gates open after escaping. They reached the Maltese countryside, where they roamed for some days in search of a ship to flee the island while trying to rally other slaves they met along the way. The escapees were eventually caught and condemned.

This incident troubled the Order. It not only revealed the lack of security in the prisons, but the opening of the city gates at night was a serious security breach. This episode demonstrated Malta's vulnerability to an organised Ottoman attack, which had remained a concern since the failed Ottoman siege of 1565. Following this attempted revolt, the growing number of slaves on Malta was perceived as a security risk. These slaves were seen as a fifth column who might support future Muslim attacks from within.

After the incident, Grand Master Martín Garzés ordered the increased surveillance of prisons. From 1602 onwards, his successor Alof de Wignacourt promoted new regulations regarding the management of slaves in Malta. From this point onwards, slaves could not engage in paid activity or engage in trade, except for small sums under the direct surveillance of the Order. Slaves were no longer allowed to rent lodgings. With minor revisions, these regulations remained in place throughout the 17th century.

The 1596 revolt had been largely forgotten until mention of it was rediscovered in archives.

==== Revolt of 1749 ====
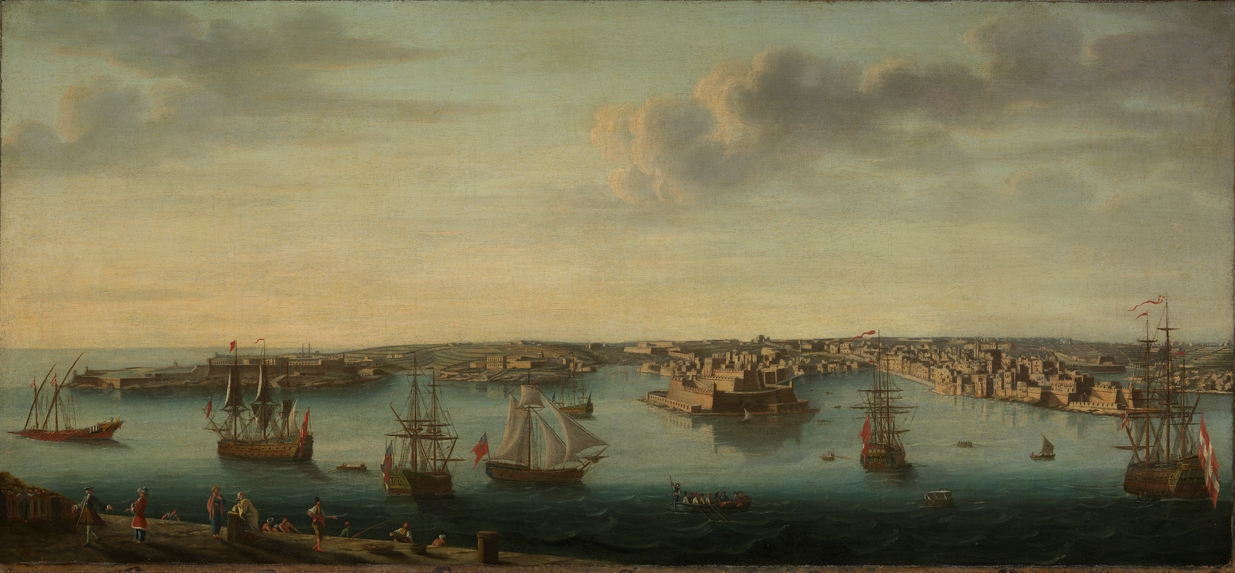
Malta's Grand Harbour as depicted in a c. 1750 painting

In 1749, Muslim slaves plotted a major rebellion in an attempt to overthrow the Hospitallers from the island. The plot was planned by Mustafa, Pasha of Rhodes, who had been brought to Malta as a captive in 1748 following a rebellion by Christian slaves on his own ship Lupa. Mustafa was freed in May 1749, but he secretly plotted a rebellion with other slaves.

The plot was planned to be carried out on 29 June 1749, a Catholic feast day. Slaves planned to assassinate several Hospitaller knights including the Grand Master Manuel Pinto da Fonseca, free other slaves from the Slaves' Prison in Valletta, arm themselves from the armouries, and capture Fort Saint Elmo.

The plot was discovered a few weeks before it could be carried out, and the Hospitaller response was brutal: many slaves were forced to reveal details of the plot under torture, 35 were executed, 3 died in custody and 72 were condemned to the galleys (8 of whom were branded with the letter R (ribelli) on their foreheads). Mustafa was not executed but was allowed to return to the Ottoman Empire with French assistance due to the Franco-Ottoman alliance.

== Abolition ==
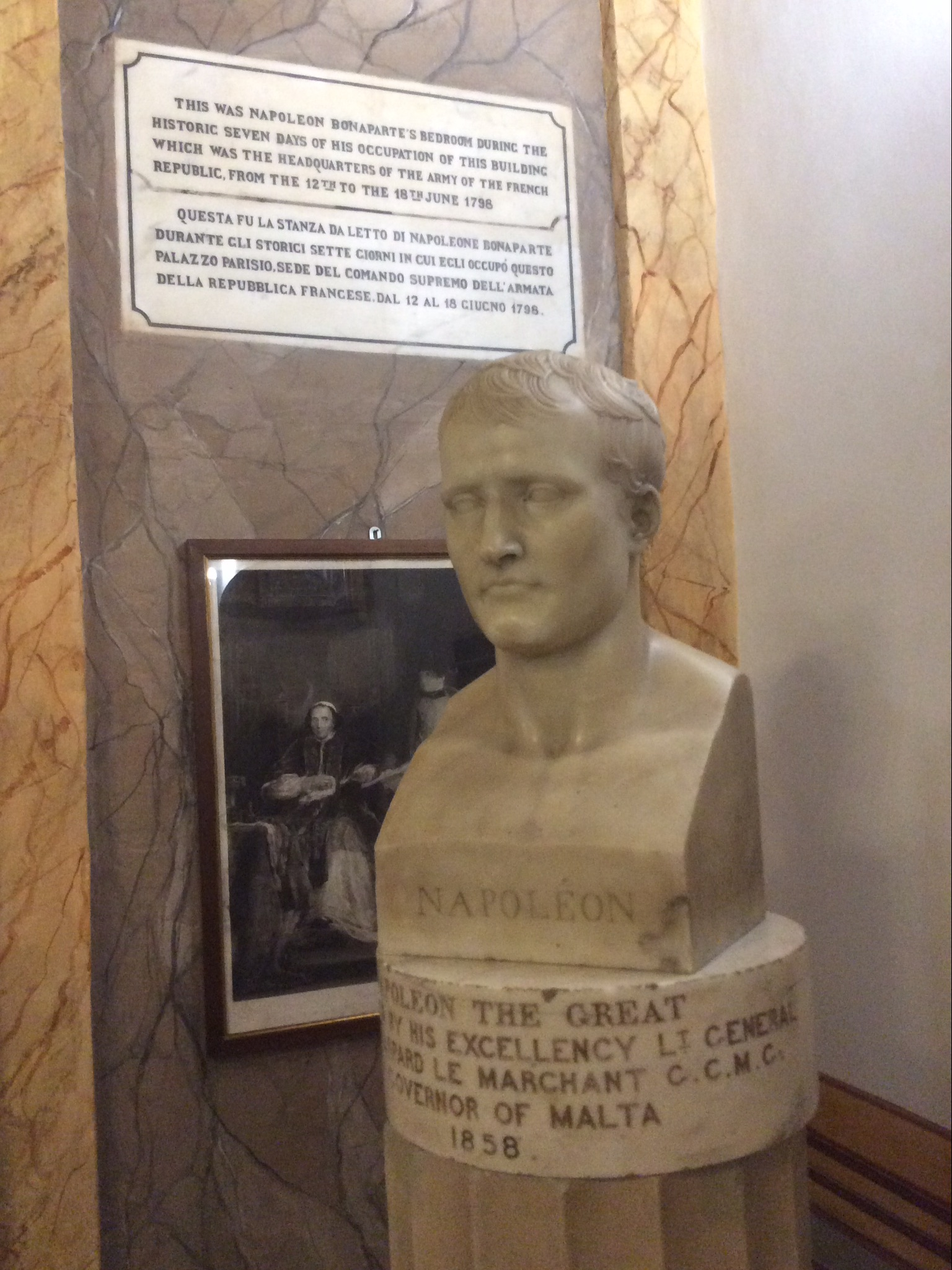
19th-century bust of Napoleon at Palazzo Parisio, Valletta, where he was staying at the time when he issued the decree abolishing slavery in Malta

In June 1798, Hospitaller Malta was invaded by forces of the French First Republic led by Napoleon, and the Order surrendered the islands after token resistance. Four years earlier, the French government had abolished slavery in its colonies. On 16 June 1798, a few days into the French occupation of Malta, Napoleon formally abolished slavery on the Maltese Islands with a decree which translates to:

Article 3. Slavery is abolished: all slaves known as bonnivagli will be set free, and the contract dishonourable to the human species that they have made is destroyed.
Article 4. In consequence of the preceding article, all Turks who are slaves of any private individual shall be delivered into the hands of the commanding general, to be treated as prisoners of war; and, in view of the friendship which exists between the French Republic and the Ottoman Porte, they shall be sent home when the general-in-chief so orders, and when he has knowledge that the beys consent to send back to Malta all the French or Maltese slaves which they may have.

The decree freed both government-owned and privately owned slaves, and the former slave owners did not receive any compensation for their losses.

In letters to French consuls in Tunis, Tripoli and Algiers, Napoleon claimed that over 2,000 slaves had been freed from Malta. 520 Muslim former slaves left Malta on French vessels on 17 June and were taken to Alexandria while Napoleon started his Egyptian campaign. 77 others, mostly Tunisians, left Malta in August and September 1798. Records indicate that the Christian slaves in Malta at the time only numbered to around 87 individuals, so the figure of 2,000 quoted by Napoleon is believed to have also included convicts and buonavoglia and not just slaves.

After the Maltese had revolted against the French occupation, the rebel National Congress discussed the issue of slavery during a sitting on 12 May 1800, after former slave owners had petitioned British Civil Commissioner Alexander Ball and sought permission to regain possession of their slaves. The Congress decided to uphold the personal freedoms of the former slaves, and Ball issued a proclamation to this effect on 15 May.

It is worth noting that Napoleon reintroduced slavery in the French colonies in 1802, but this had no effect on Malta as by that time France had lost the islands to the British. France did not fully abolish slavery until 1848.

=== Persistence of slavery after de jure abolition ===
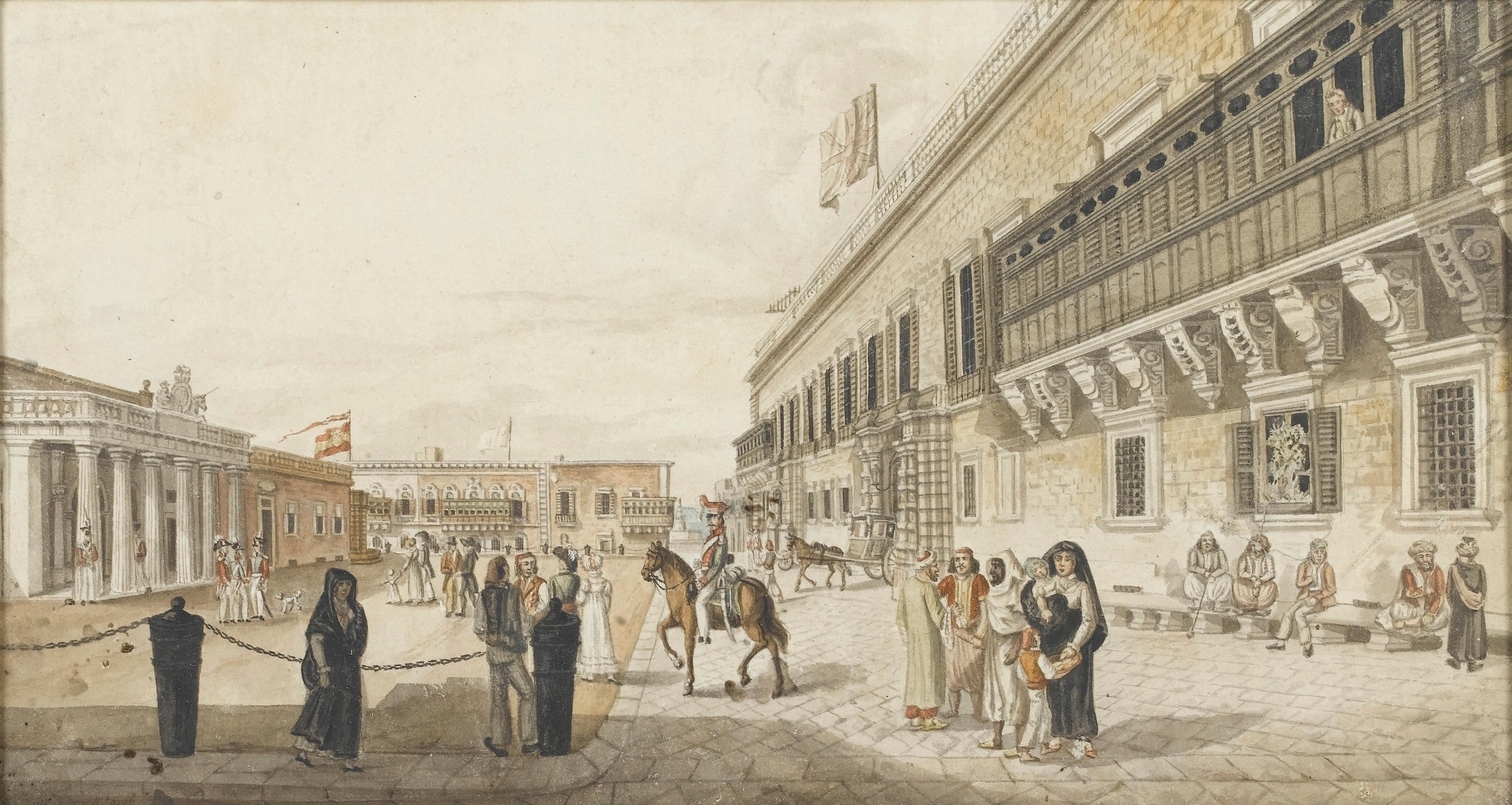
Valletta's Piazza San Giorgio during the early years of British rule, as painted by Charles Frederick de Brocktorff, c. 1820

In practice, some privately owned slaves continued to serve their former masters long after the de jure abolition of slavery in Malta. Many had been treated well by their masters and might have been unwilling to leave or had nowhere else to go. After Malta formally became a British colony in 1813, de facto slavery was still practiced, with a notarial deed by a certain Michelina Briffa making reference to "her two slaves" Paolo and Tomasa being dated as late as 11 March 1814.

During the early years of British rule, black Africans, including children, are known to have been imported to Malta from North African ports such as Alexandria, Tripoli, Djerba and Tunis. While they were not generally referred to as slaves in quarantine registers, they were allegedly sold as servants to the Maltese and to British subjects, as claimed in an 1812 letter sent by a man named G. Macintosh to abolitionist Zachary Macaulay of the African Institution. On 30 September 1812, a government proclamation was issued prohibiting these imports and declaring that "negroes cannot be considered as objects of trade." In a December 1812 letter, Civil Commissioner Hildebrand Oakes wrote that there were no more than 100 to 150 "negro servants" in the Maltese Islands, and acknowledged that some of them might have been purchased as slaves in Alexandria but clarified that they were not to be treated as slaves in Malta.

Some Maltese people are said to have continued their involvement in slave trading in Africa until the mid-19th century. These include the explorer Andrea Debono and his nephew Annibale, who were accused of trading slaves in southern Sudan in the 1860s.

== Maltese people enslaved abroad ==
When Malta was part of the Kingdom of Sicily and during Hospitaller rule, the islands were subjected to occasional razzias and attacks by Arabs from North Africa, and later by Barbary corsairs and the Ottoman Empire. Many Maltese were enslaved during such raids, and sparsely populated parts of the archipelago, including the island of Gozo, were particularly vulnerable. Other Maltese were enslaved while they were on board ships captured by Muslims.

Records indicate that Gozo was being raided as early as 1410. In 1423–1424, Malta was raided by Arabs and the island's bishop was among those taken into captivity. Between September and October 1429, Malta was invaded by the Hafsids, and although the attackers were unable to take the fortified city of Mdina, the nearby suburb of Rabat was destroyed. Between 3,000 and 4,500 Maltese were captured and enslaved by the invaders: a sizeable percentage of the island's total population at the time, which might have been as low as 10,000. In 1510, 170 Christian slaves were liberated from Tripoli when the city was captured by Spain; the majority of these were Sicilians and Maltese.

The Barbary corsairs and Ottomans occasionally raided the Maltese Islands throughout the 16th and 17th centuries. Some 400 people were enslaved during a raid on Mosta in 1526. The frequency of raids increased after the Hospitallers established themselves on Malta in 1530, with Gozo being raided in 1533, 1540, 1541, 1544, 1545, 1546, 1547 and 1550. During the 1540 raid 50 Gozitans were enslaved by corsairs led by Dragut.

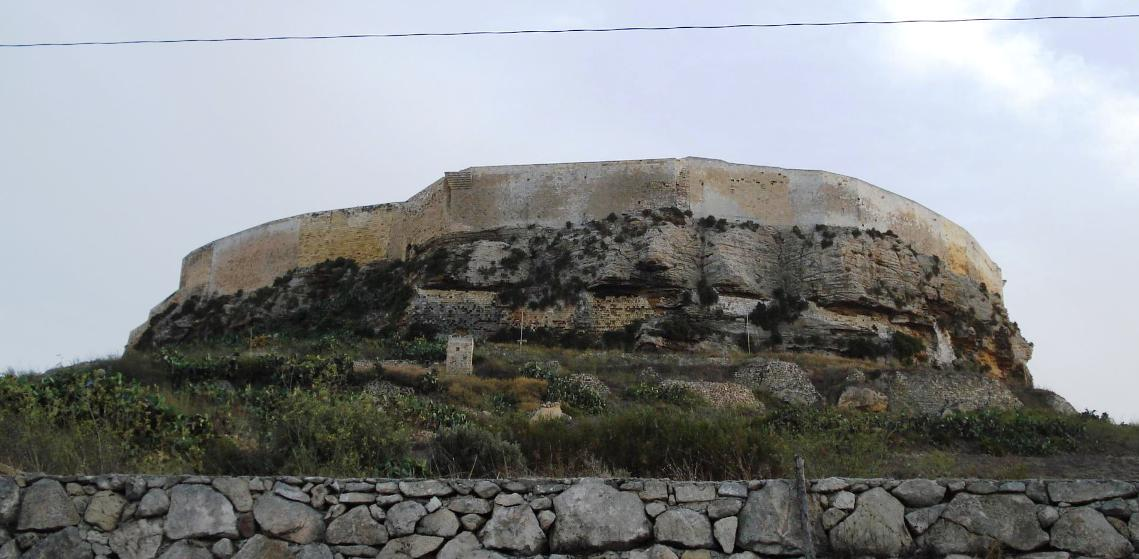
The medieval northern walls of the Castello, which was sacked by the Ottomans in 1551

In July 1551, the majority of Gozo's population—some 5,000 to 7,000 people—were enslaved when the island's Castello surrendered following an Ottoman attack. The only inhabitants who avoided being enslaved were a few hundred people who managed to escape by scaling down the Castello's walls, along with 40 elderly men, a pregnant woman and a monk who were spared by the Ottomans. The slaves were taken to North Africa and some were sold there while the majority were later taken to Constantinople. Records indicate that some were eventually freed or ransomed, some converted to Islam and others died in slavery. The majority never returned to the Maltese Islands, and Gozo remained depopulated until it was gradually resettled by Maltese and Sicilians in subsequent decades.

In August 1551, less than one month after the sack of Gozo, the same Ottoman force captured Tripoli from the Hospitallers; the knights negotiated safe passage to Malta for themselves upon the surrender of the city, but the Maltese and Rhodian soldiers and Calabrian mercenaries who had garrisoned the city were captured and remained in North Africa as slaves.

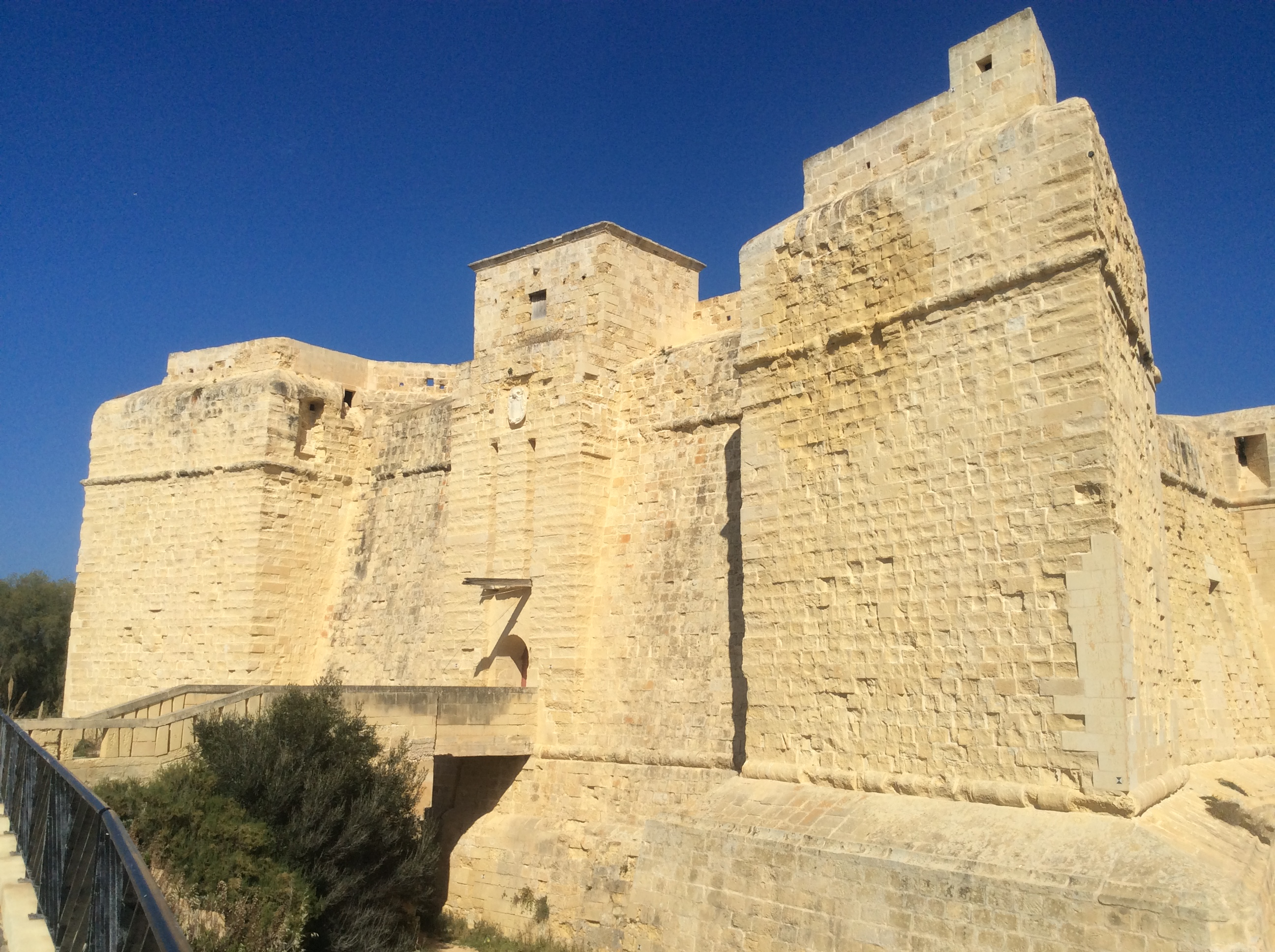
Coastal fortifications such as Saint Thomas Tower were built to defend Malta's coastline against raids by Ottomans or Barbary corsairs

There are records of other raids on Gozo occurring in 1560, 1563, 1572, 1574, 1583, 1598 and 1599; during the 18 October 1583 raid, 70 people were taken from the island's main town of Rabat by corsairs from Bizerte. (Note: Some sources claim this raid occurred in 1582, but archival sources at the National Library of Malta state that it occurred on 18 October 1583.) The last major attack was a raid on southern Malta in July 1614, when an Ottoman fleet landed at Marsaskala Bay and proceeded to pillage the area around Żejtun before being repelled by a Maltese and Hospitaller militia. There appear to have been casualties on both sides, and although Christian sources specifically state that "no one of the Christians was captured", Turkish sources reportedly mention that some Maltese were enslaved during this raid. Some 50 Ottomans were reportedly also captured by the Hospitallers during the 1614 raid and were themselves enslaved.

In response to these raids, the Hospitallers built a series of fortifications around Malta and Gozo in the 17th and 18th centuries to help defend the islands' coastline. The frequency of raids decreased significantly by the mid-17th century, but the threat continued until the 18th century. Smaller-scale raids still occurred, such as when two corsair ships from Sfax captured a family of 8 people after landing at Ramla Bay on 7 July 1733. In this case, funds were raised to ransom the family and they returned to Gozo two years later.

In general, the number of Maltese enslaved by Muslims appears to have been relatively low when compared to slaves from other nationalities. Records of the Monte della Redenzione degli Schiavi indicate that only 84 Maltese slaves sent in pleas to be redeemed in 1717, while 106 did so in 1722. The conditions of Christian slaves held by Muslims appear to have been similar to those of Muslim slaves held by Christians: slaves were sometimes allowed to work and earn money, and they could obtain freedom through redemption, escape or manumission. When a Muslim ship was captured by Christians, the Christian slaves on board were generally liberated. An example of this can be seen in the case of Dionysius Fiteni, who was liberated in 1732 after 20 years of slavery when the galley he was working on was attacked and captured by a Hospitaller vessel commanded by Jacques-François de Chambray. Conversion to Islam was also a regular occurrence among Maltese enslaved abroad, although those who converted and subsequently managed to make their way back home would face the Inquisition tribunal upon their return to Malta.

Many of the Maltese who were still enslaved in North Africa or the Ottoman Empire at the end of the 18th century were freed shortly after the 1798 abolition of slavery in Malta. 66 Maltese slaves were freed from Tunisia in 1798, 250 were freed from Algeria in 1801, and 200 were freed from Constantinople in 1802. After the Maltese revolted against the French in September 1798, most of the former slaves who returned to Malta from North Africa joined the ranks of the insurgents and fought against the French.

== Legacy and historiogrpahy ==
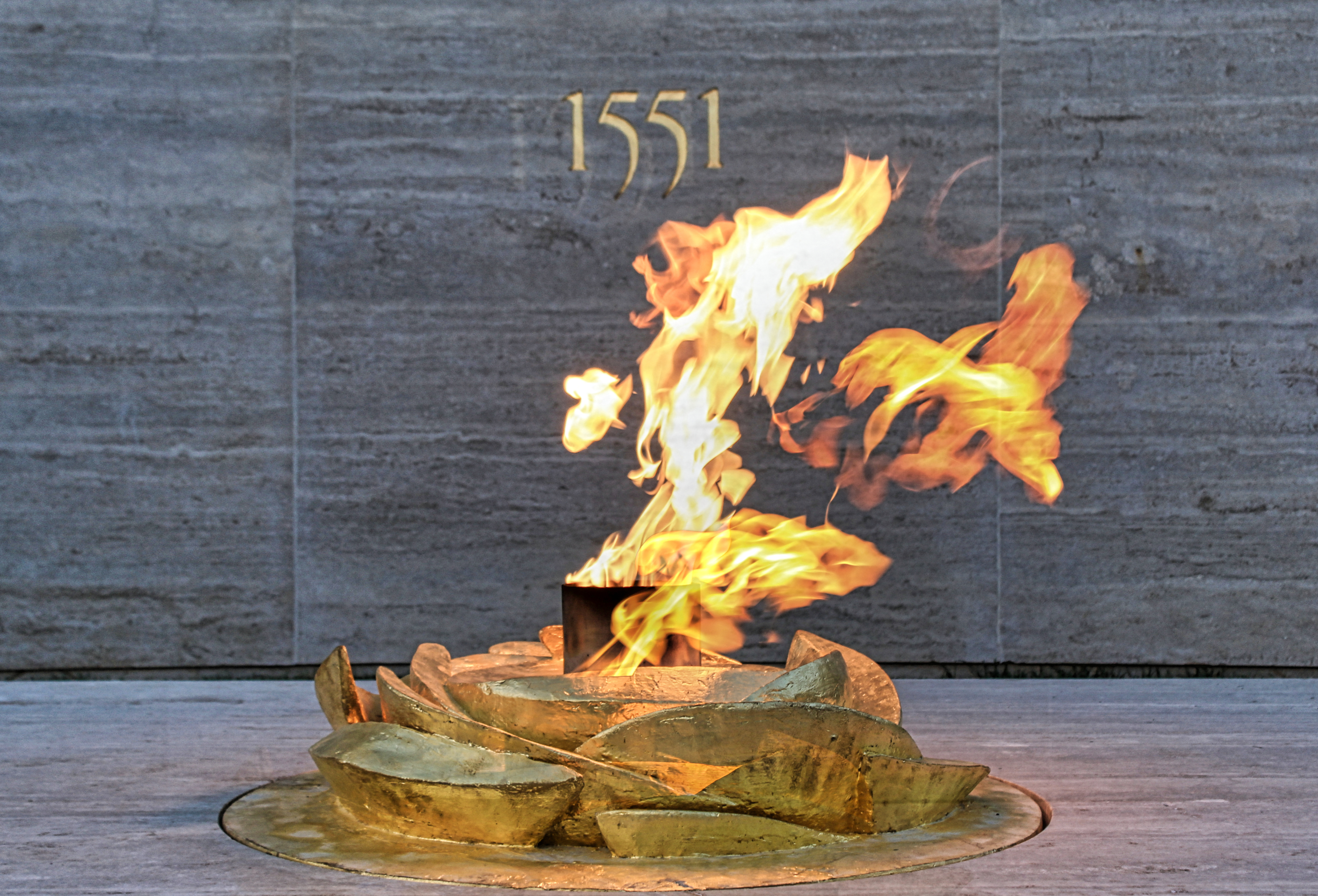
Memorial outside the Cittadella commemorating the 1551 attack on Gozo

Primary sources which shed a light on slavery during the period of Hospitaller rule include the Archives of the Order of Malta which are held at the National Library of Malta, the archives of the inquisition, and the Notarial Archives. Some individuals who had been captured by the Hospitaller fleet and were enslaved on Malta later wrote autobiographical accounts, including Ottoman qadi Macuncuzade Mustafa Efendi (enslaved in 1597 and ransomed in 1600), and Moroccan prince Muhammad el-Attaz (enslaved in 1651 and ransomed in 1656, later known as Baldassare Diego Loyola after converting to Christianity). The slave revolt plot of 1749 is particularly well-documented in a wide variety of unpublished and published sources.

The enslavement of Maltese by Barbary corsairs and the presence of Muslim slaves in Malta feature in a number of Maltese folk tales such as those of Għar Ħasan and the bride of Mosta; some versions of these stories involve the abduction and enslavement of Maltese women by Muslim men who had themselves been slaves in Malta. The Church of Our Lady of Hope in Mosta and the Chapel of Saint Demetrius in Għarb are associated with legends of individuals who are said to have survived slave raids by Barbary pirates through divine intervention. Some descendants of the Gozitans who had been enslaved in Libya in 1551 reportedly maintained a memory of their Maltese ancestry until the 20th century.

No commemorations or monuments were held for the bicentenary of the abolition of slavery in 1998. Public monuments commemorating the Gozitans enslaved in 1551 were installed in the 2010s.

== See also ==
- Catholic Church and slavery
- Islam in Malta
- Human trafficking in Malta
