= Macuncuzade Mustafa Efendi =

Macuncuzade Mustafa Efendi was an Ottoman qadi and poet who wrote a slave narrative about his captivity and enslavement in Hospitaller Malta between 1597 and 1600.

Macuncuzade was born in Constantinople in around the 1550s. He was appointed as qadi of Paphos in Ottoman Cyprus on 19 March 1597, and after being delayed for a month due to illness, he boarded a ship known as a karamürsel in order to make the journey to his new appointment from Galata on 22 April. He was accompanied on this journey by his slave. In May, they encountered the Hospitaller fleet consisting of four galleys when they were around 70 miles (110 km) off Cyprus, and they were attacked. 30 men from the Ottoman ship lost their lives in the ensuing skirmish. The captain, Alaiyeli Mehmed Reis, then surrendered the ship and its remaining crew and passengers – including Macuncuzade and his slave – were captured by the Hospitallers.

Macuncuzade wrote that they were taken on board a "Frenk ship captained by Sente Bin"; the latter is likely a reference to the French knight Fra Pierre de Rocquelaure de Saint-Aubin, who had previously commanded one of the Hospitaller galleys during the 1571 Battle of Lepanto. The Hospitaller galley squadron then spent another twenty days attacking other Muslim ships, and they captured another twelve ships and a total of 283 slaves before returning to their base in Malta. Upon their arrival, the captives were evaluated by a commission which set out a ransom amount according to each person's rank and status, and they were allowed to send letters to those who could pay their ransom in order to explain that they had been captured and to inform them of the amount required to secure their freedom.

High-ranking Ottoman officials were typically ransomed directly by the sultanate, and Macuncuzade petitioned the Valide sultan Safiye in this regard. His ransom of 500 gold florins was paid in late 1599, and it is possible that Macuncuzade's slave was released by the Hospitallers in exchange for a Christian slave. After securing his freedom, Macuncuzade left Malta in January 1600.

Shortly after his release, he wrote a narrative entitled Baz Kest-i Hakiri-i Malta Sergiizess-i Esiri-i Malta based on notes and poems he had composed while imprisoned. A manuscript copy of it was made by a scribe named Omer in 1602, and the latter is preserved at the Hacı Selim Ağa Library in Üsküdar. Its text was published and translated in the 20th and 21st centuries, and it is regarded as an important primary source about the activities of the Hospitaller fleet and of slavery in Malta during the late 16th century.

== See also ==
- List of slaves
