= West of Wied ix-Xaqqa to Wied Maqbul Cliffs Important Bird Area =

Conservation area in Malta

Coordinates: 35°48′N 14°31′E

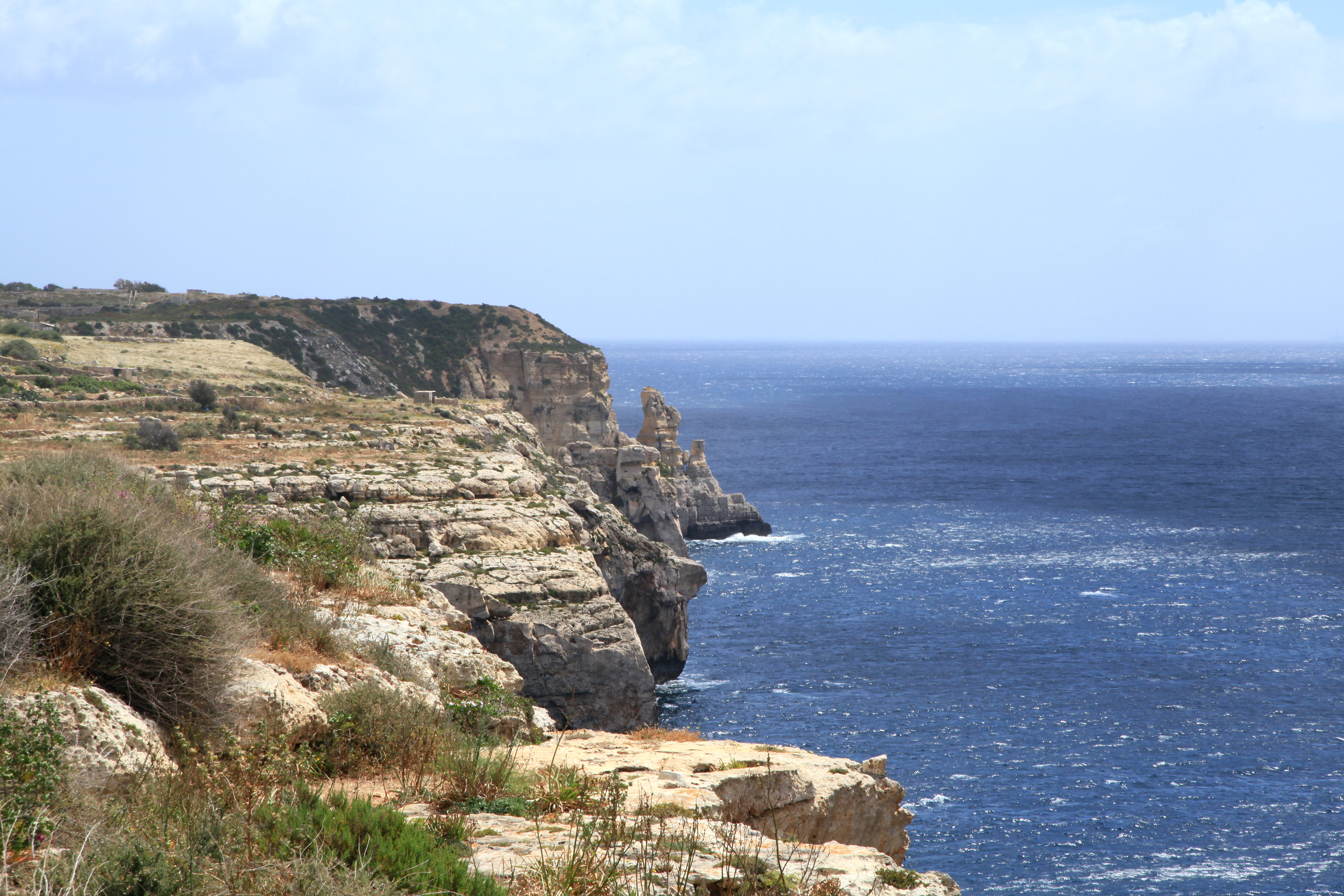
Cliffs in Birżebbuġa

The West of Wied ix-Xaqqa to Wied Maqbul Cliffs Important Bird Area comprises a 21 ha linear strip of cliffed coastline at Birżebbuġa, on the southeastern coast of Malta, in the Maltese archipelago of the Mediterranean Sea. Its steep and rugged cliffs rise from sea level to a height of over 50 m. It was identified as an Important Bird Area (IBA) by BirdLife International because it supports 1000–1500 breeding pairs of Cory's shearwaters and 100–150 pairs of yelkouan shearwaters.

== See also ==
- List of birds of Malta
