= Varakļāni Parish =

Parish in Madona Municipality, Latvia

- parish of Latvia
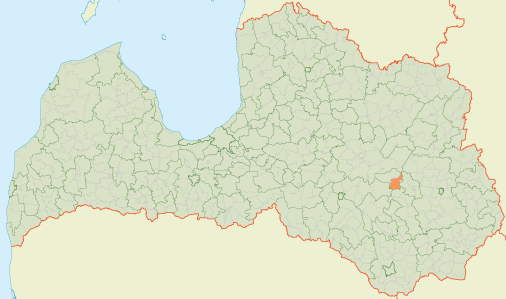
- Coordinates: 56°35′39″N 26°40′58″E
- Country: Latvia

Population (1 January 2026)
  - Total: 575
- Time zone: Eastern European Time

Varakļāni Parish (Latvian: Varakļānu pagasts) is an administrative unit of Madona Municipality, Latvia. Its center is Stirnienes muiža (also Stirniene Manor).

From 2009 to 2025, the parish was a part of Varakļāni Municipality.

== Villages and settlements of Varakļāni parish ==
- Kokari - former parish administrative center
- Stirniene
- Stirnienes muiža - current administrative center

== See also ==
- Varakļāni Palace
