= Grandmaster's Palace, Valletta =

Palace in Malta

Grandmaster's Palace
- Il-Palazz tal-Granmastru
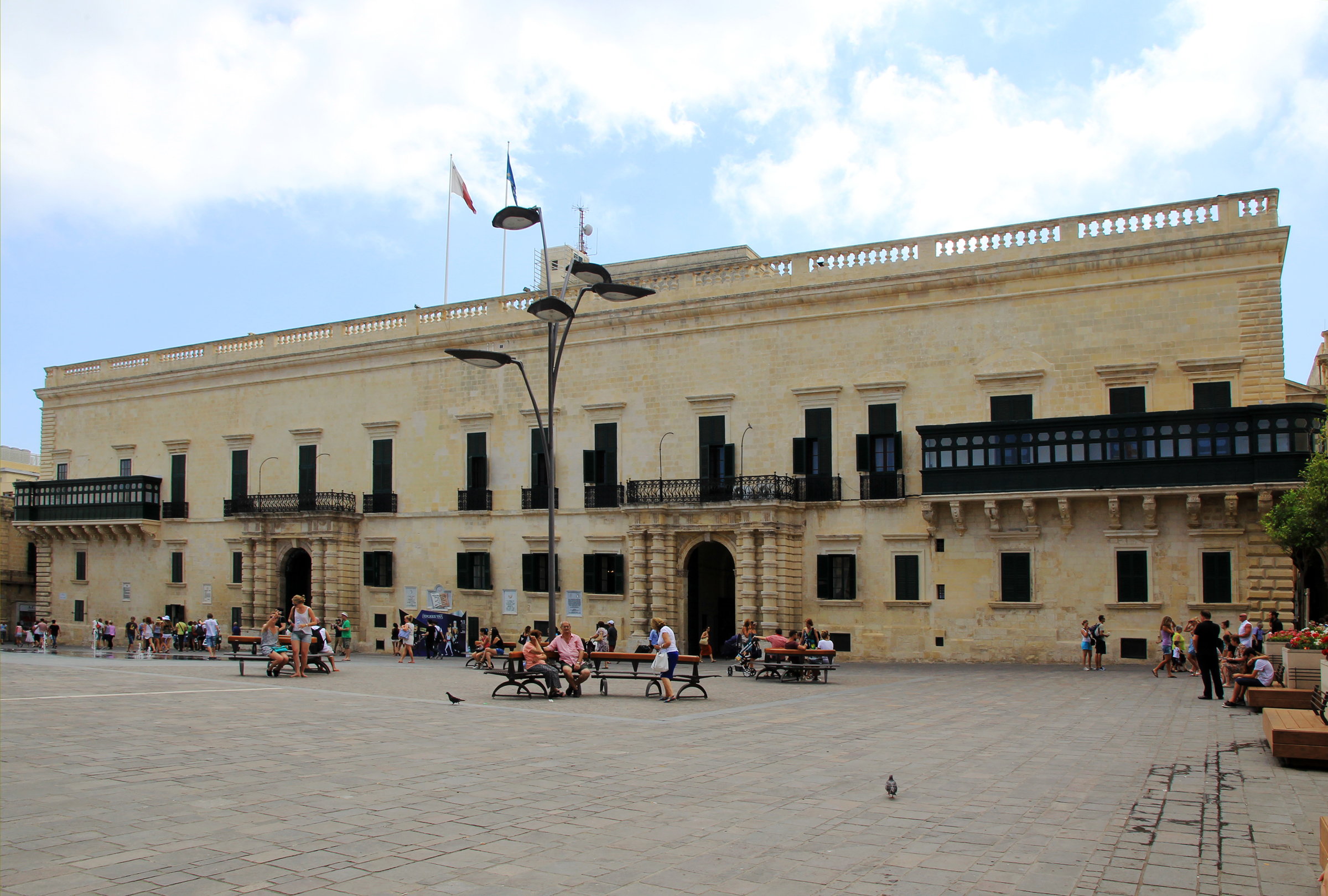
- Main façade of the Palace in St. George's Square
- Interactive map of the Grandmaster's Palace area
- Former names: Magisterial Palace; Governor's Palace
- Alternative names: The Palace

General information
- Status: Intact
- Type: Palace
- Architectural style: Mannerist and Baroque
- Location: Valletta, Malta
- Coordinates: 35°53′55″N 14°30′51″E
- Current tenants: Office of the President of Malta; Heritage Malta
- Construction started: 1574 (Note: Incorporating parts of a house built in 1569 and an auberge built in c. 1571.)
- Renovated: 1740s
- Owner: Government of Malta

Technical details
- Material: Limestone
- Floor count: 2

Design and construction
- Architect: Girolamo Cassar

The Grandmaster's Palace (Maltese: Il-Palazz tal-Granmastru), officially known as The Palace (Maltese: Il-Palazz), is a palace in Valletta, Malta. It was built between the 16th and 18th centuries as the palace of the Grand Master of the Knights Hospitaller, who ruled Malta from 1530 to 1798, and was also known as the Magisterial Palace (Maltese: Palazz Maġisterjali). When the knights were expelled by Napoleonic France, it became the National Palace. During the period of British rule beginning in 1800, it was the Governor's Palace (Maltese: Palazz tal-Gvernatur).

The palace became a British royal residence with various governors representing the monarchy and the queen, and with the royal family itself. As an official royal residence it was often used by British sovereigns for major events during their stay in Malta.

The Palace currently houses the Office of the President of Malta. It was also the seat of the Parliament of Malta from 1921 to 2015. Parts of the building, namely the Palace State Rooms and the Palace Armoury are open to the public as a museum run by Heritage Malta. The building underwent a major restoration project and was reopened to the public in 2024.

== Location ==
The Grandmaster's Palace occupies a city block in the centre of Valletta, and it is the largest palace in the city. Its façade is located opposite the Main Guard in St. George's Square (Maltese: Misraħ San Ġorġ) along Republic Street (Maltese: Triq ir-Repubblika). The palace is also bounded by Archbishop Street (Maltese: Triq l-Arċisqof), Old Theatre Street (Maltese: Triq it-Teatru l-Antik) and Merchants Street (Maltese: Triq il-Merkanti).

== History ==
=== Hospitaller rule ===
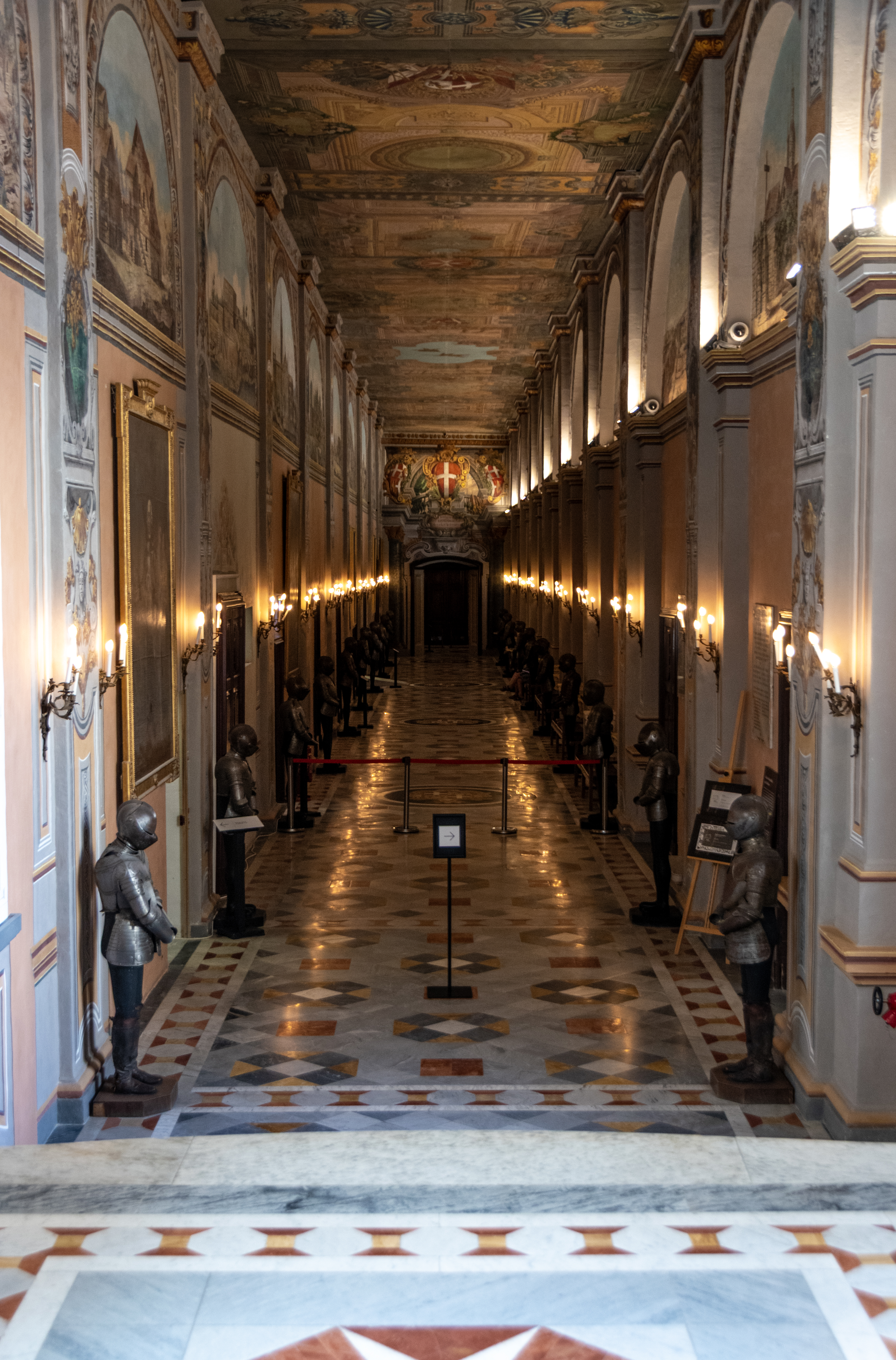
Corridor in the Grandmaster's Palace

When the Order of St. John established the new city of Valletta in 1566, the original intention was to build the palace of the Grand Master on high ground in the southern part of the city (on or near the site later occupied by Auberge de Castille). In fact, present-day South Street (Maltese: Triq in-Nofsinhar) was originally known as Strada del Palazzo, since the palace was meant to be built there.

The site of the palace was originally occupied by several buildings, including the house of the knight Eustachio del Monte which was built in 1569, and the auberge of the langue of Italy which was built in around 1571. Both of these buildings were built to designs of the Maltese architect Girolamo Cassar.

In 1571, Grand Master Pierre de Monte moved the Order's headquarters to Valletta, and he lived in the house of Eustachio del Monte, who was his nephew. The Council of the Order subsequently purchased the house, and in 1574 it began to be enlarged into a palace for the Grand Master. By this time, del Monte had died and he was succeeded as Grand Master by Jean de la Cassière. The Italian langue moved to a new auberge in 1579, and the original auberge was also incorporated into the palace. The Grandmaster's Palace was built to Mannerist designs of Glormo Cassar.

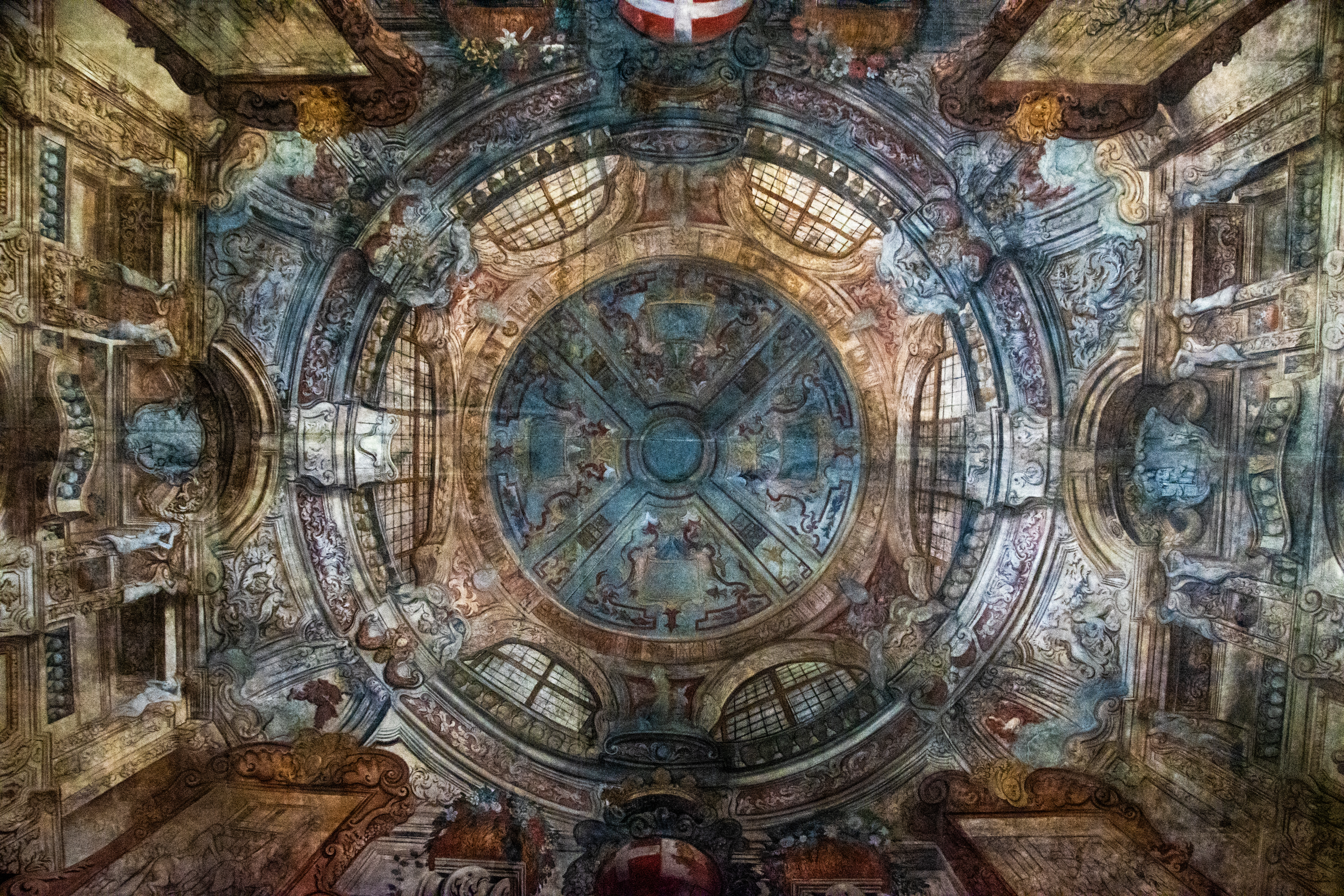
Trompe-l'œil Fresco by Nicolau Nasoni

The palace was modified and embellished by subsequent Grand Masters, which gave the building a Baroque character. The ceilings of the main corridors were decorated with frescoes by Nicolau Nasoni in 1724, during the magistracy of António Manoel de Vilhena. In the 1740s, Grand Master Manuel Pinto da Fonseca made extensive alterations to the building and gave it its present configuration. Pinto's renovations included the embellishment of the façade, the opening of a second main entrance, and the construction of a clock tower in one of the courtyards.

In the 1770s, the traveller Patrick Brydone wrote that:

the Grand Master (who studies conveniency more than magnificence) is more comfortably and commodiously, lodged than any prince in Europe, the King of Sardenia perhaps only excepted

=== French occupation ===
During the French occupation of Malta, the building became known as the Palais National (National Palace). The name was a reflection of the French ideas resulting from the revolution and part of the whole reformed establishment in Malta.

=== British rule and independent Malta ===
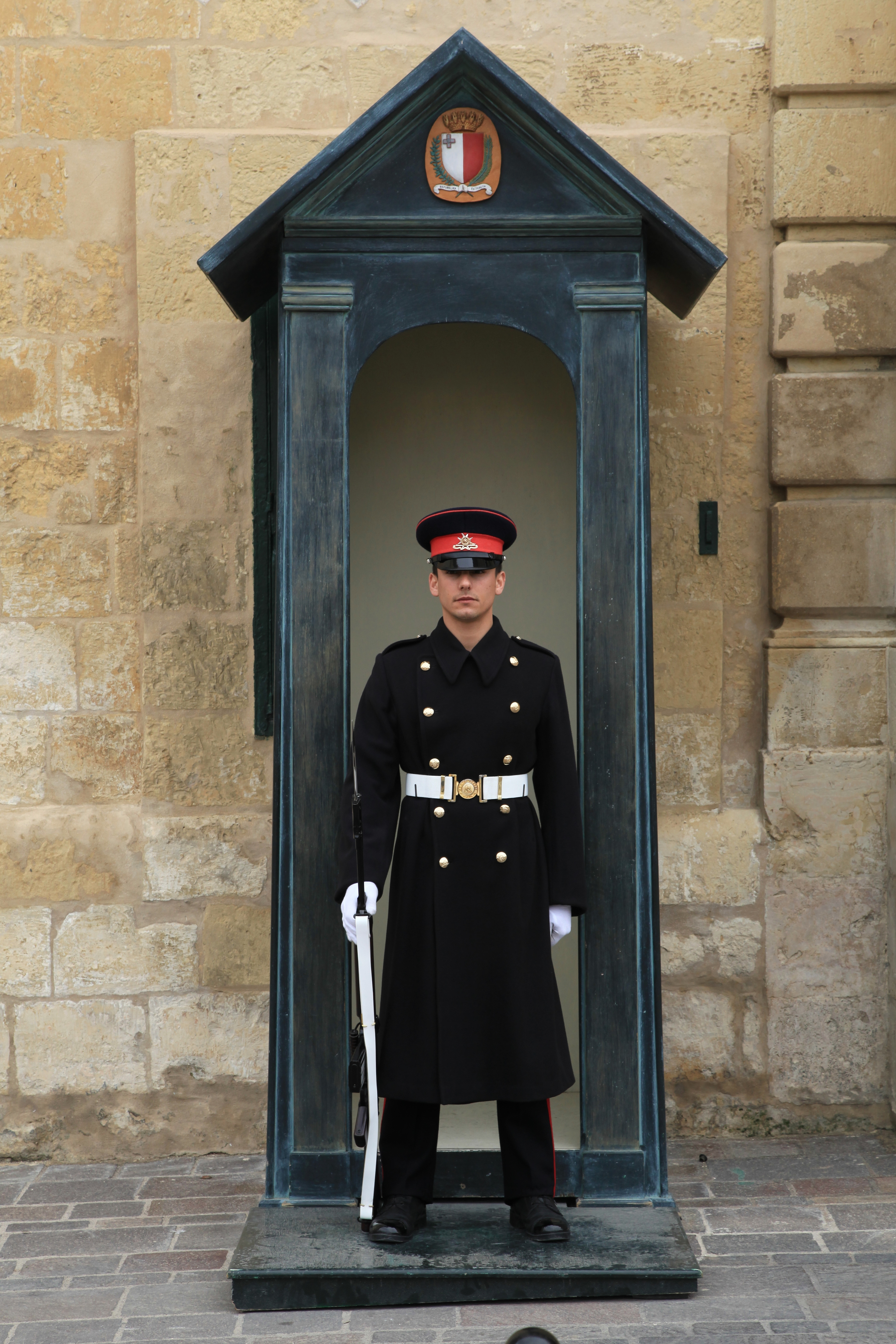
AFM guard at the palace

The Grandmaster's Palace became the official residence of the governor of Malta after Malta fell under British rule in 1800, and it therefore became known as the Governor's Palace. During the British protectorate, the kitchen of the palace which served the Grand Master was converted into an Anglican chapel. A semaphore station was installed on the palace's belvedere in the 1840s. Parts of the building, including the hall housing the Palace Armoury, were hit by aerial bombardment during World War II, but the damage was subsequently repaired.

The Grandmaster's Palace was the seat of the Parliament of Malta from 1921 to 2015. Parliament met in the Tapestry Hall from 1921 to 1976, when it moved to the former armoury. The House of Representatives moved out of the Grandmaster's Palace to the purpose-built Parliament House on 4 May 2015. During Malta's first presidency of the European Union in 2017 the former parliamentary meeting hall was used to host the meetings of the Council of the European Union.

Following Malta's independence in 1964, the building became the seat of the Governor-General of Malta. It has housed the Office of the President of Malta since the office was established in 1974. Parts of the building, namely the Palace State Rooms and the Palace Armoury, are open to the public as a museum run by Heritage Malta.

The palace was included on the Antiquities List of 1925. It is now a Grade 1 national monument, and it is also listed on the National Inventory of the Cultural Property of the Maltese Islands.

== Architecture ==
=== Exterior ===
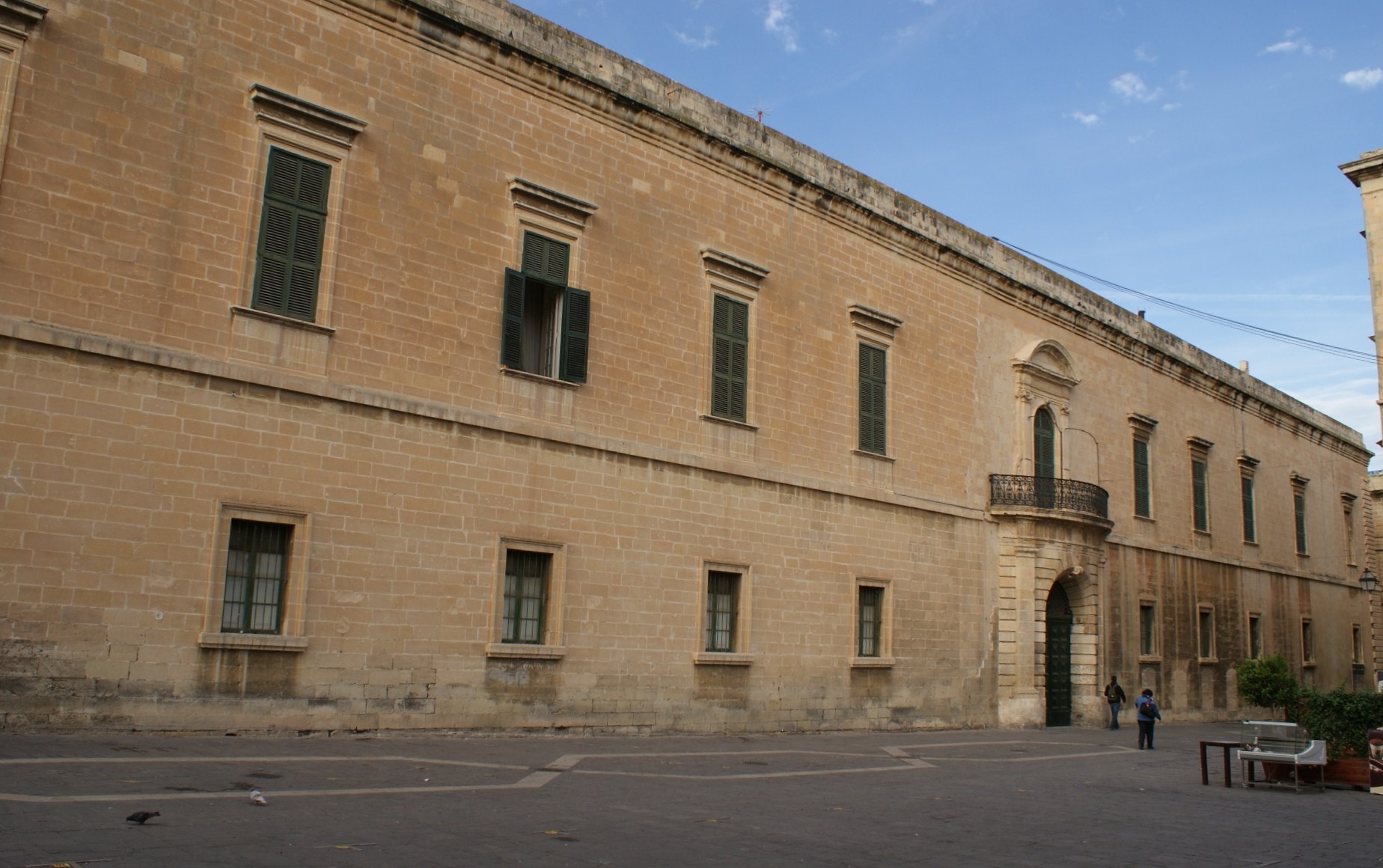
Rear façade on Merchants Street, with the armoury elaborated entrance designed by Romano Carapecchia in the 18th century.

The main façade of the Grandmaster's Palace is built in the simple and austere Mannerist style, typical of its architect Cassar. The façade is asymmetrical due to the extensive alterations carried out to the building over the centuries, and it has heavy rustications at the corners along with an uninterrupted cornice at roof level. There are two main entrances on the façade, and they each consist of an arched doorway surrounded by an ornate portal which supports an open balcony. Long closed timber balconies wrap around the corners of the main façade. Both the portals and the balconies were added to the building in the 18th century.

The side façade in Old Theatre Street contains a secondary main entrance which leads to one of the courtyards.

The building's exterior was originally painted in red ochre, a colour used by the Order to mark public buildings.

=== Interior ===
==== State Rooms ====
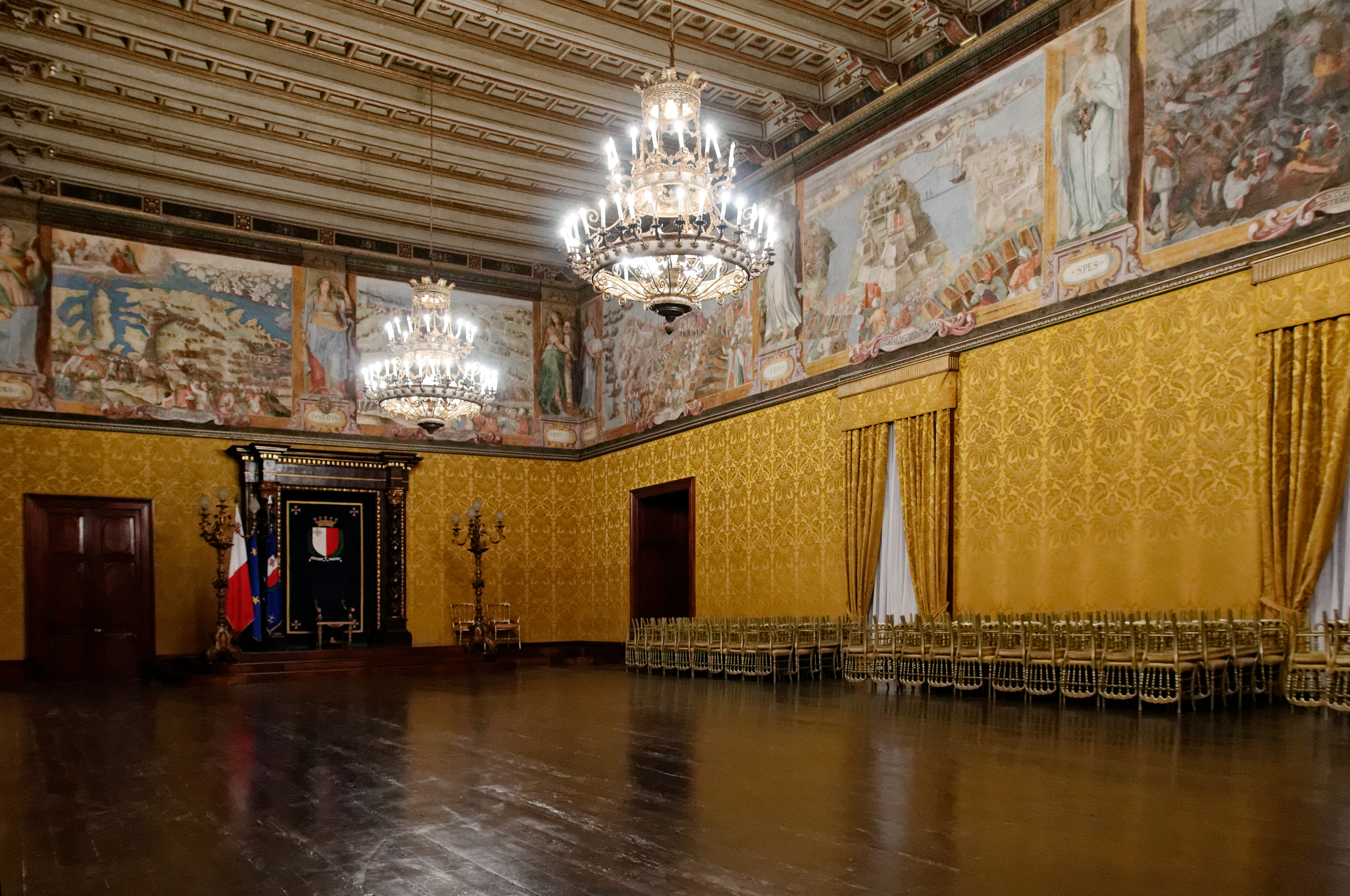
The Throne Room

The Throne Room (Maltese: Is-Sala tat-Tron), originally known as the Grand Council Hall (Maltese: Is-Sala tal-Gran Kunsill, Italian: Sala del Maggior Consiglio) was built during the reign of Grandmaster Jean de la Cassière. It was used by successive Grandmasters to host ambassadors and visiting high ranking dignitaries. During the British administration it became known as the Hall of Saint Michael and Saint George after the Order of St Michael and St George which was founded in 1818 in Malta and the Ionian Islands. It is currently used for state functions held by the President of Malta.

The cycle of wall paintings decorating the upper part of the hall are the work Matteo Perez d'Aleccio and represent various episodes of the Great Siege of Malta. The coat-of-arms of Grand Master Jean de Valette on the wall recess behind the minstrels gallery was painted by Giuseppe Calì.

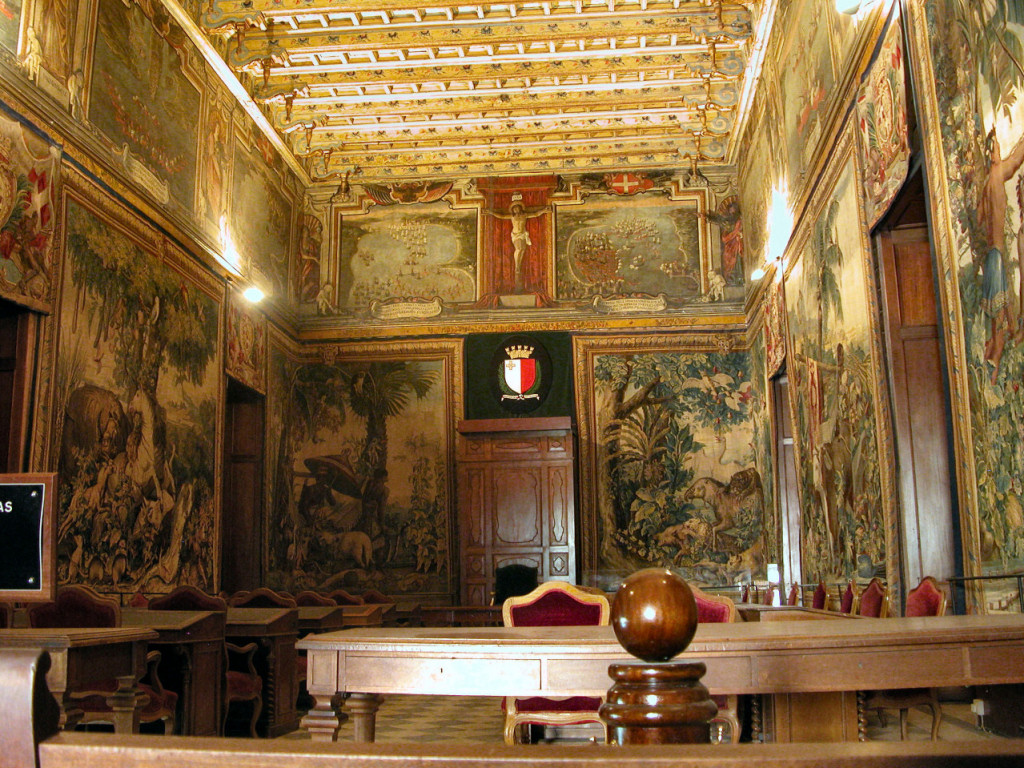
The Tapestry Hall

In 1818, the British transformed this hall by completely covering the walls with neo-classical architectural features designed by Lieutenant-Colonel George Whitmore. These were removed in the early 20th century. The minstrel's gallery is thought to have been relocated to this hall from the palace chapel which was probably its original location. Of particular interest is the original coffered ceiling and the late 18th century-style chandeliers.

The other state rooms are the Tapestry Hall (Maltese: Is-Sala tal-Arazzi), the State Dining Hall (Maltese: Is-Sala tal-Pranzu), the Ambassador's Room (Maltese: Is-Sala tal-Ambaxxaturi) and the Page's Waiting Room (Maltese: Is-Sala tal-Paġġi).

==== Armoury ====
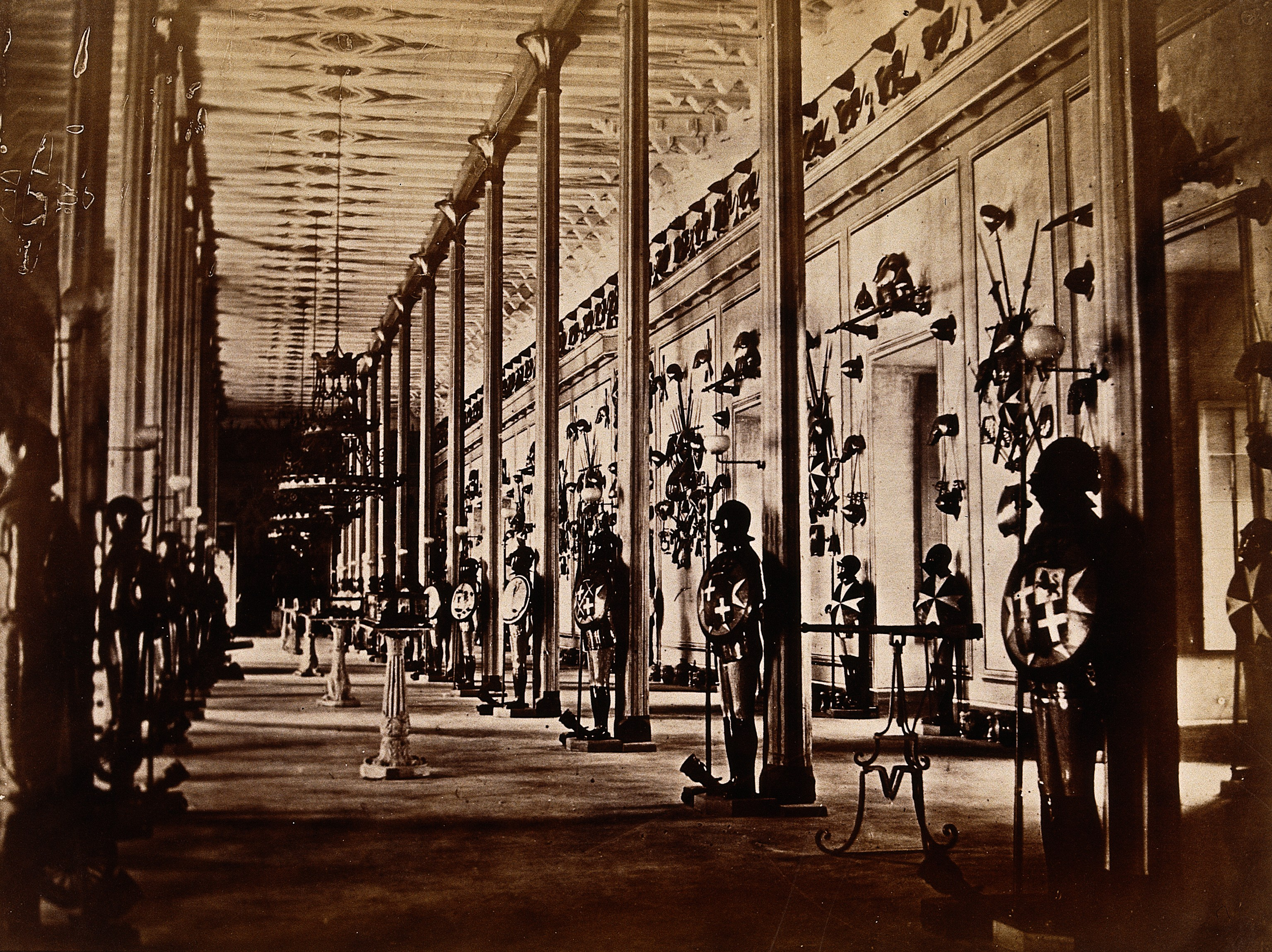
The original armoury hall in c. 1881

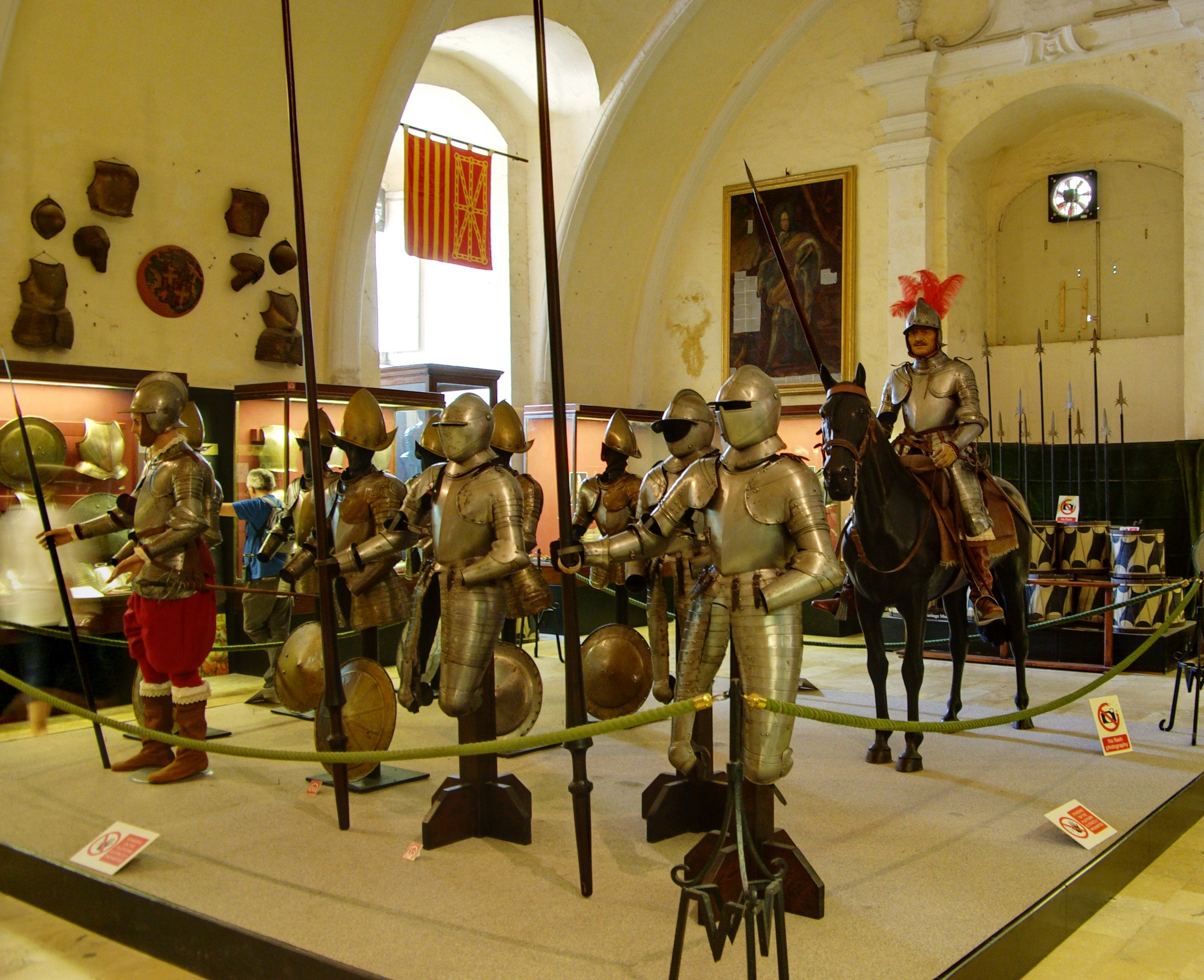
The armoury, housed in the former stables (now moved to old Parliament house)

A large hall at the rear of the palace was used as an armoury from 1604 onwards. The arms collection in the Palace Armoury is regarded as one of "the most valuable historic monuments of European culture", despite retaining only a fraction of its original size. The armoury includes many suits of armour, cannons, firearms, swords, and other weapons, including the personal armour of some Grand Masters such as Alof de Wignacourt, and Ottoman weapons captured during the Great Siege of Malta in 1565.

The original hall of the armoury was converted into the meeting place of the Parliament of Malta in 1975–76, and the arms collection was relocated to two former stables at the palace's ground floor, where it remains today. The armoury has been open to the public as a museum since 1860. Part of the restoration works currently underway include the relocation of the palace armoury back to its original location.

=== Courtyards ===
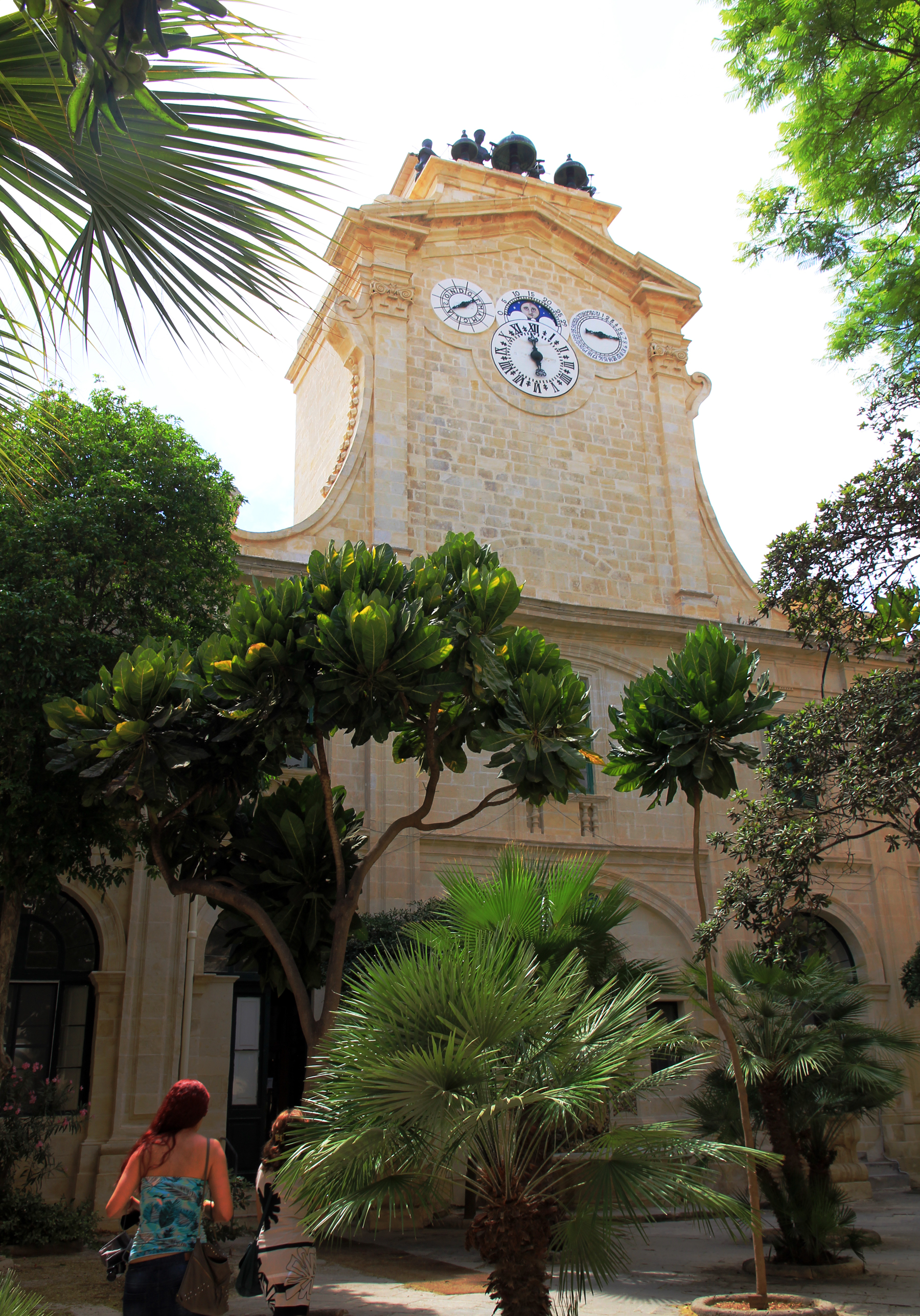
The clock tower in Prince Alfred's Courtyard

The palace is built around two courtyards, which are now known as Neptune's Courtyard and Prince Alfred's Courtyard.

In 1712 Romano Carapecchia designed the Perellos fountain, originally dominating the courtyard under the loggias, but since the British period became hidden from the main view with the Statue of Neptune and a garden landscape in the middle. The statue was brought to decorate the courtyard, on orders of the British Governor John Gaspard Le Marchant, some time between 1858 and 1864.

Some escutcheons containing the coats of arms of Grand Masters of the Order are found affixed to the wall of one of the corridors of Neptune's Courtyard. These formerly adorned some of the Order's buildings, but they were removed in the 19th century. They were retrieved by Governor Sir Arthur Lyon Fremantle in 1897, and were affixed to the courtyard "for their better preservation", as indicated by a marble slab below the coats of arms.

Hospitaller coats of arms relocated to Neptune's Courtyard in 1897

Prince Alfred's Courtyard contains a clock tower, which includes the Moors Clock as well as three other dials. The clock was designed by Gaetano Vella and it was inaugurated on 11 June 1745, being modified by Michelangelo Sapiano in 1894. Local tradition states that the clock is much older, having been brought from Rhodes at the time of the Order's arrival in Malta in 1530.

== Alleged haunting ==
The palace is allegedly haunted by a number of ghosts. According to an English lady who stayed at the palace while it was the residence of the British Governor, she used to hear sounds of cats and dogs fighting in one of the rooms, but she saw nothing once she entered the room. One time, the ghost manifested itself in the form of a large cat, which jumped through a window before vanishing. Another woman reportedly felt the presence of a ghost when sleeping at the palace.
