= Varakļāni Municipality =

Former municipality of Latvia

Coordinates: 56°36′N 26°45′E

Varakļāni Municipality Varakļānu novads
- Municipality
- Coat of arms

- Country: Latvia
- Municipalities: Madona
- Formed: 2009
- Dissolved: 2025
- Centre: Varakļāni

Government
  - Council Chair (last): Māris Justs (LA)

Area
  - Total: 277.95 km^{2} (107.32 sq mi)
  - Land: 272.09 km^{2} (105.05 sq mi)
  - Water: 5.86 km^{2} (2.26 sq mi)

Population (2024)
  - Total: 2,890
  - Density: 10.6/km^{2} (27.5/sq mi)
- Website: www.varaklani.lv

Varakļāni Municipality (Latvian: Varakļānu novads) was a municipality in Latgale, Latvia. The municipality was formed on 1 July 2009 by merging Varakļāni town, Murmastiene Parish and Varakļāni Parish of the former Madona district. The administrative centre was Varakļāni. It was merged into Madona Municipality on 1 July 2025.

Parts of Teiči Nature Reserve are located in the Municipality. The population in 2020 was 2,990.

== 2021–25 merger reforms ==
The 2021 Latvian administrative reform initially envisaged the incorporation of Varakļāni Municipality into Rēzekne Municipality. A significant opposition arose from local residents, parts of whom advocated for the preservance of the status quo, or coalesed around integration with Madona Municipality instead, and lead to protests. In June 2020, the municipal council filed a petition with the Constitutional Court of Latvia. On 28 May 2021, the Court adjudicated that the planned merger was unconstitutional. Despite it, on 31 May the Saeima voted to continue the amalgamation as planned. An intervention of the President of Latvia Egils Levits in an effort to avoid triggering a constitutional crisis lead to a delayment until 2025.

The 2021 Latvian municipal elections were thus held in Varakļāni and showcased a significant polarization away from Rēzekne politics. Subsequently, in June 2024, the Saeima ratified the dissolution of Varakļāni Municipality, rectifying the decision to incorporation with Madona Municipality instead. Varakļāni Municipality was officially dissolved on 1 July 2025, concurrently with the inaugural session of the newly reconstituted Madona Municipal Council.

== Gallery ==
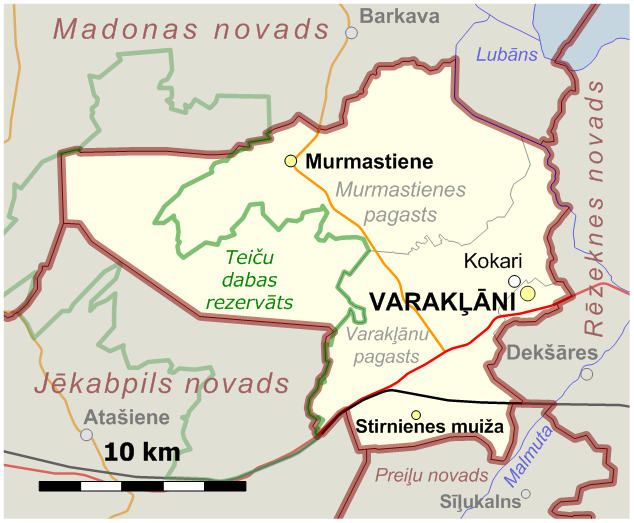
Map of the municipality, 2021

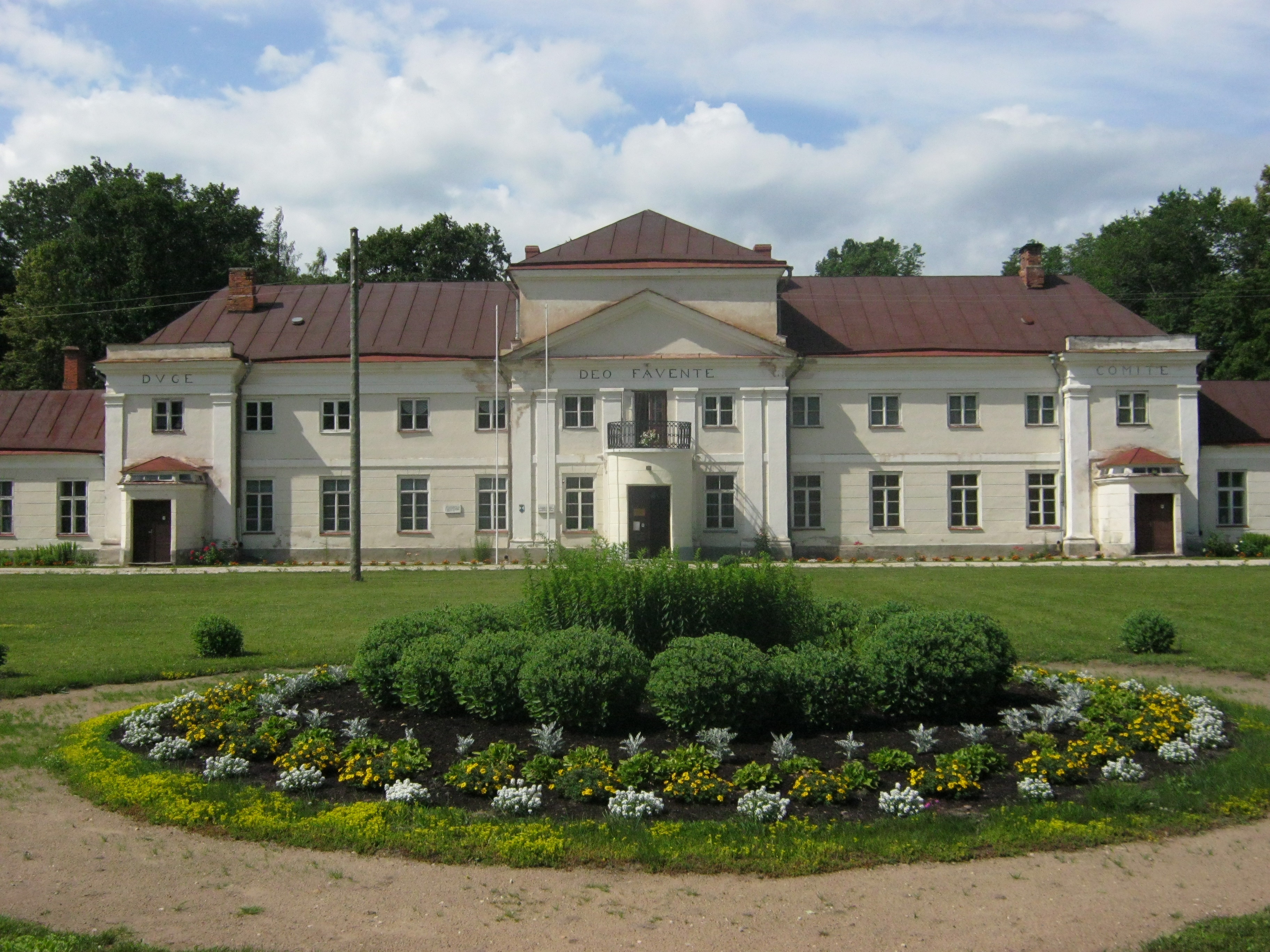
Varakļāni Palace

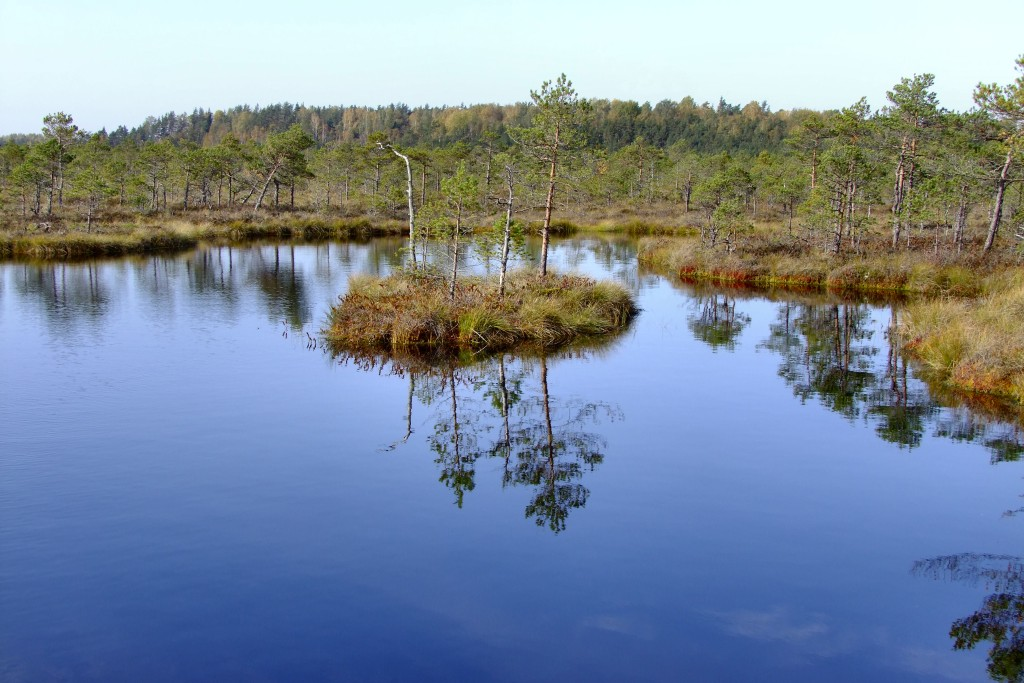
Teiči Nature Reserve

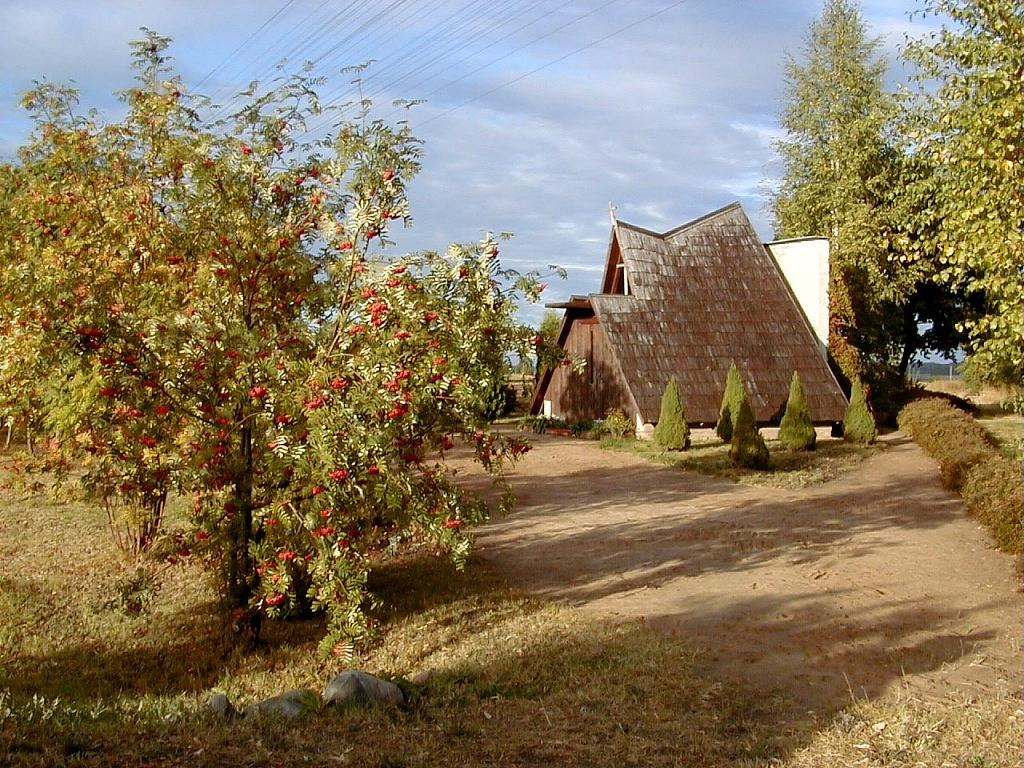
Crucifix hut in Murmastiene

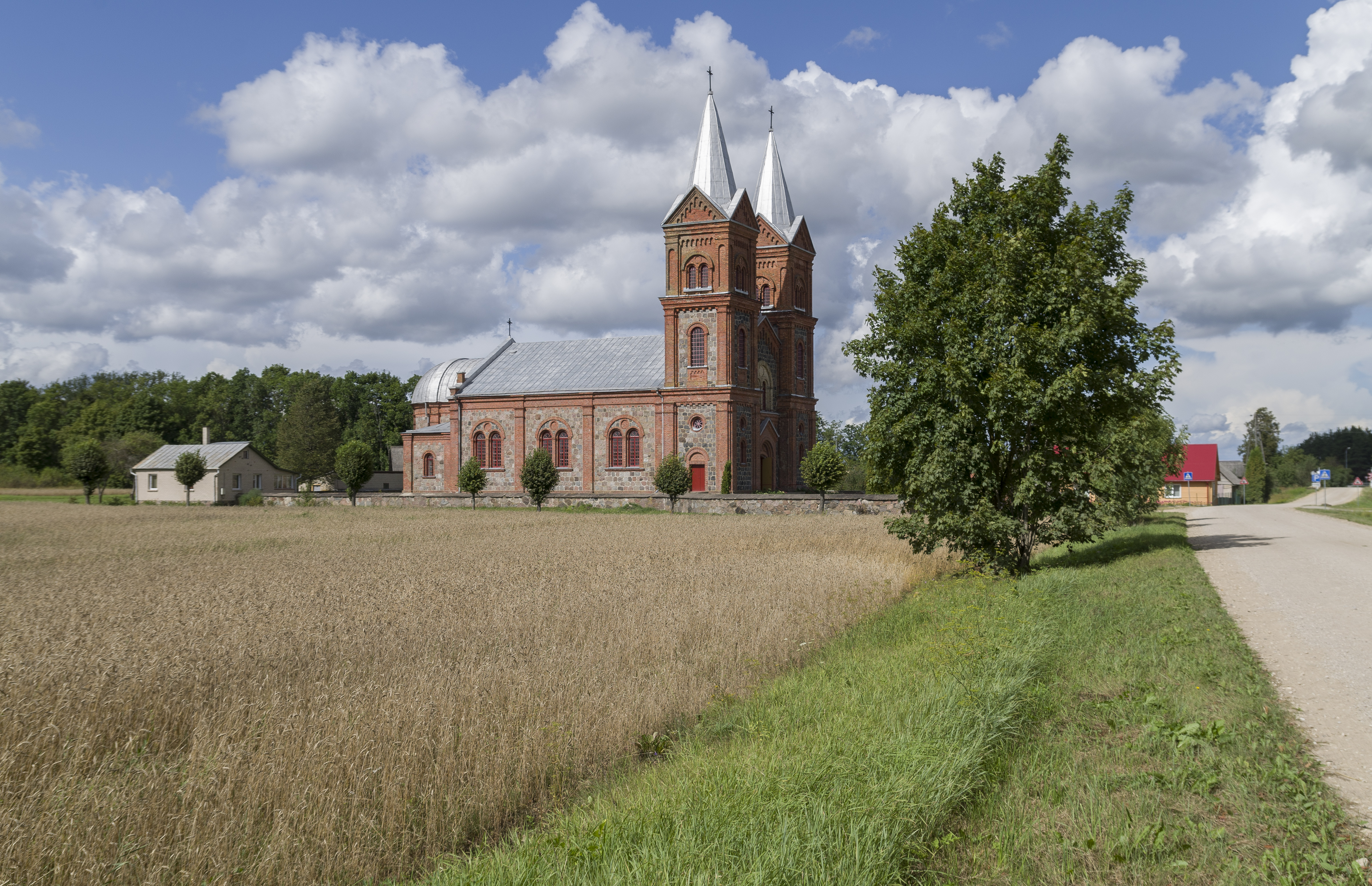
Stirniene Saint Laurentius Catholic Church, Varakļāni Parish

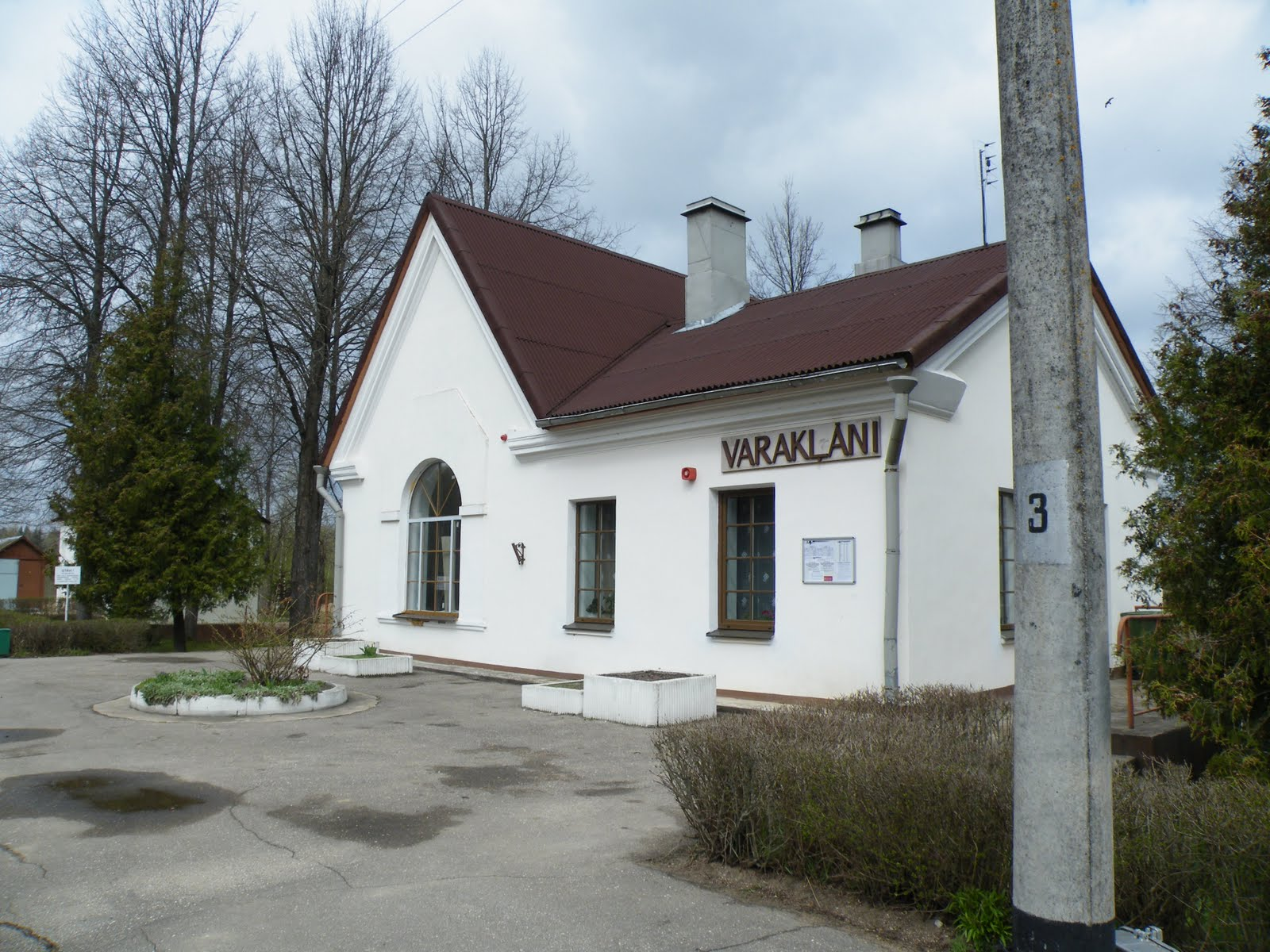
Varakļāni Station

== See also ==
- Administrative divisions of Latvia (2009)
