= Palace Armoury =

Museum in Valletta, Malta

- L-Armerija tal-Palazz
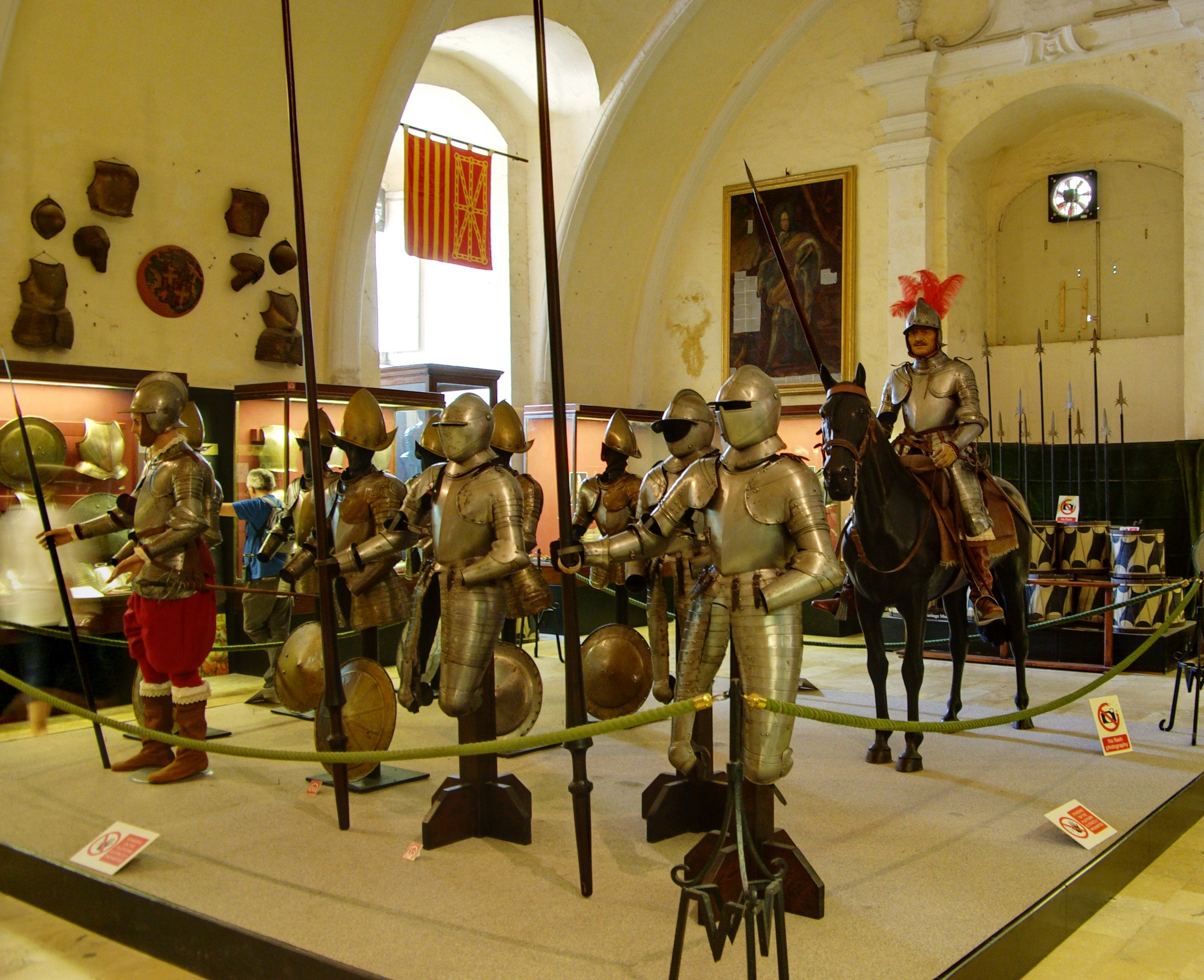
- Suits of armour at the Palace Armoury
- Established: 1604 (armoury); 1860 (museum)
- Location: Grandmaster's Palace, Valletta, Malta
- Coordinates: 35°53′56″N 14°30′50″E
- Type: Armoury
- Owner: Government of Malta
- Public transit access: 500m walk from City Gate
- Website: Heritage Malta

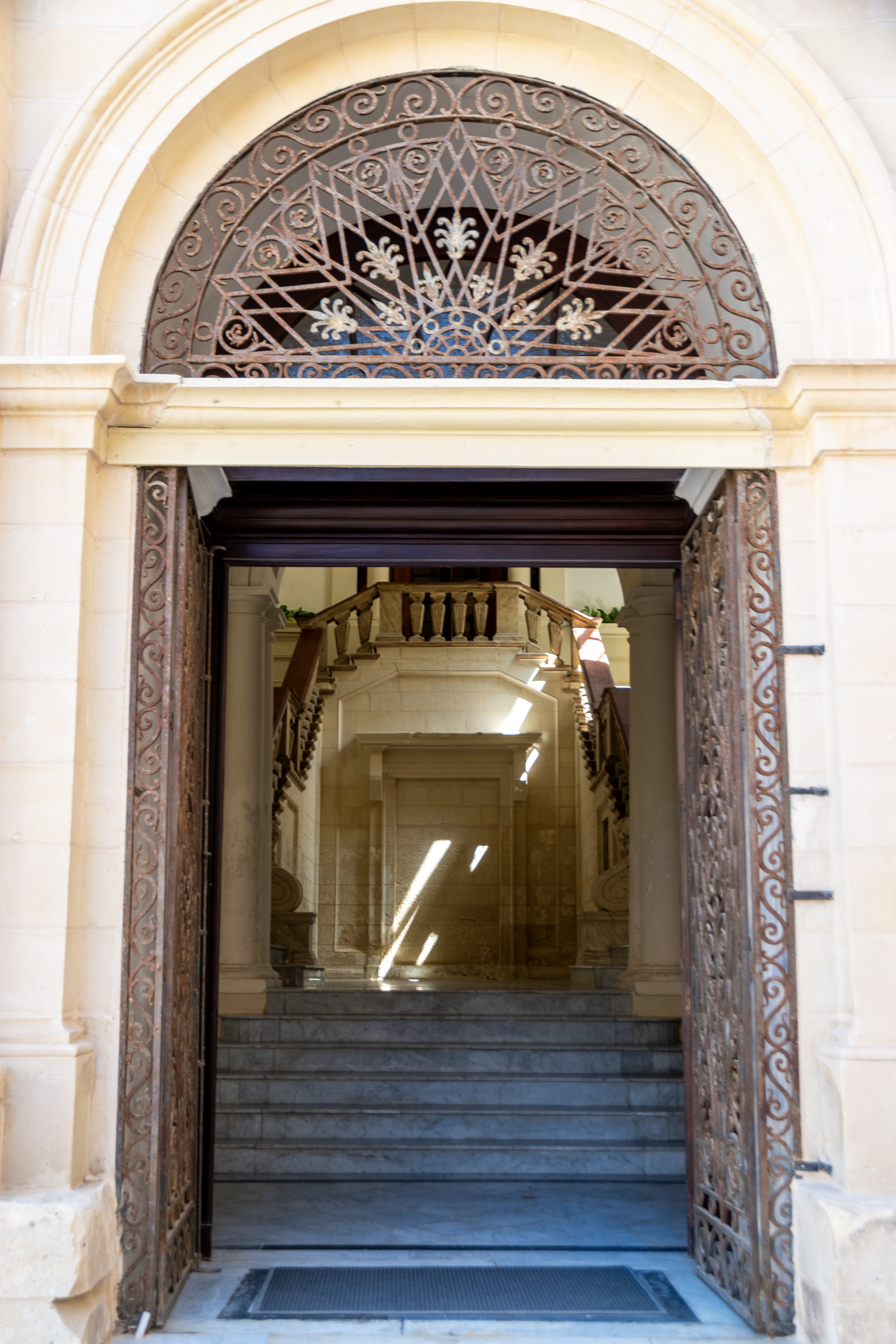
Entrance to the Palace Armoury from Prince Alfred's Courtyard, 2025

The Palace Armoury (Maltese: L-Armerija tal-Palazz) is an arms collection housed at the Grandmaster's Palace in Valletta, Malta. It was the main armoury of the Order of St. John in the 17th and 18th centuries, and as such it was the last arsenal established by a crusader military order. Although today only a part of the original armoury still survives, it is still one of the world's largest collections of arms and armour still housed in its original building. The Palace Armoury has been open to the public as a museum since 1860.

== History ==
In 1604, the Order's arsenal was transferred to the Grandmaster's Palace by Alof de Wignacourt, and was housed in a large hall at the rear of the building. At the time, it contained enough arms and armour for thousands of soldiers. The armoury was rearranged under Manuel Pinto da Fonseca's magistracy in the 18th century.

Parts of the armoury are believed to have been removed and shipped to France during the French occupation of Malta in 1798–1800, as part of "the organised robbery of art treasure and historic treasures" carried out by Napoleon. In the early 19th century, the armoury was altered by the British with the addition of Egyptian style column-like supports. These were removed and returned to England in 1855.

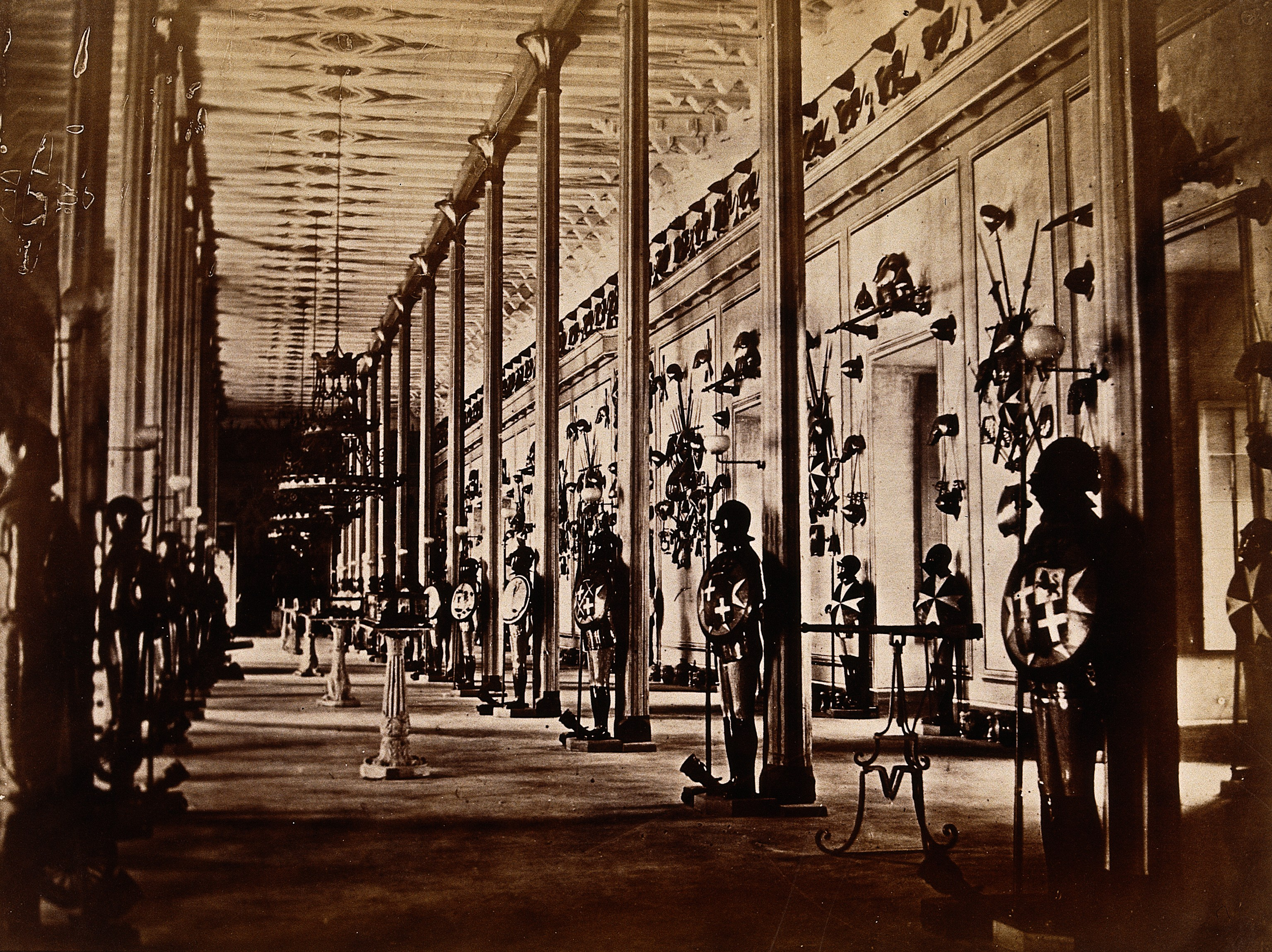
Palace Armoury in the 1880s

In the late 1850s, the armoury was restored under the personal direction of Governor John Gaspard Le Marchant, and it opened to the public as a museum in 1860. In around 1900, the armoury's collections were catalogued by Guy Francis Laking, who published a book entitled The Armoury of The Knights of St. John of Jerusalem.

In World War II, the hall housing the armoury was damaged by aerial bombardment on 7 April 1942. The collections were subsequently transferred to the basement of the Grandmaster's Palace or to Girgenti Palace for safekeeping. The hall was repaired after the war, and the armoury reopened in 1948. In 1969, UNESCO sent Polish experts Aleksander Czerwiński and Zdzisław Żygulski to make an inventory of the armoury, and they called it one of "the most valuable historic monuments of European culture" in their report.

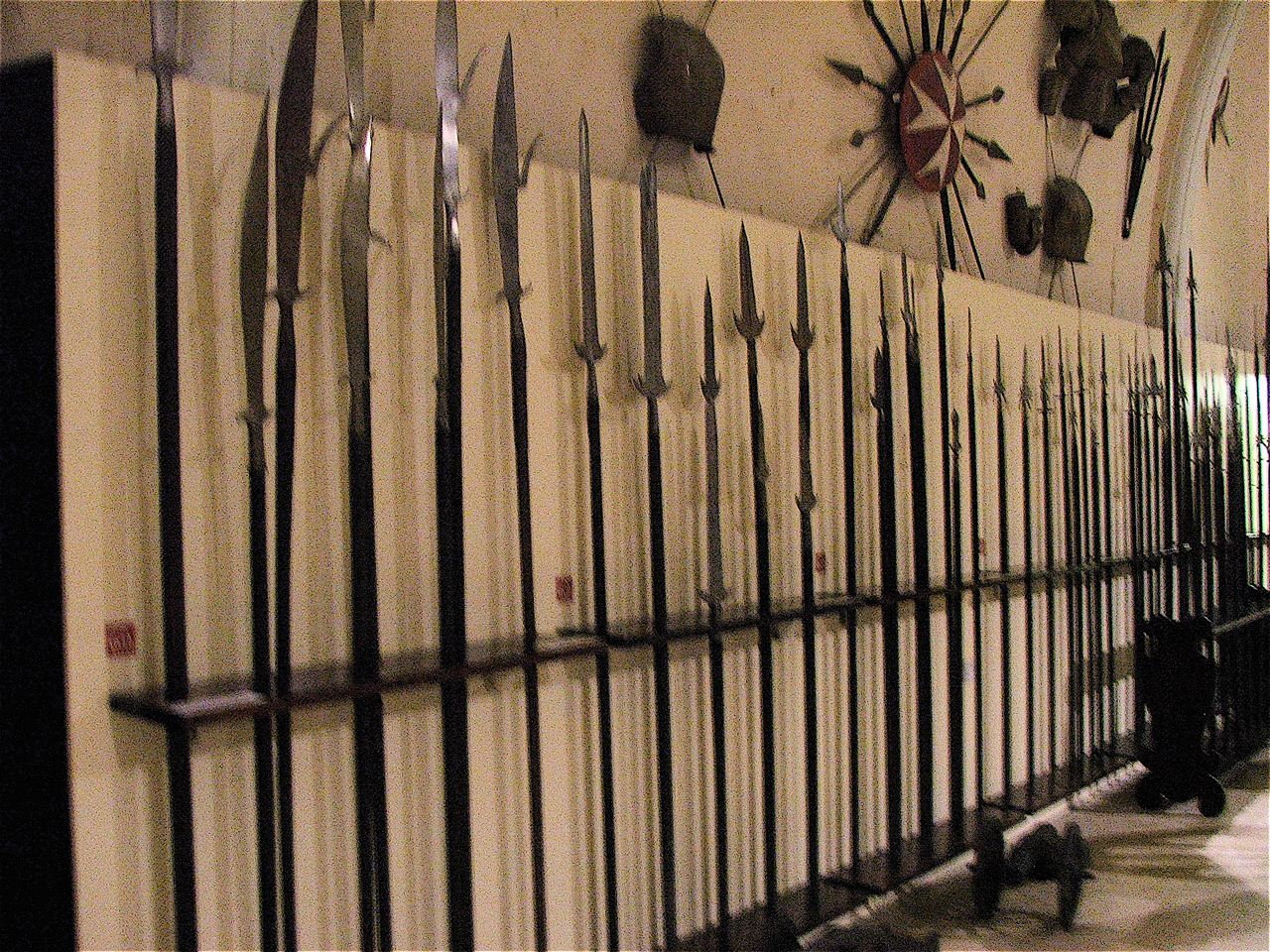
Pikes in the Palace Armoury

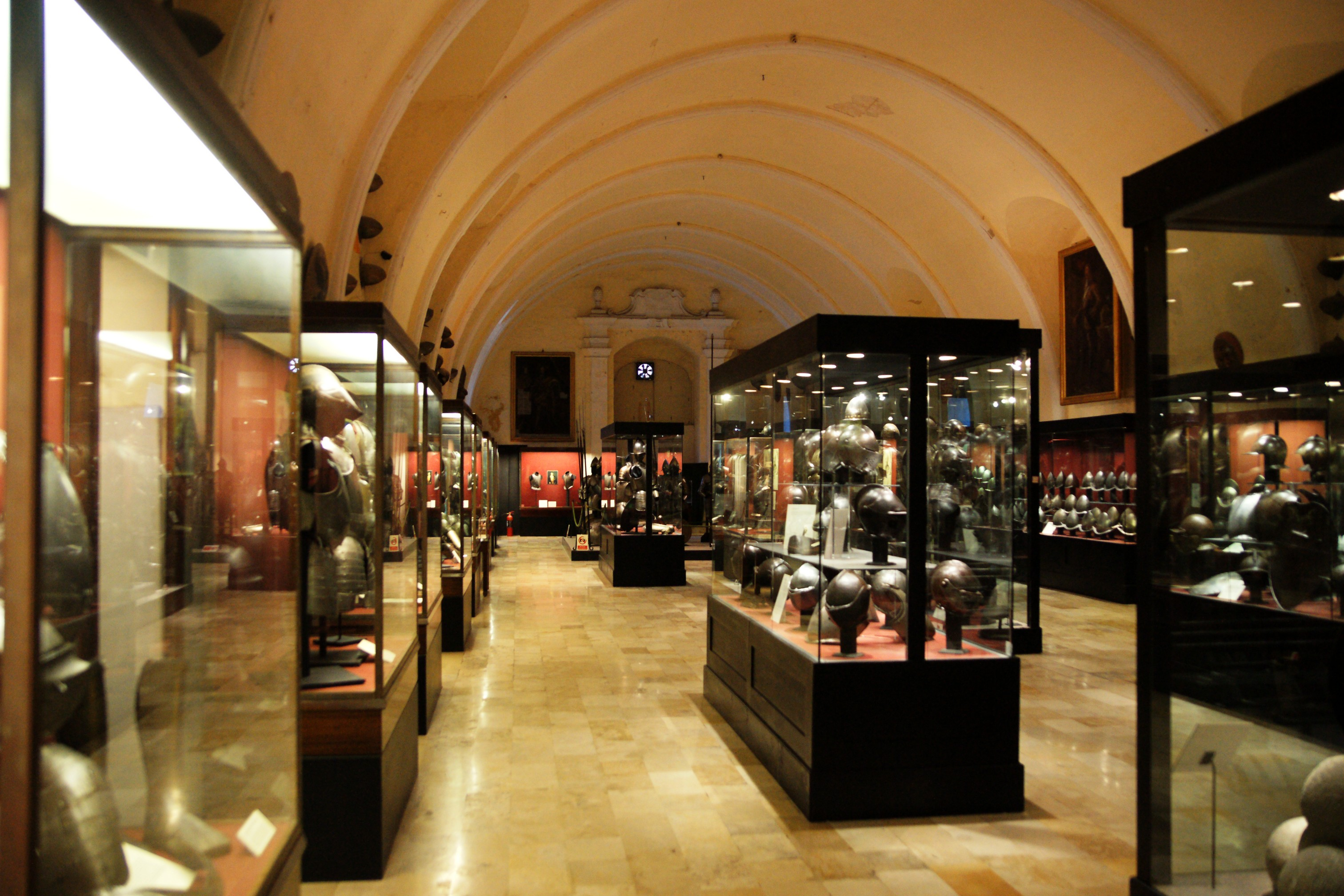
Overview of the Palace Armoury

In 1975, the collection was transferred from its original location to two former stables on the palace's ground floor, where it remains today. The original armoury was converted into the meeting place of the Parliament of Malta, and was used as such from 1976 to 2015, when a new purpose-built Parliament House was inaugurated near the entrance of Valletta.

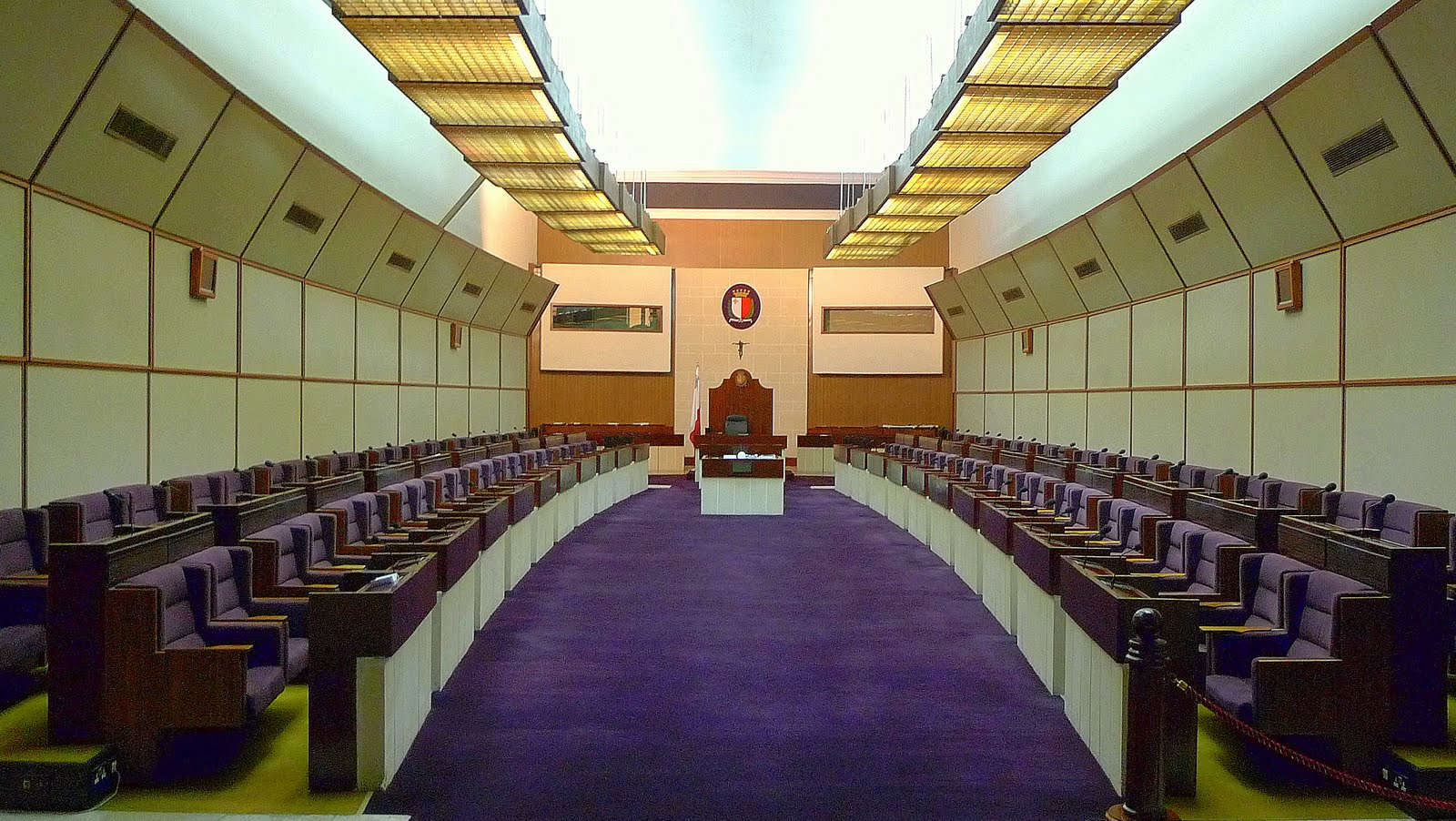
The old Parliament chamber in the Armoury, 2010

A study of the armoury was carried out by historian Stephen C. Spiteri in 2003.

Today, the museum is managed by Heritage Malta, and it is open daily from 9.00 to 17.00.

== Collection ==
Internal entrance to the Palace Armoury

The collections of the Palace Armoury include:

- several suits of armour belonging to knights of the Order of St. John, mainly dating from around 1550 to 1650. These include the personal armour of Grand Masters Martin Garzez and Alof de Wignacourt, and Grand Commander Jean-Jacques de Verdelin.
- many suits of battle armour for regular soldiers, dating from around 1550 to 1650. These were mainly manufactured in Italy, but some were made locally or in France, Spain or Germany.
- many firearms, swords, and other weapons, dating from the 16th to the 18th centuries. These include some Ottoman arms captured during the Great Siege of Malta in 1565.
- several cannon and other artillery pieces, which were used to arm the various fortifications of Malta. These date back to the 15th to 18th centuries. Two of the cannons were retrieved from sea in 1964 from a knights period shipwreck in Mellieħa.

Some modern armament dating back to World War I and World War II was also included in the collection. When the armoury was moved in 1975, these were transferred to the National War Museum in Fort Saint Elmo.
