= Murmastiene Parish =

Parish in Madona Municipality, Latvia

- parish of Latvia
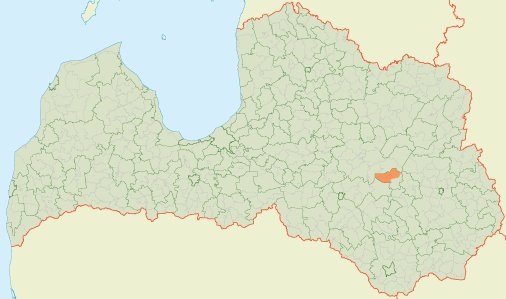
- 56°39′05″N 26°34′12″E
- Country: Latvia

Area
  - Total: 173.39 km^{2} (66.95 sq mi)
  - Land: 169.33 km^{2} (65.38 sq mi)
  - Water: 4.06 km^{2} (1.57 sq mi)

Population (1 January 2024)
  - Total: 633
  - Density: 3.7/km^{2} (9.5/sq mi)

Murmastiene Parish (Latvian: Murmastienes pagasts, Latgalian: Mūrmastinis pogosts) is an administrative unit of Madona Municipality, Latvia. Its center is the village of Murmastiene.

The parish was split off Barkava Parish in 1990 and initially was a part of Madona district. From 2009 to 2025 it was a part of Varakļāni Municipality. The parish covered the northern and western parts of the municipality.

== Towns, villages and settlements of Murmastiene parish ==
- Murmastiene
- Silagals
- Tiltagals
- Vecumnieki
