= Michał Jan Borch =

Polish naturalist

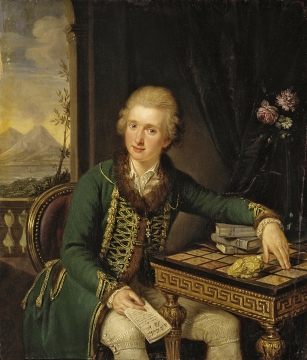
Michał Jan Borch

Michał Jan Borch (German: Michael Johann von der Borch, Russian: Михаэль Иоганн фон дер Борх, Latvian: Mihaels fon der Borhs, 20 June 1753 – 28 December [O.S. 16 December] 1810) was a Polish-Livonian naturalist and writer. It is interesting to mention the impact of Polish Count Michał Jan Borch in understanding the nature of truffles. The whitish truffle (Tuber borchii) is named after him.

== Biography ==
=== Ancestry ===
Michał Jan Borch came from the Courlandish branch of the noble family von der Borch. His parents were the Polish chancellor Jan Andrzej Borch (1715-1780) and Ludwika Anna von Syberg (1725–1788). He was born in Varakļāni in present-day Latvia.

=== Career ===
Michał Jan Borch was educated and raised at the family estate by French teachers, as well as partly in Poland, to some extent at the Collegium Pium in Warsaw. He entered Polish military service in 1762 and obtained the rank of colonel in the hussars no later than 1776. According to some sources, he was wounded by Stanisław Strawiński during the kidnapping of Stanisław August Poniatowski in 1771 while trying to protect the king. Thanks to his loyalty and to his skill, he was promoted to Quartermaster general of Lithuania in 1781, became a member of the Ministry of War in 1786 and eventually promoted to Lieutenant General. In addition, he was made starost of Ludza (Latgale) in 1772 and from 1787 voivode of the Belz Voivodeship (today in Ukraine), where he promoted the spreading of the Polish language.

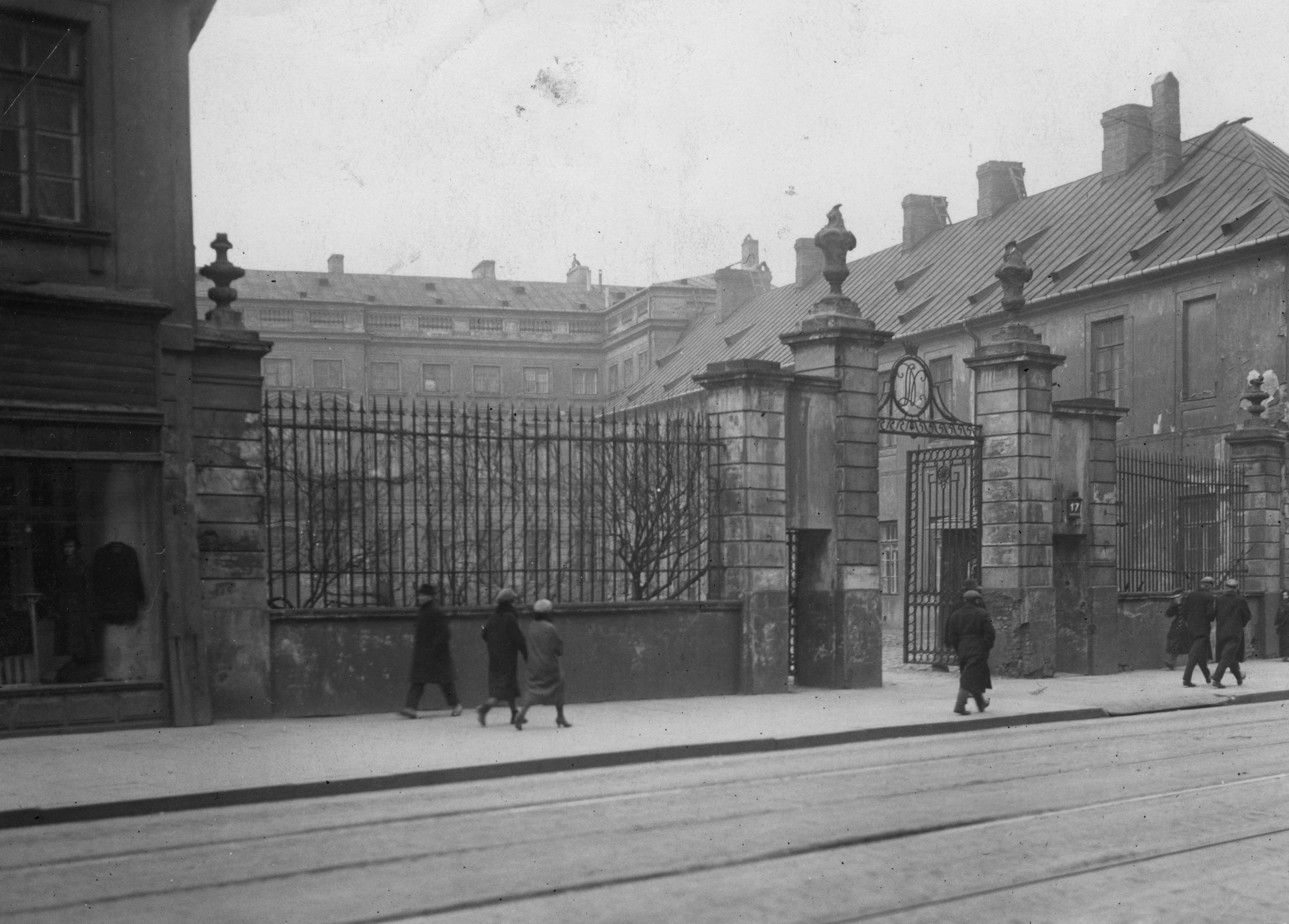
Borchów Palace in Warsaw, owned by Jan Borch, since 1843 the main seat of Archbishops of Warsaw

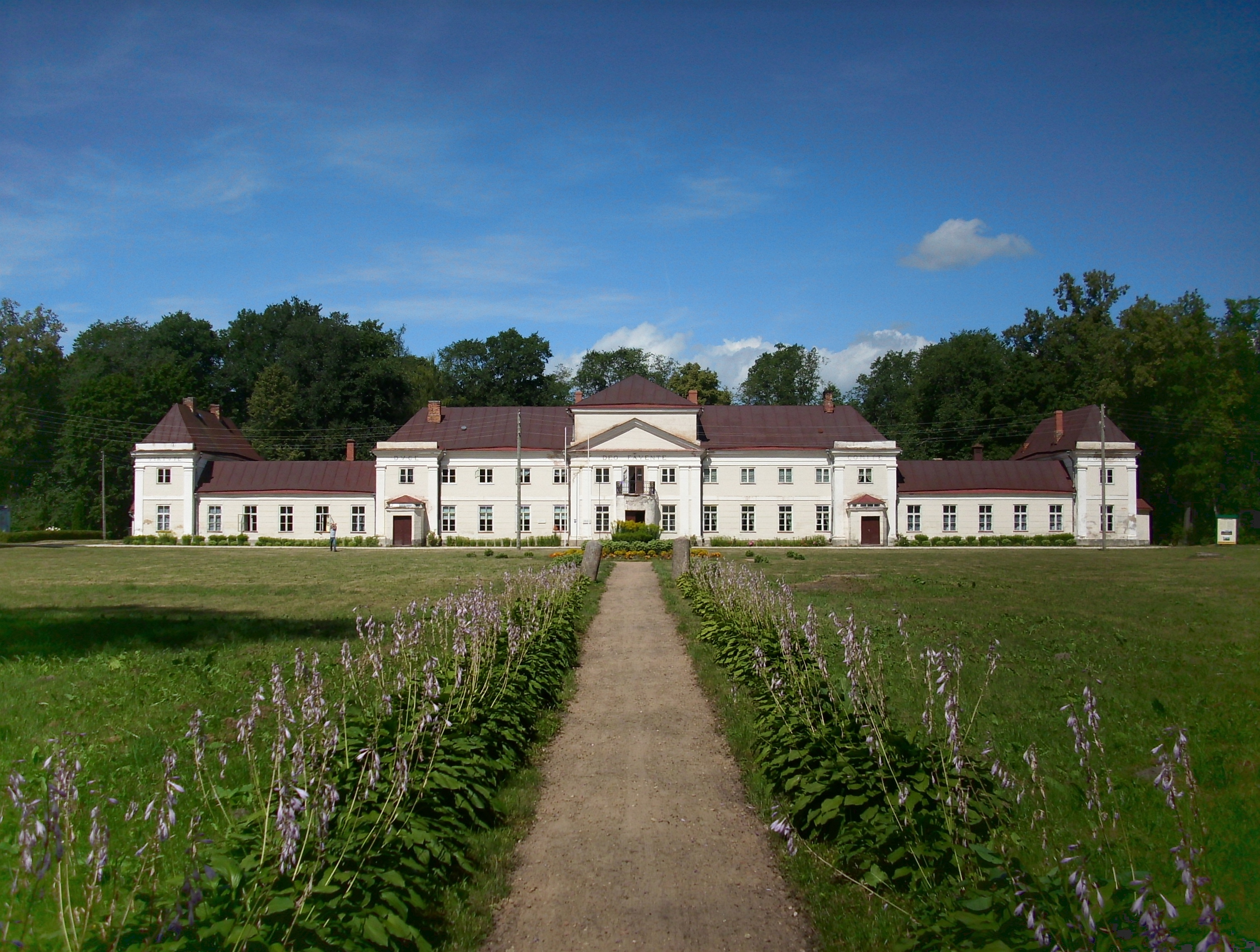
Varakļāni Palace built by Michał Jan Borch

Between 1774 and 1778 he conducted an extensive Grand Tour through Germany, France, Switzerland and Italy. His tour included a visit to the Sovereign Military Order of Malta on Malta. He was inspired to visit Sicily and Malta by reading the then-popular book A Tour through Sicily and Malta by Patrick Brydone. On Sicily he dedicated himself to extensive studies of mineralogy between September 1776 and April 1777. He published the results of his studies in seven Italian scientific publications and later, in extended form, as books translated into French. In his Italian Journey, Johann Wolfgang von Goethe speaks favourably of von der Borch. His extensive natural history collections where still piously preserved in the castle of Varakļāni as late as 1868. In recognition of his work as a naturalist, the Brachiopod Bicarinatina borchi is named after von der Borch.

In 1783, he was elevated to the rank of Imperial Count by the Holy Roman Emperor Joseph II.

In 1790 he traveled to England on a mission for the Polish king, whose complete trust von der Borch enjoyed. Following the Third Partition of Poland he retired from all official duties and settled on his estate in Varakļāni. Already in 1789 he had hired the Italian architect Vincenzo de Mazotti to rebuild Varakļāni Palace and redesign the garden of the estate, which had been in the family since 1483.

Among other decorations, Michał Jan Borch was awarded the Order of the Lion of Bavaria, the Order of Saint Stanislaus and the Order of the White Eagle. As a writer he concentrated on natural sciences, maintained international scientific contacts and was a member of several academies.

=== Family ===
In 1783 he married Countess Eleonore Christina von Browne of Camus (1766–1844) in Riga, the daughter of the Russian governor general of Livonia George Browne. The couple had seven children:

- Karol Jerzy Jan (1787-1861)
- Zofia (1795-1880)
- Eliza Luiza Izabella (1796-1870)
- Izabela Amerlia Marianna (1799-1862)
- Anna Klara Julia (1801-1869)
- Aleksander Antoni Stanisław (1804-1867)
- Józef Kazimierz Piotr (1807-1881)

== Works ==
- Ode... pour la séance publique du premier d'Avril de la conversation galante de Monsieur le prince di Campofranco.... Palermo 1777.
- Lettres sur la Sicile et sur l'île de Malthe ... écrites en 1777. Pour servir de supplément au voyage en Sicile et à Malthe de Monsieur Brydonne. Berne 1785.
- Lythologie sicilienne ou Catalogue raisonné de toutes les pierres de la Sicile propres à embellir le cabinet d'un amateur. Naples 1777.
- Lythologie sicilienne, en connaissance de la nature des pierres de la Sicile, suivie d'un discours sur la Catcara de Palerme. Rome 1778.
- Minéralogie sicilienne docimastique et métallurgique ou Connaissance de tous les minéraux que produit l'île de Sicile, avec les détails des mines et des carrières et l'histoire des travaux anciens et actuels de ce pays. Suivie de la minér-hydrologie sicilienne, ou la description de toutes les eaux minérales de la Sicile. Turin 1780.
- Lettres sur les truffes du Piémont, écrites en 1780. Milan 1780.
- Victor Amédée. Tragédie en 5 actes et en vers, par l'auteur de la Minéralogie sicilienne. Warsaw 1789.
- La Stanislaĭde ou l'Heureuse délivrance de Stanislas II roi de Pologne. Poème. Warsaw 1791.
- Histoire de la vie de George de Browne, comte du Saint-Empire, gouverneur général de Livonie et d'Esthonie…, Riga 1794 (Digitalised); = L. Schubert: Leben des Reichsgr. Georg von Browne, General-Gouverneur von Liefland und Esthland, Oberfeldherr der Russischen Armeen. Johann Friedrich Hartknoch, Riga 1795 (Digitalised).
- Jardin sentimental du château de Warkland dans le Comté de Borch en Russie Blanche, Warsaw 1795.
