= Barkava Parish =

Parish of Latvia

- parish of Latvia
- Coat of arms

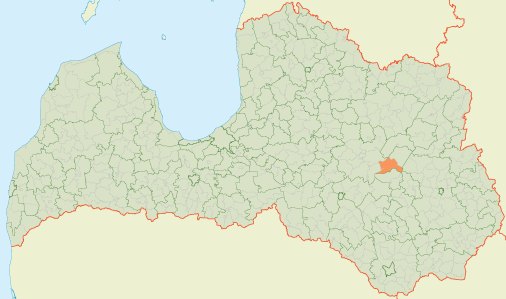
- 56°43′53″N 26°35′39″E
- Country: Latvia

Area
  - Total: 189.12 km^{2} (73.02 sq mi)
  - Land: 184.45 km^{2} (71.22 sq mi)
  - Water: 4.67 km^{2} (1.80 sq mi)

Population (1 January 2025)
  - Total: 1,103
  - Density: 5.980/km^{2} (15.49/sq mi)
- Website: www.barkava.lv

Barkava Parish (Latvian: Barkavas pagasts) is an administrative unit of Madona Municipality, Latvia. The earliest source noting Barkava Parish as a territory dates back to 1866. In 1873 Barkava Parish merged with Murmastiene Parish. The first noted area of Barkava Parish was 277.2 km^{2}, and was located in Rezekne district. The first noted population was 5235 inhabitants according to the Fourth Population and Housing Census in Latvia.
