= Varakļāni =

Town in Madona Municipality, Latvia

- Town
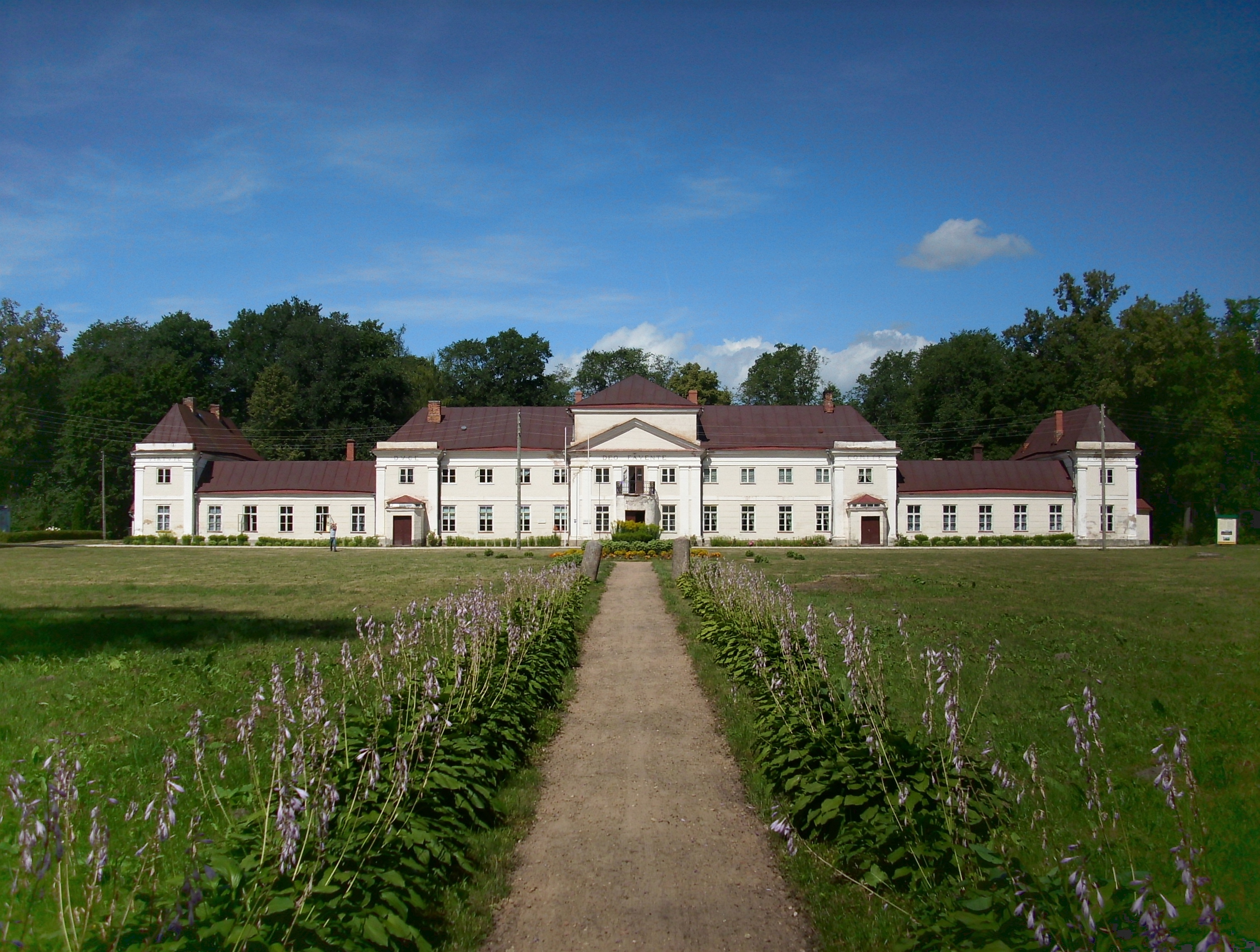
- Varakļāni Palace in Varakļāni

- Coat of arms

- Location in Latvia
- Coordinates: 56°36′28″N 26°45′18″E
- Country: Latvia
- Municipality: Madona Municipality
- Town rights: 1928

Government
  - Mayor: Māris Justs (LA)

Area
  - Total: 5.32 km^{2} (2.05 sq mi)
  - Land: 5.24 km^{2} (2.02 sq mi)
  - Water: 0.08 km^{2} (0.031 sq mi)

Population (2026)
  - Total: 1,600
  - Density: 310/km^{2} (790/sq mi)
- Time zone: UTC+2 (EET)
  - Summer (DST): UTC+3 (EEST)
- Postal code: LV-4838
- Calling code: +371 648
- Number of city council members: 9
- Website: http://www.varaklani.lv/

Varakļāni (Polish: Warklany, German: Warkland, Yiddish: וואַרקלאַן, Russian: Варакляны) is a town in Madona Municipality and the Latgale historical region of Latvia. The population in 2020 was 1,740.

== History ==
The town of Varakļāni was founded and established in the Russian Empire in the 18th century.

Varakļāni Palace is located in Varakļāni.

=== Jews in Varakļāni ===
Varakļāni had a sizeable population of Jews throughout much of its history, ending with the Holocaust. Towards the end of the 19th century, Jews comprised about 75% of the population. Various pogroms, expulsions, WWI and the Russian Revolutions brought the Jewish population down considerably. Several hundred Jews left with the Russians in preparation of the Nazi advance. The Nazis forced 540 remaining Jews to dig their own graves, and then shot them to death in a mass shooting on 4 August 1941. Jewish historical records, including online resources, contain much information about community leadership, organizations, and general town information.

== Notable people ==
- Michał Jan Borch, (1753–1810) Polish-Livonian statesman, naturalist and writer
- Ray Alexander Simons, (1913–2004) Anti-apartheid activist

== See also ==
- List of cities in Latvia
