= Varakļāni Palace =

Palace in Varakļāni, Latvia

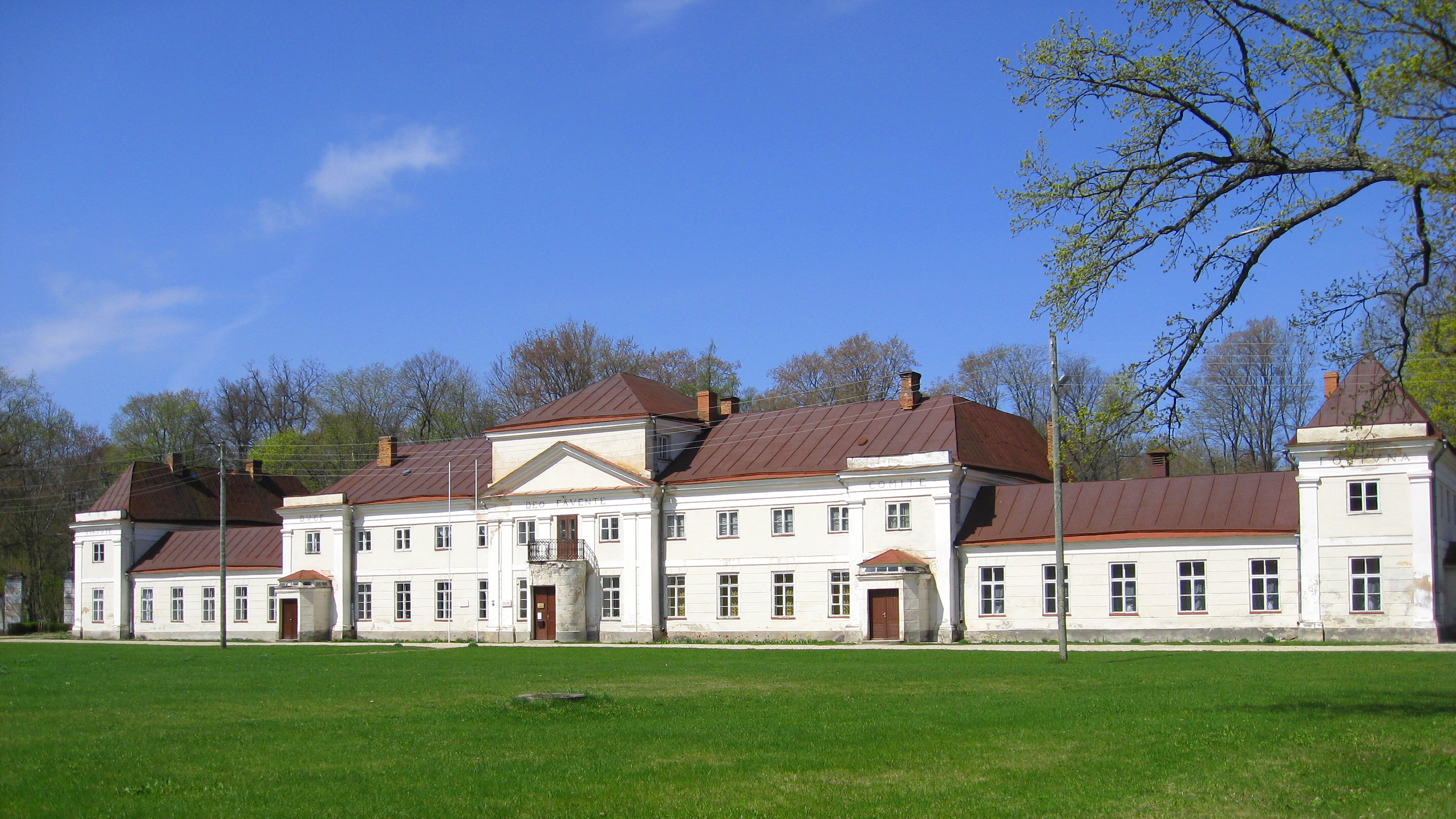

- Location within Latvia

General information
- Architectural style: Classicism
- Location: Varakļāni, Latvia
- Coordinates: 56.607°N 26.776°E
- Construction started: 1783
- Completed: 1789
- Client: Michał Jan Borch

Design and construction
- Architect: Vincenzo de Mazotti

Varakļāni Palace (Latvian: Varakļānu muižas pils) is a palace in Varakļāni, Madona Municipality, in the historical region of Latgale, in Latvia.

== History ==
After the end of the Livonian War in 1583, von der Borch family acquired the Vark castle district, it was called "Vark land" (German: Warkland, Warkelen). The palace was designed by the Italian architect Vincenzo Macotti at the request of the estate owner, the Polish–Lithuanian Commonwealth diplomat Count Michał Jan Borch. Construction started in 1783 and completed in 1789.

After the death of Count Borch in 1810, his wife, Eleonor Christine (1766-1844), and later their son, Karol Borch (1798-1861), whose daughter Maria married Paweł Roman Sanguszko (1834–1876), operated the palace. After his death, the manor was inherited by their daughter, Teresa Sanguszko-Kowelska (1864-1954), who married Leon Paweł Sapieha (1856-1893).

After Latvian Agrarian Reform in 1920s Varakļāni Manor was nationalized and subdivided. From 1921 to 1944 the Varakļāni State Gymnasium, later until 1961 the senior classes of Varakļāni High School, operated in the castle. At the end of World War II the castle was a military hospital.

The building housed the Varakļāni secondary school from 1921 to 1960. In the mid-1980s the castle conservation works began. At the entrance of the castle there is a memorial plaque for the linguist Leonard Latkovsky. Since 1997, the castle has housed the Varakļāni Regional Museum, which since 2009 has been the Tourist Information Center. The palace and grounds are currently administered by the town of Varakļāni.

== See also ==
- List of palaces and manor houses in Latvia
