= Patrick Brydone =

Scottish traveller and author

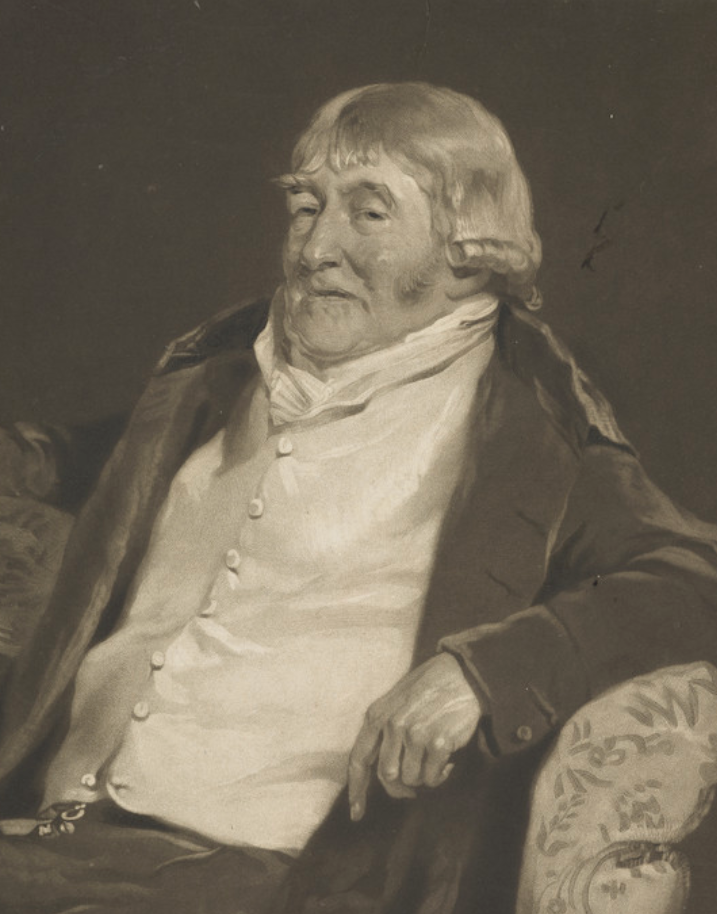
Patrick Brydone

Patrick Brydone, FRSE, FRS, FSAScot, FSA (5 January 1736 – 19 June 1818) was a Scottish traveller and author who served as Comptroller of the Stamp Office.

== Life ==
Map from A Tour Through Sicily and Malta (1806)

Brydone was born in Coldingham, Berwickshire, on 5 January 1736, the son of Robert Brydone (1687–1761), the local Church of Scotland minister, and Elizabeth Dysart.

After attending St. Andrews University, he went abroad as travelling tutor or companion (colloquially known as a bearleader), with William Beckford and some other gentlemen. In 1767 or 1768, soon after his return from Switzerland, he went abroad again with Beckford and two others as travelling preceptor. In 1770, he made a tour with these gentlemen through Sicily and Malta, the former island being but little known to travellers of that time.

This tour forms the subject of his book, A Tour through Sicily and Malta, in a Series of Letters to William Beckford, Esq., of Somerly in Suffolk, published in 1773. His work became popular for its descriptions of Italy. It was favourably reviewed, and so well received by the reading public, that it went through seven or eight editions in England in his lifetime, and was also translated into French and German. In Italy, nine years after its publication, Count Borch published a volume of Letters to serve as Supplement to the Voyage in Sicily and Malta of Mr. Brydone.

Brydone was elected Fellow of the Royal Society in 1773, as 'a Gentleman of good Character, well versed in several Branches of Natural Knowledge, and already known by two Papers of Experiments upon Electricity, published in the Transactions'. His nominees included John Pringle, Benjamin Franklin, John Hunter, Thomas Dundas, Rudolph de Valltravers and Richard Huck.

In 1783 he became a founder member of the Royal Society of Edinburgh. He held the appointment of Comptroller of the Stamp Office, a fore-runner of the Inland Revenue. The latter part of his life was spent in retirement and he died on 19 June 1818 at Lennel House in Berwickshire.

== Family ==
In 1785 he married Mary Robertson, the daughter of Prof William Robertson. They had three daughters the eldest of whom, Mary, married Gilbert Elliot who became the 2nd Earl of Minto.

== Major works ==
- A Tour Through Sicily and Malta. London: T. Cadell & W. Davies. 1806 [1773].
