= Maltese alphabet =

Latin-based alphabet of the Maltese language

The Maltese alphabet is based on the Latin alphabet with the addition of some letters with diacritic marks and digraphs. It is used to write the Maltese language, which evolved from the otherwise extinct Siculo-Arabic dialect, as a result of 800 years of independent development. It contains 30 letters: 24 consonants and 6 vowels (a, e, i, o, u, ie).

Uppercase	A	B	Ċ	D	E	F	Ġ	G	Għ	H	Ħ	I	Ie	J	K	L	M	N	O	P	Q	R	S	T	U	V	W	X	Ż	Z
Lowercase	a	b	ċ	d	e	f	ġ	g	għ	h	ħ	i	ie	j	k	l	m	n	o	p	q	r	s	t	u	v	w	x	ż	z

There are two types of Maltese consonants:

- Konsonanti xemxin (sun consonants): ċ d n r s t x ż z
- Konsonanti qamrin (moon consonants): b f ġ g għ h ħ j k l m p q v w

== Samples ==
Letter	IPA	Words	First Word	Last Word
A a	/ɐ/	abjad (white), anġlu (Angel), aċċola (amberjack), aħjar (better), Amerika (America), azzarin (rifle), ankra (anchor)	abbaku (abacus)	azzjonist (shareholder)
B b	/b/	ballun (ball), berquq (apricot), bellus (velvet), burò (bureau), bżar (pepper)	bababa (say for nothing)	bżulija (diligence)
Ċ ċ	/t͡ʃ/	ċaċċiż (frame), ċarezza (clearness), ċikkulata (chocolate), ċitazzjoni (ticket), ċoff (bow), ċurkett (ring)	ċabattin (cobbler)	ċuwingam (chewing gum)
D d	/d/	daħka (laugh), damma (dice), dawl (light), debba (mare), Dumnikan (Dominican), dura (hut)	dab (he melted)	dwett (duet)
E e	/ɛ/	elf (one thousand), ekkleżjastikament (ecclesiastically), erbgħa ([[4| four]] (4), erba' (fourth), Ewropew (European), eżilju (exile)	ebbanist (ebonist)	eżumazzjonijiet (exhumations)
F f	/f/	fallakka (plank), fehma (understanding), Franċiż (French), futbol (football), fwieħa (perfume)	fabbli (affable)	fwieħa (perfume)
Ġ ġ	/d͡ʒ/	ġabra (collection), ġenerazzjoni (generation), ġewnaħ (wing), Ġunju (June), ġwież (walnuts)	ġa (already)	ġwież (pulse)
G g	/ɡ/	gabarrè (tray), gejxa (geisha), grad (degree), Grieg (Greek), gżira (island)	gabardin (gabardine)	gżira (island)
Għ għ	/ˤ/	għada (tomorrow), għajn (eye), għamara (furniture), għemeż (he winked), għid (feast), għuda (wood)	għa (hoy!)	għuda (wood)
H h	-- (silent)	hedded (he threatened), hena (happiness), hi (she), hu (he), huma (they)		
Ħ ħ	/ħ/	ħabaq (basil), ħabsi (prisoner), ħajja (life), ħu (brother), ħażen (badness)	ħa (take)	ħuttafa (swallow)
I i	/ɛː/, /iːᵊ/	iben (son), idroġenu (hydrogen), induratur (gilder), Ingilterra (England), iżraq (azure)	ibbies (grew hard)	iżżuffjetta (to deride)
Ie ie	/ɪ/, /ɛ/	iebes (hard), ieħor (another), ieqaf (stop)	iebes (hard)	ieqaf (stop)
J j	/j/	jaf (knows), jarda (yard), jasar (imprisonment), jew (or), jott (yacht), jum (day)	ja (oh!)	jupp (hah!)
K k	/k/	kabina (cabin), kaligrafija (calligraphy), Kalifornja (California), karru (wagon), kurżità (curiosity)	kaballetta (cabaletta)	Kżar (Czar)
L l	/l/	labirint (maze), lejl (night), lejla (evening), Lhudi (Hebrew), lvant (east)	la (nor)	lwiża (vervain three-leaved)
M m	/m/	Malti (Maltese), maternità (maternity), Mediterran (Mediterranean), mina (tunnel), mżelleġ (smudged)	mama' (mother)	mżużi (nasty)
N n	/n/	nadif (clean), nerv (nerve), niċċa (niche), nuċċali (spectacles), nżul ix-xemx (sunset)	nabba (to foretell)	nżul (descending)
O o	/ɔ/	oċean (ocean), opra (opera), orizzont (horizon), ors (bear), ożonu (ozone)	oasi (oasis)	ożmjum (osmium)
P p	/p/	paċi (peace), paragrafu (paragraph), pazjent (patient), poeta (poet), pultruna (armchair)	paċi (peace)	pużata (cover)
Q q	/ʔ/	qabar (grave), qaddis (saint), qalb (heart), qoxra (shell), qażquż (piglet)	qabad (caught)	qżużijat (nastiness)
R r	/r/	raba' (land), raff (garret), replika (replica), riħa (smell), rvell (rebellion)	ra (he saw)	rżit (lean)
S s	/s/	saba' (finger), safi (clear), saqaf (ceiling), serrieq (saw), suttana (gown)	sa (until)	swiċċ (switch)
T t	/t/	tabakk (tobacco), tarġa (step), terrazzin (belvedere), Turkija (Turkey), twissija (warning), tuffieħa (apple)	ta (gave)	twittijat (levelling)
U u	/ʊ/	udjenza (audience), uffiċċju (office), uman (human), uviera (egg-cup), użin (weight)	ubbidjent (obedient)	użinijiet (weights)
V v	/v/	vaċċin (vaccine), vaska (pond), viċi (vice), vjaġġ (trip), vapur (ship)	vaċċin (vaccine)	vvumtat (vomited)
W w	/w/	warda (rose), werrej (index), wied (valley), wirt (inheritance), wweldjat (welded)	wadab (sling)	wweldjat (welded)
X x	/ʃ/, /ʒ/	xabla (sword), xandir (broadcasting), xehda (honeycomb), xoffa (lip), xxuttjat (kicked)	xaba' (he had enough of)	xxuttjat (kicked)
Ż ż	/z/	żagħżugħ (teenager), żogħżija (youth), żaqq (stomach), żifna (dance), żunżan (wasps), żżuffjetta (he mocked)	żabar (prune)	żżuffjetta (he mocked)
Z z	/t͡s/, /d͡z/	zalliera (salt-cellar), zalza (sauce), zalzett (sausage), zokk (trunk), zuntier (church-square)	zakak (white wagtail)	zzuppjat (crippled)

== Older versions of the alphabet ==
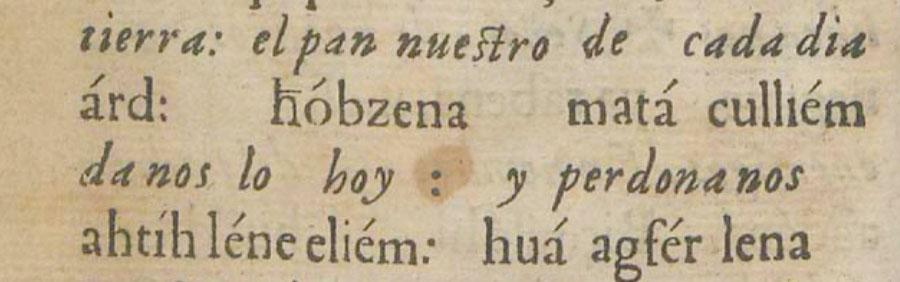
Perez de Ayala's version of the Lord's Prayer in Spanish and Andalusian Arabic (1556), compare to Maltese: ħobżna ta' kuljum agħtihulna llum.

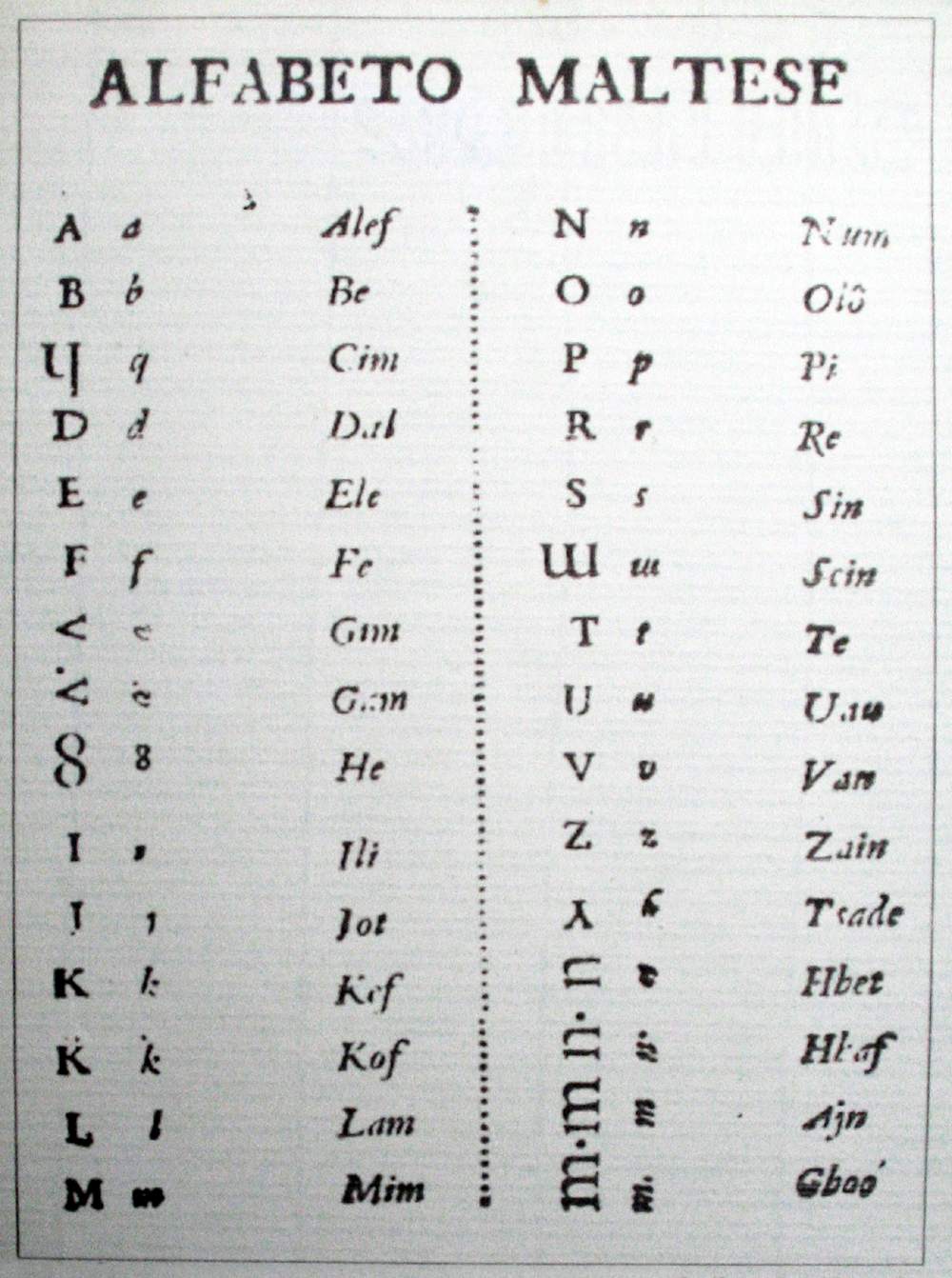
Vassalli's alphabet (1788)

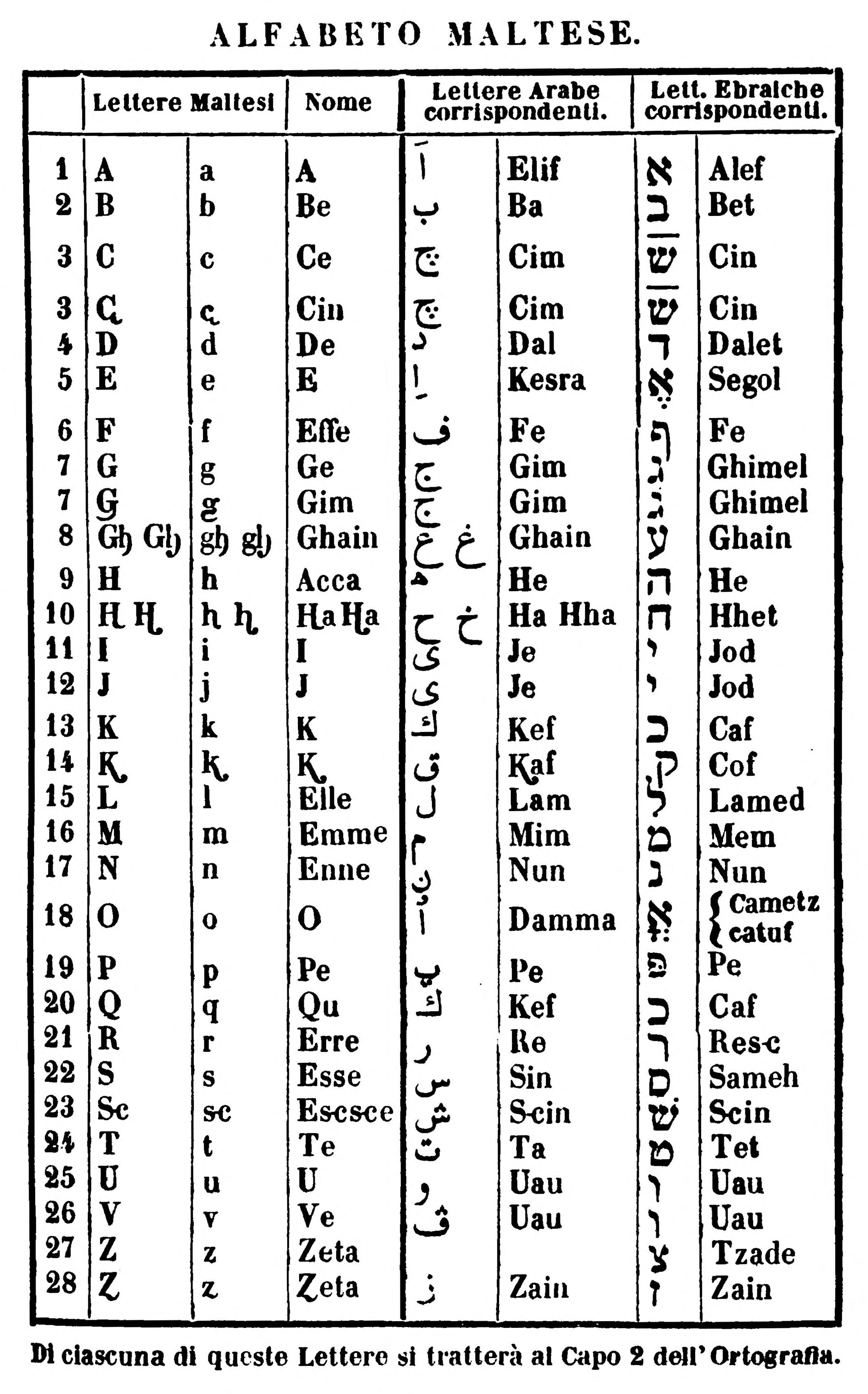
Panzavecchia’s alphabet (1845)

Before the standardisation of the Maltese alphabet, there were several ways of writing the sounds peculiar to Maltese, namely ⟨ċ⟩, ⟨ġ⟩, ⟨għ⟩, ⟨ħ⟩, ⟨w⟩, ⟨x⟩, and ⟨ż⟩.

/t͡ʃ/ was formerly written as ⟨c⟩ (in front of ⟨e⟩ and ⟨i⟩, in Italian fashion). Vella used ⟨ç⟩ for /t͡ʃ/. ⟨ç⟩ was used in other books during the 19th century. Rather than using a c with a cedilla, ⟨ç⟩, Panzavecchia used a c with ogonek ⟨c̨⟩. A Short Grammar of the Maltese Language used ⟨ch⟩ for /t͡ʃ/, in English fashion. However, the first appearance of the letter ⟨ċ⟩ for its current sound was in 1822 in the first ever Maltese written gospel by Martin Cannolo instituting the modern ⟨ċ⟩.

/d͡ʒ/ and /g/, now written with ⟨ġ⟩ and ⟨g⟩ respectively, were formerly confused. When they were differentiated, /g/ was written as ⟨gk⟩, ⟨g⟩, ⟨gh⟩ and (by Vassalli) as a mirrored Arabic/Syriac gimel resembling a sideways V. On the other hand, /d͡ʒ/ was more commonly written as ⟨g⟩ or ⟨j⟩ in English fashion. Vella used a ⟨g⟩ with diaeresis, ⟨g̈⟩, but in 1843 reduced it to one dot. The first appearance for this letter was once again in the first Maltese Gospel by Martin Cannolo instituting yet again the modern ⟨ġ⟩.

Until the middle of the 19th century, two sounds which would merge into /ʕː/ were differentiated in Maltese. These were variously represented as ⟨gh⟩, ⟨ġh⟩, ⟨gh´⟩, ⟨gh˙⟩ and with two letters not represented in Unicode (they resembled an upside down U). Panzavecchia used a specially designed font with a curly ⟨gh⟩. A Short Grammar of the Maltese Language used ⟨a⟩ with a superscript Arabic ʿayn (⟨ع⟩) to represent /ʕː/. ⟨għ⟩ itself was first used in Nuova guida alla conversazione italiana, inglese e maltese.

The letter ⟨ħ⟩ had the most variations before being standardised in 1866. It was variously written as ⟨ch⟩, and as a ⟨h⟩ with various diacritics or curly modifications. Some of these symbols were used for [ħ] and some for [x]. None of these are present in Unicode. The letter ⟨ħ⟩ was first used by Martin Cannolo in the same aforementioned script, although the capital ⟨Ħ⟩ was used later on (in 1845), where its lower case counterpart was a dotted h.

/w/ was written as ⟨w⟩, ⟨u⟩ or as a modified u (not present in Unicode).

The sounds /ʃ/, /ʒ/ (now represented with ⟨x⟩) were traditionally written as ⟨sc⟩ or ⟨x⟩. Vassalli invented a special character similar to ⟨Ɯ⟩, just wider, and Panzavecchia used an ⟨sc⟩ ligature to represent /ʃ/ and /ʒ/, in the Italian fashion. Interestingly, the first ever use of ⟨x⟩ for /ʃ/ was in the first ever Maltese document (that we know of) Il-Kantilena by Pietru Caxaro, which makes sense as he was of Spanish descent (hence the surname) and the Spanish language also used to use the same letter for that sound at the time.

/t͡s/ and /d͡z/ (now represented with ⟨z⟩) were formerly confused with, /z/ (now represented with ⟨ż⟩). When they were differentiated, /t͡s/ and /d͡z/ were written as ⟨ts⟩, ⟨z⟩, ⟨ʒ⟩ or even ⟨ż⟩. On the other hand, /z/ was written as ⟨ż⟩, ⟨ds⟩, ⟨ts⟩, ⟨ʒ⟩ and ⟨z⟩.

Prior to 1900, /k/ was written as ⟨k⟩, as well as ⟨c⟩, ⟨ch⟩ and ⟨q⟩ (in words derived from Italian and Latin).

Vassalli's 1796 work contained several new letters to represent the sounds of the Maltese language, which included the invention of several ad-hoc letters as well as the importation of Cyrillic ge, che, sha, and ze. His alphabet is set out in full with modern-day equivalents where known:

A, a = a

B, b = b

T, t = t

D, d = d

E, e = e

F, f = f

[V, or a Syriac/Arabic gimel open to the right] = g

[Ч], ɥ = ċ

H, h = h

ȣ

Ө, ө

Y, y = j

Г = ġ

З, з

U = ħ

I, i = i

J, j = j

K, k = k

[I with a small c superimposed on it]

L, l = l

M, m = m

N, n = n

O, o = o

P, p = p

R, r = r

S, s = s

Ɯ, ɯ = x

V, v = v

U, u = u

W, w = w

Z, z = z

Ʒ, ʒ = ż

Æ, æ = final e

Five grave accented vowels are also used to indicate which syllable should be stressed: Àà, Èè, Ìì, Òò, and Ùù.
