= Mejju ġie bil-Ward u ż-Żahar =

Mejju ġie bil-Ward u ż-Żahar (English: May has arrived with Flowers and Blossoms) is a Maltese-language poem written by the seventeenth-century Maltese poet, physician and naturalist Ġan Franġisk Bonamico (1639–1680). Generally dated to around 1672, the poem is an important work in the early history of Maltese literature and is particularly notable for its celebration of spring and its praise of the Grand Master of the Order of St. John, Nicolas Cotoner.

The poem consists of sixteen verses and combines pastoral imagery with political praise. For many years, it was regarded as the oldest known literary poem written in Maltese, until the discovery of Il-Kantilena, attributed to Pietru Caxaro, in 1966.

== Manuscript and preservation ==
The original Maltese poem is preserved in a manuscript held at the National Library of Malta in Valletta. It appears in manuscript 144, entitled Nuova Scuola dell'Antica Lingua Punica Scoperta nel Moderno Parlare Maltese e Gozitano, compiled by the Gozitan scholar Ġan Franġisk Agius de Soldanis (1712–1770). The poem is found on folios 108–109. De Soldanis also preserved another version of the poem, written using his own proposed alphabet. His manuscript played an important role in ensuring the survival of Bonamico's literary work. The poem was first published in 1931 by N. Cremona. It has subsequently been reproduced and analysed by several Maltese literary scholars, including Arnold Cassola and Oliver Friggieri.

== Text ==
- Original orthography

Mejju gie' bl'Uard u Zahar
Adda l bart, e Sceta u 'l Beracq
heda e riech, seket el Bachar
Tar e schab men nuece e'Sema
Sa fl'e Gebiel neptet el chdura
Regeet t'ghanni col Aasfura
U' f el fercol cqalb t'ertema

E qaila ferh kien fe di Gesira
li ma Kiensce min i uuennesha
li ma Kiensce min i charisha
Kecu tepki el giuh phl lsira

Enti el ferh u 'l hena taana
Cotoner daul ta aineina
Tant li e Sema i challic chdeina
Fl'achar bart i colna e schana

- Modern Maltese orthography

Mejju ġie bil-ward u ż-żahar,
Għadda l-bard, ix-xita u l-beraq,
Tgħattiet l-art bin-nwar u l-weraq,
Heda r-riħ, síket il-baħar.

Tar is-sħab minn wiċċ is-Sema,
Sa fl-iġbiel nibtet il-ħdura,
Reġgħet tgħanni kull għasfura
U fil-ferħ kull qalb tirtema.

Qajla ferħ kien f’hedil-Gżira,
Li ma kienx min iwennisha,
Li ma kienx min iħarisha,
Kíeku tibki l-ġuħ bħal lsira.

Inti l-ferħ u l-hena tagħna,
Cotoner dawl ta’ għajnejna,
Tant li s-Sema jħallik ħdejna,
Fl-akbar bard ikollna s-sħana.
