= Emanuel Benjamin Vella =

Maltese schoolteacher and author

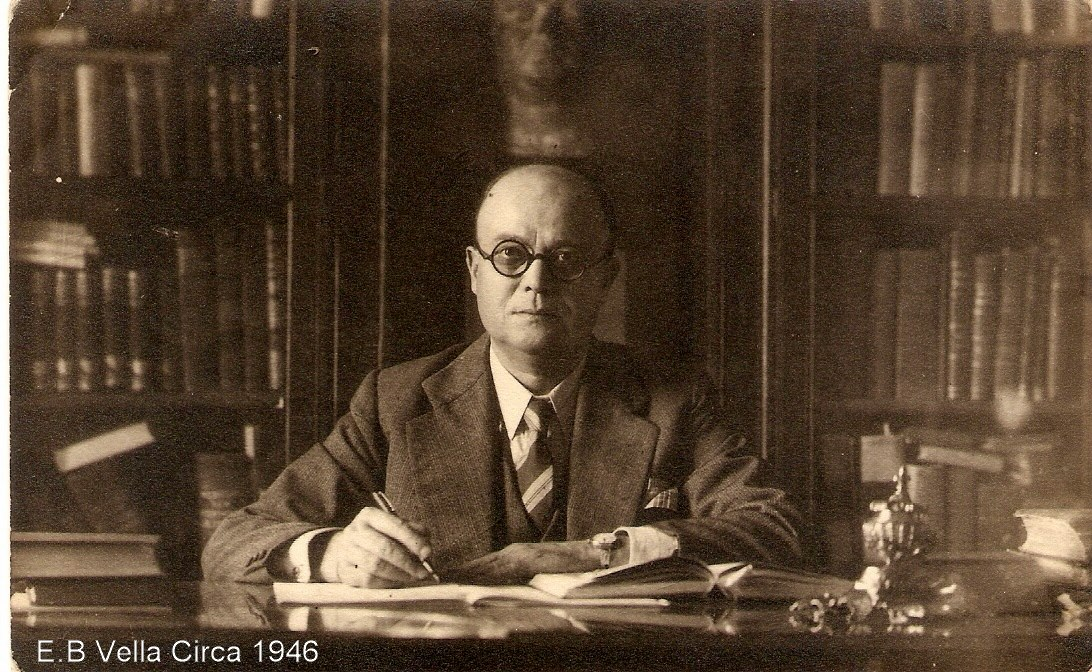
- Born: June 20, 1898; Mosta, Malta
- Died: May 2, 1946 (aged 47); Mosta, Malta
- Occupation: Educator

Emanuel Benjamin Vella, also known as E. B. Vella, was a Maltese schoolteacher and writer. He was born in Mosta on 20 June 1898 to Clement Vella and his wife Carmela née Azzopardi. He was a member of the Maltese Writers Association. He died in Mosta on 2 May 1946. A primary school in Mosta is named after him.

He was one of the youngest persons to have ever graduated as a teacher and he began his career at the Government Elementary School in Mosta. Together with his uncle Dun Gamri Azzopardi, a priest, he ran the first center for Christian doctrine outline by the recent Maltese Saint, Dun Gorg Preca. The centre was also located in Mosta. By the age of 23, after successfully completing studies at the College of St Mary in England, Emanuel became school Headmaster in Malta. He was the first Maltese teacher to have obtained a Board of Education Certificate, which allowed him a license to teach at any Elementary school throughout the British Empire. E.B. Vella excelled in foreign languages and he furthered his studies in Oriental Languages through the University of London.

When he returned to Malta as Headmaster, he was given the responsibility of several Elementary schools, including the schools in St. Paul's Bay, Zabbar, Vittoriosa and Tarxien. In fact, he spent some years living in Tarxien.

Vella was then appointed Inspector of Schools and he frequently had to supervise the curriculum and teaching methods used to teach the several subjects that were available to students, including the Maltese language.

Vella organised and ran a specialized training course in the Maltese language for school teachers. Additionally, he set up evening classes for adults and for civil servants who wanted to either learn Maltese or continue their education and language learning skills.

He was instrumental in the introduction of the Maltese language at the Lyceum. Moreover, Vella introduced and organized evening courses in the English language for Maltese persons who wanted to emigrate.

Vella was a Member of the Maltese Writers Association (which founded the Akkademja tal-Malti). He was also the author of several Maltese publications that remain a heritage of Melitensia Libraries. In the 1930s, with the collaboration of George Pisani. Vella published a series of children's reading books in the Maltese language to be used in primary grades in Maltese public (government funded) schools. The six books were a series called 'A Collection of Roses' (Gabra ta' Ward). They were printed in Great Britain by Headley Brothers, with some of the illustration designed by Robert Dingle, T.H.R. and G. Arcidcona. Vella included the works of Malta's first pioneers of the Maltese language, who had all contributed and worked so hard to ensure that Maltese became the official language of the Maltese Islands in 1934. The series was actively used in both public and private schools throughout Malta and Gozo until the late 1960s. Besides being a spokesperson and a major driver for the introduction of the teaching of the Maltese language in schools, Vella was also instrumental in introducing and monitoring the importance of the teaching of the English language too. He highlighted the fact that it should only be taught in the most proper and professional manner possible. Among his notable academic works are Gabra ta' Ward - Haz-Zabbar u l-Grajja Tieghu - Iz-Zejtun u Marsaxlokk - L-Istorja tal-Mosta bil-Knisja Taghha - L-Istorja ta' Hal Tarxien u Rahal Gdid - L-Istorja ta' Birkirkara bil-Kolleggjata Taghha - The Teaching of English in Our Primary Schools. The history and the story of the Maltese Islands was always very close to Vella's heart. He spent many years assisting Sir Themistocles Zammit with his various archaeological research, however always with a special focus on his own hometown, Mosta.

Vella also had a keen interest in the history of other villages in Malta and he wrote a number of books dedicated to particular Maltese villages. These publications included rare information that he obtained from research conducted by himself. Amongst the notable publications are:- The Story of Zabbar (1926), 'Zejtun and Marsaxlokk (1927), 'The History of Mosta and its Church (1930), 'The History of Tarxien and Paola (1932) and "The History of Birkirkara with its Collegiate (1934). Vella had also started writing 'The History of Mdina' but never succeeded in finishing it. During the Second World War, Vella and his family had temporarily relocated to the town of Rabat, in St Publius Street. He would enjoy frequenting the old Casino and would often stroll the silent streets of Mdina. After the war, he moved back to Mosta. Vella was also instrumental in the opening of another school in Fgura in 1944. Vella's short but notable life ended on the 2 May 1946 after a short illness, at his home in Mosta, next to Mosta church. Today, the house has become a wine bar/bistro called 'Barokk'. Vella was married to Priscilla (Precedes) Tomlin, the daughter of Henry John Tomlin and a mother of Italian/Sicilian descent. Vella and his wife had three children, Eustace Vella Tomlin, Reginald Vella Tomlin and Euphrosyne Vella Tomlin.

After the death of E.B. Vella, the National Poet Dun Karm Psaila dedicated a Sonnet where he described Vella as "Truly Maltese, Maltese at Heart, he loved the island, this tiny land where he was born". Celebrated local Poet, Ninu Cremona had written a special short poem in memory of Emanuel Benjamin Vella, as follows: ‘Kien bniedem dħuli li fil-wiċċ imfaqqa’ tiegħu, b’għajnejh li minn taħt il-lenti tan-nuċċali, meta jkellmek, b’dik it-tbissima ta’ fommu, kien donnu jaqralek moħħok, kien jurik li kien bniedem imsejjaħ biex jaħdem f’kull għalqa ġdida li biha l-moħħ tal-ġenerazzjoni l-ġdida jeħtieġlu jiżżejjen.’

There are several streets in Malta named after Vella, in Mosta, Tarxien, Birkirkara. The Primary School in Mosta is also named after him. A statue/bust of Vella is situated in the town of Mosta in his memory. E.B. Vella was Uncle, to the celebrated academic and historian Godfrey Wettinger. He was also Uncle to notable American historian Walter Francis Vella (1924-1980), son of Noah Vella, brother to Emanuel.

Reginald Vella Tomlin, the younger son of E.B. Vella, followed in his father's academic footsteps, becoming headmaster of schools and an author of several books and poetry in his own right. Amongst his publications were beautiful pieces of Maltese prose collected and published between the years of 1953 and 1957 entitled 'Collection of Prose for Children'. Reginald, like his father before him, died prematurely in 1968.

All of Vella's three children are deceased. His surviving grandchildren are:- Joseph R. Vincenti, John. B. Vincenti, Francesca Vincenti, Paul Vincenti, Catherine Vincenti, Stephen Vincenti, Victoria Vincenti, Christina Nicodeme, Barry Tomlin and Trevor Tomlin.

== Sources ==
- Grech, S. (2020). Emanuel Benjamin Vella: Profil u Kommemorazzjoni. Banda Santa Marija Mosta, [online] pp. 1–8. Available at: https://www.academia.edu/44362170/Emanuel_Benjamin_Vella_Profil_u_Kommemorazzjoni [Accessed 6 Mar. 2023].
- "L-Istorja taż-Żejtun u M'Xlokk – E B Vella | Wirt iż-Żejtun". Wirtizzejtun.com.
- Sammut, Edward. "A Handlist of Writings on Art in Malta" (PDF). Melitensiawth.com. Archived from the original on April 16, 2016.
- MIXJET IL-MALTI -Minn Caxaro sa Aquilina. (2022). Available at: https://malti.skola.edu.mt/wp-content/uploads/2022/03/Ktejjeb-ta-Taghrif-2022.pdf [Accessed 6 Mar. 2023].
- Vella, E. (n.d.). TISLIMA LIL EMMANUEL BENJAMIN VELLA. [online] Available at: https://www.um.edu.mt/library/oar/bitstream/123456789/75358/1/Tislima%20lil%20Emmanuel%20Benjamin%20Vella.pdf [Accessed 6 Mar. 2023].
- Camilleri, J.J. (2006). E.B. Vella : f’għeluq is-sittin sena anniversarju minn mewtu. www.um.edu.mt. [online] Available at: https://www.um.edu.mt/library/oar/handle/123456789/71308 [Accessed 6 Mar. 2023].
- Schembri, M. (2010). Emmanuel Benjamin Vella (1899-1946). www.um.edu.mt. [online] Available at: https://www.um.edu.mt/library/oar/handle/123456789/82955?mode=full [Accessed 6 Mar. 2023].
- Cassar, G. (2002). Monumenti fil-Mosta. www.um.edu.mt. [online] Available at: https://www.um.edu.mt/library/oar/handle/123456789/68650 [Accessed 6 Mar. 2023].
