= Confraternity of Good Christians =

Society of True Christians
- Confraternita dei Buoni Cristiani
- Founded: 1530
- Dissolved: 1545
- Type: Study and discussion group
- Purpose: Philosophical Religious
- Headquarters: Mdina
- Location: Malta
- Key people: Francesco Gesualdo, Andrea Axac

The Society of True Christians (c. 1530-1545), whose original name was Confraternita dei Buoni Cristiani, was a philosophy-religious study group in Malta which sought freedom of thought and action. It was made up of both clerical and lay persons, and its members were Maltese as well as foreign. Its area of specialisation in philosophy was chiefly ethics. It also gave considerable importance to biblical studies.

== Life of the Society ==
The society was basically a joint venture between two priests, one French, Francis, Franġisku, François, Fransesco or Francesco Gesualdo, and the other Maltese, Andrea Axac (or Axiak).

=== The Founders ===
Both priests had separate schools of their own. Gesualdo already had an up and running school at Birgu, in 1526 when Axac transferred his own school there from Mdina. Though other private schools were also present, theirs became quickly known for their somewhat unorthodox teachings. Gesualdo's and Axac's friendship might have begun during this time.

Axac did not stay long at Birgu, just a year or less. In 1527 he returned to Mdina where he continued teaching there for some twenty-five years (up till around 1533). It seems that his school, was quite popular. Gesualdo also moved his school to Mdina very shortly after Axac's relocation.

=== Proceedings ===
Around 1530, Gesualdo and Axac together began the Society of True Christians at Mdina. That was the year in which the Knights Hospitallers were entrusted with the Maltese islands. The society functioned uninterruptedly for some fifteen years under the guidance of the two priests.

The society was made up of many of the students or former students, and friends, of both Gesualdo and Axac. They met regularly to read and share the writings of Martin Luther, and also of some others, such as Melanchthon and Erasmus. These authors and all their writings were condemned by the Holy See, and as such were fanatically sought out by the Inquisition.

=== Beliefs ===
Inspired by the Reformation writers, the members of the society harboured an alternative view to the current model of the Catholic Church, to which they all belonged. Amongst other matters, they seem to have denied the divine foundation of the sacraments and their supernatural efficacy, the law of celibacy, the veneration of saints and of sacred images, indulgences, the existence of purgatory, and the primacy of the Roman pontiff (the pope).

Most members of the society were in possession of a copy of the New Testament in vernacular (which was prohibited by Catholic Church), which some had brought over from Sicily. Though it is not known which was the precise version they possessed, various editions could be found, notably those of Martin Luther, Jacques Lefèvre d'Étaples, the William Tyndale, and the Froschau Bible. This helped them to adhere to, and deepen, their own version of the philosophia Christi (the philosophy of Christ), about which they read in Erasmus’ writings.

The society thus believed in a religion which was not doctrinal, and had no theology, but was solely inspired from the spirituality and morality of the New Testament.

=== Termination ===
In 1545, the Inquisition caught up with Gesualdo and Axac, and accused them and their associates of heresy. They were all held prisoners at the Inquisitor's Palace at Birgu while their lengthy proceedings were ongoing. They were probably also tortured.

Eventually, the larger part of the society members were let off with an admonition. However, Gesualdo and another member, Petit, who were considered to be the most pernicious (perniciosissimus hæreticus). They both refused to reject their beliefs, and were thus condemned to be burned at the stake (uti pertinax et impœnitens ad ignem vivus damnatus). Their condemnation was publicly read at the church of St. Lawrence at Birgu on November 5, 1546. The execution was implemented immediately afterwards on that same day at the main square of Birgu. These were the first and, fortunately, the last execution of the sort ever performed in Malta.

However, other available records indicate that in fact it was only Petit who was executed, while Gesualdo (who could well have been a Knight Hospitaller himself) was still alive in 1550 in Malta where he faced another trial by a Council of the Knights Hospitallers and another one in 1555. In 1562 Gesualdo and his companion Axac faced a trial for heresy (Lutheranism) in Rome. Inquisition instructed Gesualdo to publicly recant his errors.

After the trial of Gesualdo and Petit’s killing, the society was disbanded forever.

== Known members ==
The following are certainly not the only members of the society. They are the ones whose names have been recorded in the records of the Inquisition since they were considered the most ‘dangerous’ of all. The students, for instance, of both Gesualdo and Axac were never formally accused of heresy, and thus their names, unfortunately, have been lost.

- Francesco Gesualdo (some sources claim was executed in 1546) – A French priest, possibly a Knight Hospitaller, considered by the Inquisition as the leader of the society. He ran a private school, mostly at Mdina, for over twenty years, mainly teaching humane lettere (human arts). He founded the Society of True Christians around 1530 together with Andrew Axac. In 1546, accused before the Maltese Inquisition, he was found guilty of heresy, deemed impenitent, and claimed to be burned at the stake. However, other records indicate that in 1550 Council of the Knights Hospitallers tried and sentenced him to two years incarcerated in the underground Gozo guva – counted among the punishments reserved for serious crimes (implying at the same time that he could not have died in 1546). It must have been an offence related to some breach of the vow of chastity, in which woman named Grima featured as Gesualdo's victim or as accomplice. The records mention that the errant knight, bound by celibacy, had to compensate Grima to the tune of 25 scudi promised to her in marriage.

On November 5, 1555, the Council of Knights Hospitallers met again to hear the complaint of the Order’s criminal prosecutor, requesting the Council to start proceedings against Fra Francesco Gesualdo. He was now being investigated for serious heresy and had been placed in prison while justice was taking its course. Later, because of illness and as recommended by physicians, he was moved from jail and placed in the Infirmary which was to serve as his prison during his convalescence. But Gesualdo, without permission from the Grand Master, fled from the hospital and disappeared from the island of Malta.

After hearing the report of the Commissioners and mature deliberation, the Council, as was customary, resolved to convene the public assembly of the knights to proceed to expel Gesualdo from the Knights Hospitallers.

On 10 March 1562 Gesualdo appeared before Inquisition Tribunal in Rome again to be examined if he walks in the light or in darkness and was sentenced to do penance. Gesualdo abjured on 8 May 1562, was rehabilitated and even allowed to celebrate mass. What happened to him afterwards is unknown, possibly he could have traveled to Geneva which was an escape route for persecuted Maltese Protestants.

- Andrew Axac – A Maltese priest from Rabat, Malta. Unfortunately, his dates of birth and death are not known yet. It seems probable that he studied abroad, perhaps Sicily or Naples, since he was well acquainted with the philosophy of the humanists. He had a private school, majorly at Mdina, before 1525 where he taught humane lettere (human arts). He founded the Society of True Christians around 1530 together with Francesco Gesualdo. After a trial in 1546, when Petit was burned at the stake for heresy, and Axac left off with just an admonition, Axac continued with his former beliefs. In fact, in defiance to the law of celibacy, around 1550, he lived with a concubine. Before that, however, in 1553, he was entrusted with the school of the bishop’s cathedral at Mdina. In 1560, however, the Inquisition sent him to Rome, Italy, to face charges of heresy. He was interrogated at length and perhaps also tortured. He signed an abjuration on March 10, 1561, and awarded ‘spiritual’ punishments (like for 7 years on Wednesdays and Saturdays to fast and recite prayers). His whereabouts after this are not known. He probably died abroad although witness accounts exist which claim that in 1574 Axac was seen teaching in his Mdina school (even though it was prohibited by the Inquisition).
- Thomaso Petit (died 1546) – Little is known of the man, possibly of French origin. At some time, he seems to have joined the Society of True Christians, for when in 1545, formal accusations were brought before the Inquisition against its members, Petit was considered to be one of the most staunch. Sources remark that in fact he wanted to die a martyr's death. He was thus found guilty and, together with Francesco Gesualdo, was condemned on November 5, 1546, and burned at the stake in Birgu’s main square.
- Matthew Falzun Sr. (d. c. 1574) – He was a member of the popular council of Mdina intermittently between 1534 and 1570. In 1546 he was accused before the Inquisition together with its other members of the Society of True Christians, and at first was released. Then, however, he was accused once more and sentenced to keep Malta as his prison. He was very much esteemed by his contemporaries. Years later, in 1574, he was again arrested by the Inquisition, probably as part of some corrupt practices on the part of the inquisitor, for there were on charges of heresy against him. Eventually, he was spirited away to Sicily, killed, and had his body burnt. All his considerable property in Malta was appropriated by the Inquisition, and this might have been the motive of his arrest and assassination. Since it was spread about that Falzun had, by some pact with the devil, mysteriously vanished from the Inquisition’s dungeons in Malta, it was rumoured that he was a witch (sahhar). Nevertheless, his effigy was put on public trial, sentenced to death, and burned at the stake in Birgu’s main square.
- Matthew Falzun Jr. – Son of Matthew Falzun Sr., whose fate he would have shared to the end if he had not escaped to Sicily immediately upon the arrest of his father by the Inquisition in 1574. Since the main intent of this arrest was the appropriation of his father’s property, as his principal inheritor he was likewise in mortal danger. In his absence, the Inquisition in Malta accused him of heresy just the same, brought his effigy to an open trial, passed sentence, and burned his effigy in Birgu’s main square. Falzun Jr. was never apprehended, and his whereabouts after his escape to Sicily remain known.
- Lawrence Falzun – The nephew of Matthew Falzun Sr., and the cousin of Matthew Falzun Jr. He would have shared the same fate of his uncle if he had not escaped to France immediately upon the arrest of his uncle and cousin by the Inquisition in 1574. Since the main intent of this arrest was the appropriation of his father’s property, as the next inheritor after his cousin he was likewise in mortal danger. In his absence, the Inquisition in Malta accused him of heresy just the same, brought his effigy to an open trial, passed sentence, and burned his effigy in Birgu’s main square. Falzun was never apprehended, and his whereabouts after his escape to France remain known.
- Peter Stunica– Little is known about his personal life. In 1546, he was brought before the Inquisition as a member of the Society of True Christians, and accused of heresy. He was sentenced to a fine and some temporary ‘spiritual’ punishments. Nothing else is known of his whereabouts after that.
- Brandan Caxaro (c. 1508-1565) – A Maltese priest from Mdina, today he is better known as the transcriber of Peter Caxaro’s famous Il-Kantilena. He studied abroad, probably at Naples or Palermo. In 1531 he was already ordained a priest. He worked as a notary, and it is in one of his tomes that he transcribed his relative’s Il-Kantilena around 1535. In 1546, he was brought before the Inquisition as a member of the Society of True Christians accused of heresy. However, he pleaded guilty, declared himself penitent, demanded forgiveness, and was forgiven. Nevertheless, privately Caxaro did not give up his former beliefs. In fact, around 1550 he took a wife, Katarina Azopardo, without applying for dispensation from the pope. They had five children. In 1563, he was brought before the Inquisition again, and sentenced to be indefinitely imprisoned at the dungeons of the place of the Inquisition at Birgu together with a host of other punishments, both spiritual and temporal. Caxaro submitted, and just a year later, in 1564, was allowed to work as a notary once more. Gradually, he was pardoned of the other punishments. Nevertheless, Caxaro was not to enjoy his new-found honour, for he died just two weeks after the end of the Great Siege of Malta of 1565, on September 22.
- Peter Cumbo – Nothing is known about his personal life except that in 1546 he was brought before the Inquisition as a member of the Society of True Christians, and accused of heresy. He was sentenced to a fine and some temporary ‘spiritual’ punishments. Nothing else is known of his whereabouts after that.

== Works ==
Up till now no work is known to have survived by the society or by any of its members. Since the members were all submitted to the scrutiny of the Inquisition, the likelihood of any of their writings surviving is next to nil. However, neither is it impossible.

== Appreciation ==
The Society of True Christians must be appreciated against the social, political, religious and historical background of its time. Considering all of this, what Gesualdo and Axac did was certainly outstanding and amazing. The whole group was truly exceptional. It was not only up to date in terms of knowledge (considering the limitations of the time) but also philosophically engaging and interesting. Its members must be also considered to be very courageous people.

The period of their operation was indeed bleak. Nevertheless, these people dared to entertain a new philosophy and dream a new world-view. Their ruthless destruction only goes on to prove how extraordinary their endeavour was.

The main source of information about the society is practically only that of the annals of the Inquisition. This not only means that the records are extremely difficult to research (if not by a thorough expert in the field) but also taken with a pinch of salt, since the objective of the archives is not to show its victims favourably or in their true light but, on the contrary, to heap upon them shame and dishonour.

Though the members of the society had the New Testament as their basic text, this is certainly not the only reading they did. They were thoroughly familiar with the Greek and Latin classics, with major Christian philosophers, and with the new readings of people like Melanchthon and Erasmus, amongst others. Their ultimate objective was, it seems, to develop a kind of ethical philosophy which was innovative and refreshing, leaving behind them the thought categories of old and discovering a philosophy which was at once more authentic and sensible.

== See also ==
Philosophy in Malta

== Bibliography ==
- Montebello, Mark (2001). Il-Ktieb tal-Filosofija f'Malta (A Source Book of Philosophy in Malta); vol 1. PIN Publications.
- Montebello, Mark (2001a). Il-Ktieb tal-Filosofija f'Malta (A Source Book of Philosophy in Malta); vol 2. PIN Publications.
- Vella, Andrew (1993). Storja ta' Malta (A History of Malta), vol. I. Klabb Kotba Maltin.
