= Reginald Vella Tomlin =

Maltese educator, author, and headmaster (d. 1968)

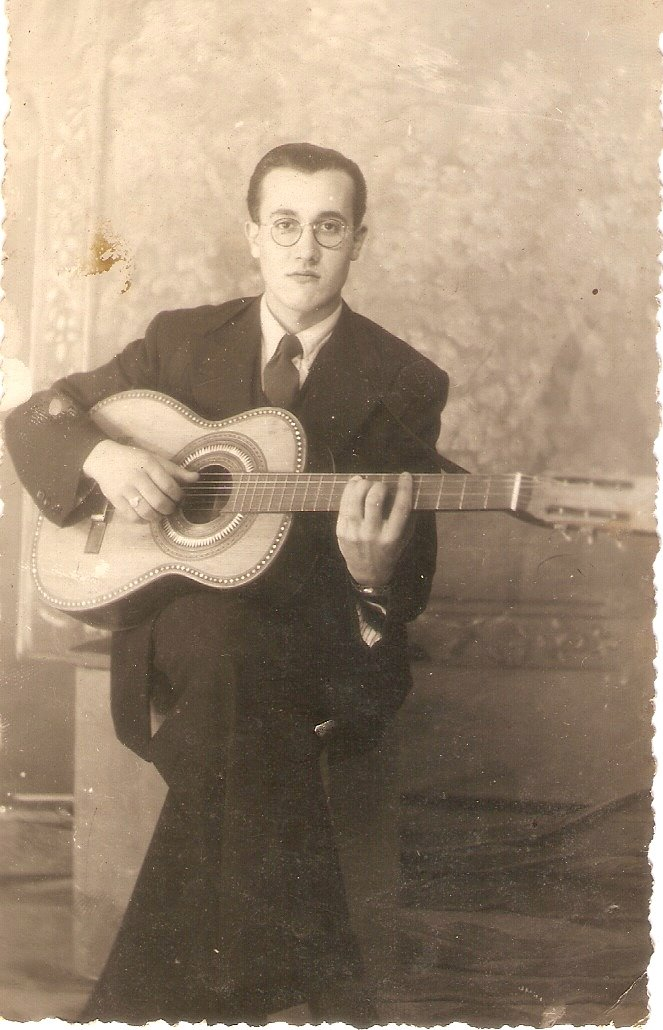
- Reginald Vella Tomlin
- Born: Malta
- Died: 1968
- Known for: Academic
- Children: 3
- Parent(s): E.B. Vella and Precedes Tomlin

Academic work
- Discipline: Maltese language

Reginald Vella Tomlin was born in Malta to E.B. Vella (Emanuel Benjamin Vella) and Precedes (aka Priscilla) Tomlin.

Being educated in the Arts & Sciences, Reginald followed in his father's footsteps to become an academic focusing on bringing to the forefront the importance of the Maltese language in Schools as well as two other subjects that were on his list of priorities - English & History. He was a great lover of music and prose. As a child, he formed part of a lively Trio, made up of his two siblings Euphrosyne on piano and Eustace on violin, while he played the cello. He was also a talented guitarist. His mother, of British/Italian/Sicilian birth was a proficient pianoforte musician. Freesia had graduated as a teacher herself and went on to have a large family. She encouraged her children to excel in the arts & languages. .

Reginald followed in his fathers footsteps and became an author. He wrote books and papers for Maltese Libraries and also for the local Education system. On 15 September 1948, Reginald Vella Tomlin also became the Head of School at the Boys Primary School in Birżebbuġa. With his direction, a school publication known as The Hawk was started on 9 April 1953 and he also composed the school's first anthem, Innu ghat-Tfal ta’ Birzebbuga. Throughout his term as Headmaster, he became a mentor for many aspiring students, who themselves went on to become well known writers and journalists in the Maltese Islands. Reginald died in 1968. Reginald Vella Tomlin was first cousin (through his aunt Esther Tomlin married to Wettinger) to yet another notable and renowned scholar and historian, Godfrey Wettinger. Reginald is survived by his sons, Graham, Barry and Trevor Vella Tomlin and their respective children.

== Publications ==
Amongst the several important publications and papers that Reginald Vella Tomlin produced are:-

- A collection of three children's prose books (1953 and 1957) l-Ġabra ta’ Proża għat-Tfal
- GLIMPSES OF NATURAL SCIENCE in An Eighteenth Century Manuscript'
- A poem called M'hemmex Serhan (1956)
- Qtar il-Qalb (1954)

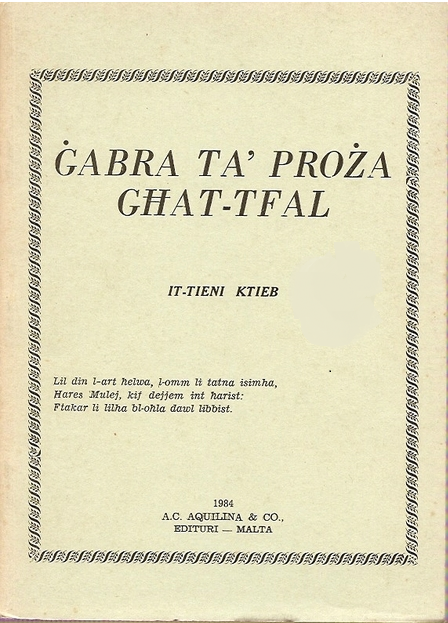
Rvt

== Sources ==
- "How I Write - Alfred Massa - The Malta Independent". independent.com.mt.
- Melita historica : Journal of the Malta Historical Society. 3(1960)1(5-52)
- "L-Istorja tiegħu | L-Akkademja tal-Malti". akkademjatalmalti.org.
- "Education in Birżebbuġa – Birzebbuga Symphonic Band A.D. 1990, Malta". birzebbugaband.wordpress.com.
