= Notarial Archives =

Notarial archive in Valletta, Malta

- L-Arkivji Nutarili
- Interactive map of Notarial Archives
- 35°53′53.7″N 14°30′30.2″E; 35°53′54.0″N 14°30′57.6″E
- Location: Valletta, Malta
- Established: 10 July 1640
- Collection size: 20,000 volumes
- Website: Office of the Notary to Government and Notarial Archives

The Notarial Archives (Maltese: L-Arkivji Nutarili) is an archive in Valletta, Malta, that contains about 20,000 volumes of contracts, wills and other legal documents from the 15th century to the present day. Its collections are significant both from a legal and historical point of view, and they include Il-Kantilena, the earliest known text in the Maltese language. The Notarial Archives fall within the remit of the Office of the Notary to Government, within the Ministry for Justice, of Malta.

The archives suffered significant damage during World War II when part of the collection was destroyed due to aerial bombardment, and in later decades where the documents suffered slow degradation due to neglect. Since the 2010s, efforts have been made to preserve and digitise the archives, and as of 2019 there is an ongoing project to convert its premises into a conservation hub.

== History ==
The Notarial Archives were established by Grand Master Giovanni Paolo Lascaris through an instrument dated 10 July 1640. This document was registered in the Acts of the Order, and it is now found at the National Library of Malta. The establishment of the archives was promoted by the historian Giovanni Francesco Abela. The first archivist was Salvatore Ciantar.

The archives suffered severe damage during World War II. In April 1942, the building they were housed in received two direct hits from aerial bombardment, and about 2,000 volumes were destroyed or damaged. Some documents were stored in the basement of Auberge d'Italie, where many were also damaged. In December 1945, the archives were moved to their present location at 24, St Christopher Street, and in 1968 the original acts were moved to a property in Mikiel Anton Vassalli Street while the copies were retained at St Christopher Street.

Today, the archives are administered by a government department known as the Office of the Notary to Government and Notarial Archives, which is led by the Chief Notary to Government. By the early 21st century, they were in a dilapidated state and the collections were suffering from significant degradation. In 2008, some damaged documents which dated back to the 15th century were collected by a handyman and placed in garbage bags to be disposed of, but they were not thrown away and were rediscovered later. Since then, significant efforts have been made to preserve and digitise the archives' collection.

== Facilities ==
The Notarial Archives are housed within two buildings in Valletta. The main building houses original documents, and it is located in 2/3, Mikiel Anton Vassalli Street. This building is also the office of the Chief Notary to Government. Notaries are required by law to hand in original wills and deeds to this archive each year. Sometimes this was not properly enforced resulting in a backlog of documents, but since 2012 efforts have been made to ensure that all notarial documents are submitted to the archives.

The secondary facility is located within two adjacent buildings at 24, St Christopher Street and 217, St Paul's Street. The property in St Christopher Street is a palazzo which was built in the 18th century. This facility houses copies of the original documents, and notaries are not obliged to submit true copies of documents to this archive since they are allowed to keep them themselves. As of 2019, this building is being rehabilitated.

Some notarial records from Gozo which were stored at the Ministry for Gozo before being relocated to the Gozo Section of the National Archives of Malta in February 2016 and April 2017 are administered jointly by the National Archives and the Notarial Archives.

== Collection ==
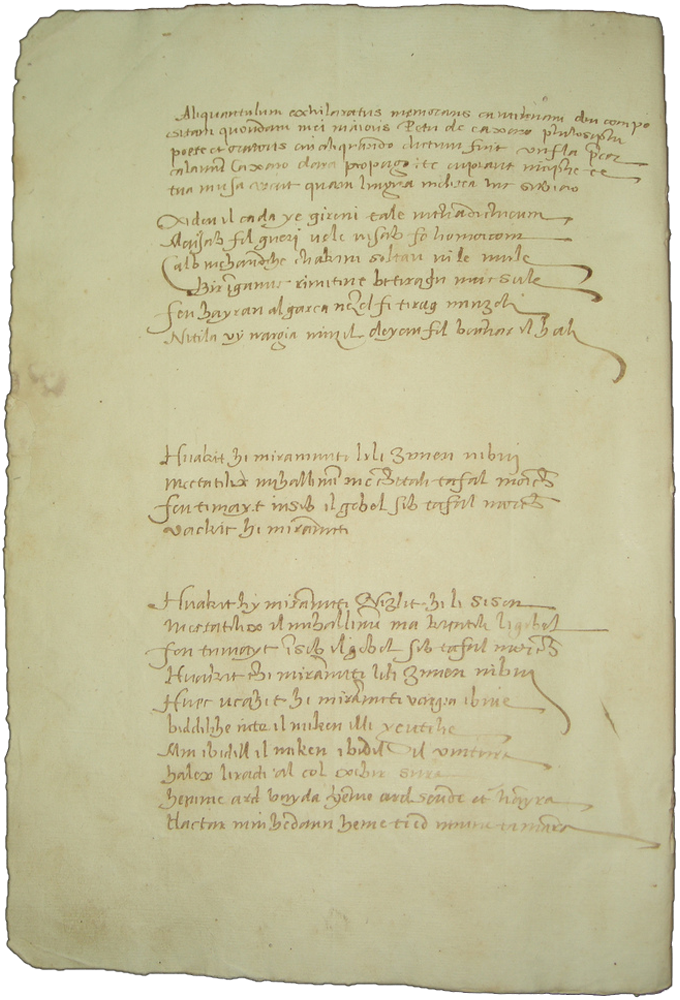
Il-Kantilena, the oldest known text in the Maltese language, which is preserved at the Notarial Archives

The Notarial Archives contain over 20,000 registers which contain notarial records and other historic documents. The volumes in the archive contain at least 90 million pages, and they take up approximately 15 kilometres (9.3 mi) of shelving. The oldest documents in the Notarial Archives date back to the 15th century. Early records include a copy of a 1431 will which is the oldest known surviving document relating to Gozo. The earliest volume of deeds dates back to between 1465 and 1521, and it belonged to the notary Paolo Bonello.

The oldest known text in the Maltese language, a 15th-century poem called Il-Kantilena by Pietru Caxaro, is preserved at the Notarial Archives. It was discovered by Godfrey Wettinger and Mikiel Fsadni in 1966 in the notarial register of Brandano Caxaro, the poet's nephew, which dated from 1533 to 1536.

Other notable documents held at the Notarial Archives include a number of 15th and 16th century documents relating to Gozo before the raid of 1551 in which the island's records were destroyed, an eyewitness account of the Great Siege of Malta of 1565, contracts relating to the distribution of land from when Valletta was being built in the 16th century and contracts relating to the purchase of slaves. Later documents held by the archives include an 1861 letter franked with the first printing of Malta's first stamp, the Halfpenny Yellow.

== Research ==
The archives are important for both legal and historical research. Since the records held in the archives are legal documents, they are useful to determine or trace property ownership, inheritance, rights and duties and other legal implications. People requesting to inspect or make a copy of documents need to supply certain information such as the nature of the deed, the date and the notary involved. Services provided by the archives are subject to the following fees: inspection of a notarial act costs €0.60, and making copies costs €0.70 per page for informal photocopies and €1.20 per page for legal photocopies.

The archives are also used for historical research since they are a primary source about life in Malta from the 15th century to the present day, and they tell the country's history from the perspectives of its people from all classes of society. These documents contain details about daily life in Malta which are otherwise unknown, and they are also a source for genealogical research. Most of the documents in the archive have never been researched. People conducting historical research from the archives are required to submit an application which needs to be approved by the minister. Once researchers obtain this approval, fees to inspect notarial acts are waived and fees to make copies of documents are reduced to €0.10 per page.

The archives are open on weekdays throughout the year.

== Preservation and digitisation ==
Following many years of neglect, efforts are currently being made to preserve and digitise the Notarial Archives' collection. The Notarial Archives Resource Council was set up by Joan Abela as a voluntary non-profit NGO aimed at supporting the Chief Notary to Government in maintaining the Notarial Archives. In 2010, an agreement was signed between the Malta Study Center of the Hill Museum & Manuscript Library (HMML) which led to the digitisation of some 16th century notarial volumes, some of which are now available online on the HMML website. A project to catalogue early 19th century acts of British notaries in Malta began in 2013. During the same year, three sponsorship schemes for the archives were set up, entitled Adopt an Item, Adopt a Volume and Adopt a Notary, so as to help restore some of the archives' documents. Sponsors pay to conserve a particular item or volume, or the entire group of documents relating to a particular notary.

In August 2013, Prime Minister Joseph Muscat, finance minister Edward Scicluna and parliamentary secretary for justice Owen Bonnici visited the archives, and Abela described it as "mother of all archives" but said that its collections' poor state made it "Malta's national monument of shame". Abela took a leading role in safeguarding the archives, along with a team of professionals and volunteers. The Notarial Archives Foundation was also set up in order to safeguard the archives and create awareness about their existence. The Notarial Archives began various collaborations with the University of Malta, including a project with the Department of Artificial Intelligence which led to the establishment of a research tool known as NotaryPedia in 2018.

In mid-2018, a rehabilitation project of the archives' premises at St Christopher Street began. The project aims to convert it into a conservation hub, which would include a laboratory and a research centre, lecture and conference rooms, a small museum and visitor centre. Apart from the restoration of the building, the project also involves the disinfestation and conservation of the archives' collections. This project is being funded by the European Union at a cost of €5 million, and it is ongoing as of 2019.

In 2018, art exhibitions relating to the archives were held in order to create awareness and promote conservation. The exhibition Artists as Archivists was held between 3 and 6 October at the archives' premises at St Christopher Street, and it included works by seven artists. The exhibition Parallel Existences was held between 5 October and 3 November, exhibiting photographs by Alex Attard of fragments of documents from the Notarial Archives which had become deformed into sculpture-like forms over time.

As of 2019, the Notarial Archives is undertaking a process of digitising its collection so as to protect the information contained within its collection from potential damage or destruction. A list of notaries whose wills and inter vivos are found in the Notarial Archives is available on the archives' website.
