= Mikiel Fsadni =

Mikiel Fsadni (15 April 1916 – 18 April 2013) was a Maltese Dominican friar and historian. He is best known for the discovery of Il-Kantilena, the oldest known text in the Maltese language.

== Biography ==
Fsadni was the son of Joseph Fsadni and Giovanna née Cassano, and he was born in Birgu on 15 April 1916. He studied at the Dockyard School, and he began his novitiate to join the Dominican Order at the Dominican convent in Rabat in 1933. He made his first profession on 21 October 1934, and he studied philosophy and theology at the St Thomas Aquinas College in Rabat before being ordained a priest on 11 June 1939.

During World War II, he was at the Dominican convent in Birgu when it was partially destroyed in January 1941 by aerial bombardment aimed at the British aircraft carrier HMS Illustrious which was in the nearby harbour. Fsadni and the other Dominican friars subsequently moved to the Rabat convent and to a house in Birkirkara before returning to Birgu and staying within the Inquisitor's Palace. After the war, Fsadni was assigned to the Santa Marija tal-Għar convent in Rabat, where he remained for the rest of his life.

Fsadni was also a historian and writer, and he was particularly interested in the history of the Dominicans in Malta. He published several monographs about the Dominicans, and he also wrote about Maltese vernacular stone huts known as giren. He was also interested in photography.

In 1966, while doing some research about Dominican friars at the Notarial Archives, he and Godfrey Wettinger (who was researching about slavery) discovered a 15th-century poem known as Il-Kantilena, which turned out to be the oldest known surviving text in Maltese. Fsadni and Wettinger subsequently collaborated on studying the text, its author Pietru Caxaro and its copyist Brandano Caxaro.

In 1975, Fsadni was awarded the Rothmans Prize for Literature, and in 1990 his publication on giren won him a gold medal at the government's literary prizes. He also won a photography competition in 1988. He was awarded Ġieħ il-Birgu on 7 September 2000, and on 13 December 2008 he received the title of Member of the National Order of Merit.

He died on 18 April 2013, three days after his 97th birthday, at the Villa Messina care home in Rabat. At the time of his death, he was the oldest member of the Dominican Order in Malta.
