= Mark Montebello =

Maltese philosopher and author (born 1964)

Mark Montebello OP
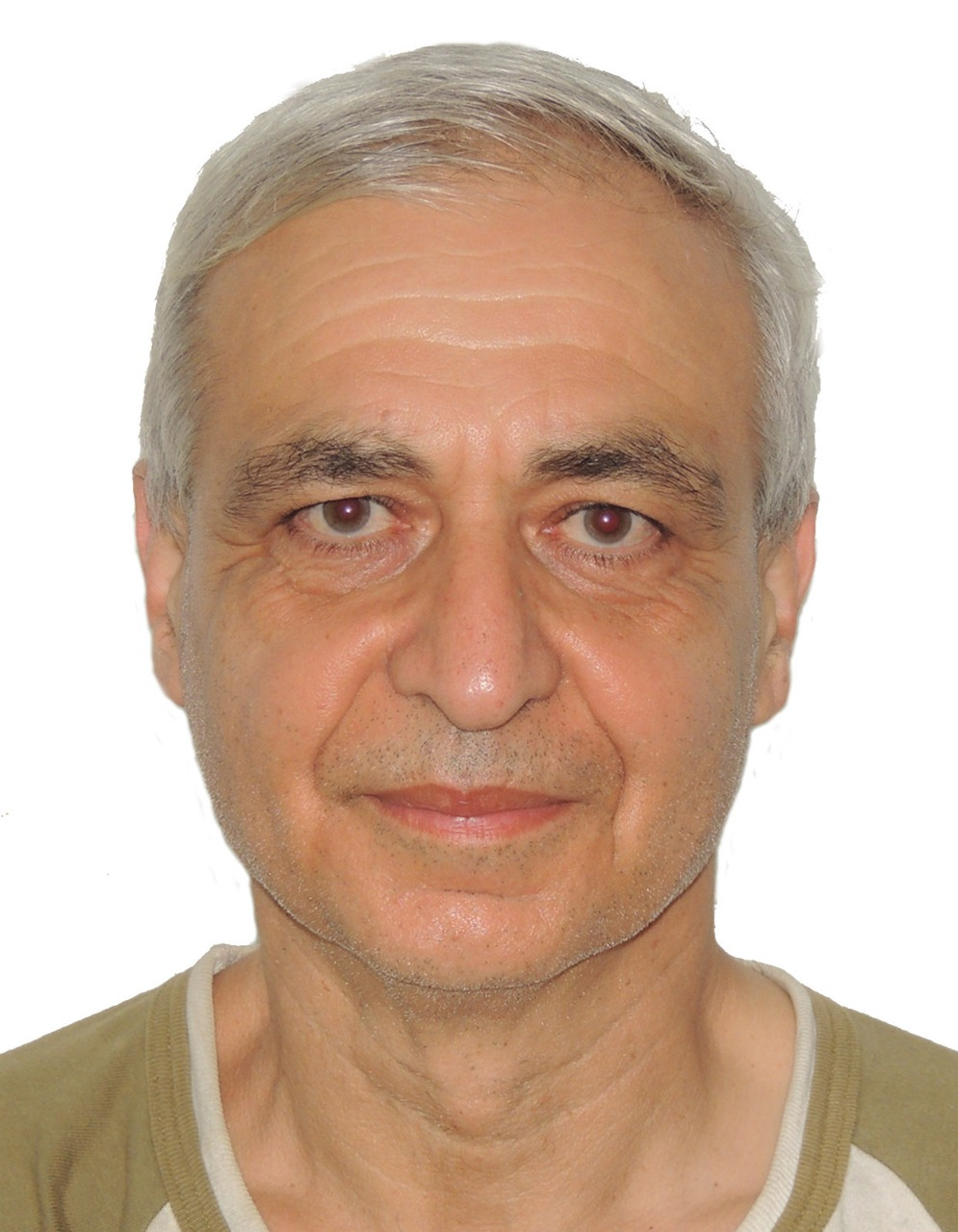
- Born: February 7, 1964; Mtarfa, Malta
- Education: University of Malta, Malta; Angelicum, Rome; Complutense, Madrid; University of Leicester, England
- Occupations: Philosophy, Criminal Justice

Mark Montebello (Mtarfa, Malta, 7 February 1964) is a Maltese priest, philosopher and author. He is mostly known for his controversies with Catholic Church authorities but also for his biographies of Manuel Dimech and Dom Mintoff.

== Private life ==
Montebello, the son of Joseph, a RAF corporal, and Lucrezia (k.a. Grace) née Sultana, a primary school teacher, both from Sliema, was born in Malta at the Mtarfa military hospital, the third of four siblings, and grew up at Sliema.

Montebello took his primary education at St. Francis School, Msida (1968–75), his secondary at St. Albert the Great College, Valletta (1975–80), and his higher education at St. Aloysius College, Birkirkara (1980–82). Montebello joined the Dominican Order at Rabat, Malta, in 1980, in which he made his religious profession in 1983. He was ordained a priest in 1989.

== Controversies ==
There were bans periodically issued by the local Catholic authorities silencing Montebello from speaking publicly for specific periods of time ranging from a few months to as long as three years.This contributed to make Montebello since 1992 a well-known controversial personality, expressing unusual thinking for a Catholic priest in the Maltese Islands .

The first ban came in 1992. Following a talk show on radio Live FM, Montebello was temporarily barred by the local archbishop Joseph Mercieca from speaking publicly for a year about the Catholic Church, faith or morals. This repeated itself in 2005 following an article in the Church-run weekly Il-Ġens, in which Montebello called the papal election of Joseph Ratzinger “a bad joke”.

In 2009, mainly following an article in the left-wing It-Torċa submitting that Jesus accepted divorce, the archbishop Paul Cremona banned Montebello from speaking publicly for a year. Due to this and other issues which precipitated the ban, Montebello was recalled to Rome by the Master General of the Dominican Order, Carlos Azpiroz Costa. As a result, Montebello was distanced from the Maltese Islands for three months at Mexico, serving with bishop José Raúl Vera López.

In 2011, ahead of the referendum on divorce held in the Maltese Islands, Montebello harshly criticised the Church's campaign and actions.

In 2015 Montebello was again chastised, this time by the archbishop Charles Scicluna, when he blessed the engagement of a gay male couple. On this occasion it was his congregation which banned him from speaking publicly for three years and also threatened to defrock him. Years later, in October 2023, in a response to “doubts” addressed to him by five of his cardinals, and later in the declaration "Fiducia supplicans" of December 2023, Pope Francis himself seems to have vindicated Montebello’s actions by acknowledging such blessings as long as they are not confused with sacramental blessings.

== Studies and publications ==
Montebello studied theology (1985–89) and philosophy (1983-85) in Malta. He specialised in philosophy in Rome (1989–93) and Madrid (1994-95), acquiring degrees in Plato and Aristotle, and studied criminal justice with Leicester University (2003–04). He began lecturing in ancient and medieval philosophy at the University of Malta and other higher academic institutions in 1991.

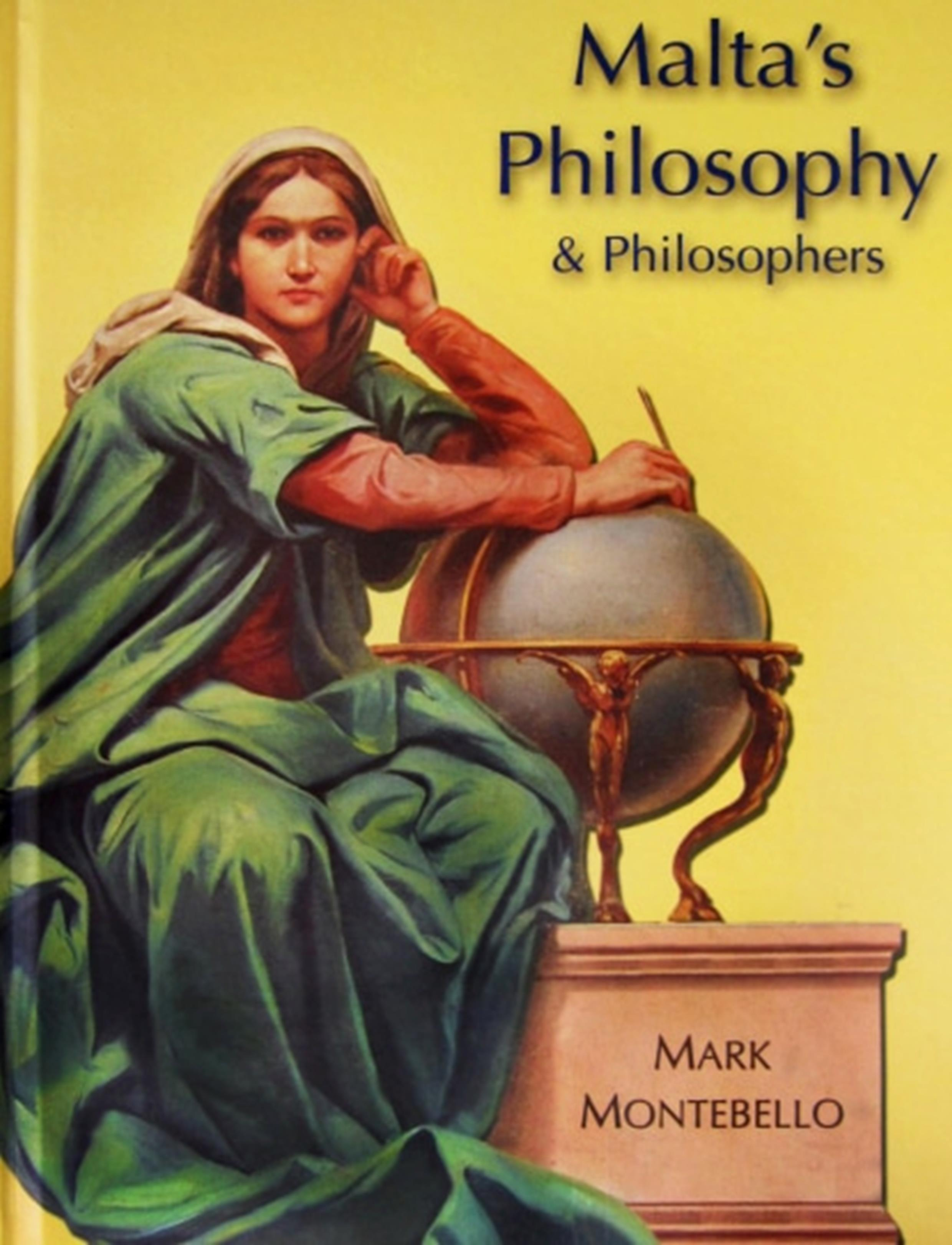
Montebello's publication of 2011

In 1993 Montebello began researching the philosophical tradition of the Maltese people, a relatively new area of systematic study, continuing in his investigations of prime sources both locally and abroad for more than twenty-five years. He published his findings in such books as Stedina għall-Filosofija Maltija (An Invitation to Maltese Philosophy, 1995), Il-Ktieb tal-Filosofija f’Malta (The Book of Philosophy in Malta, 2 volumes, 2001), 20th Century Philosophy in Malta (2009) and Malta’s Philosophy & Philosophers (2011). Monographs in this line included Daniel Callus: Historian & Philosopher (1994) and Angelo Pirotta: A Maltese philosopher of the first water (2006).

Other focused critiques include the study of the 15th-century Maltese poet and philosopher Peter Caxaro, publishing books such as Pietru Caxaru u l-Kantilena tieghu (Peter Caxaro and his Cantilena, 1992; second edition, 2015) and Bejn ix-Xieraq u l-Għelt: L-istruttura kjażtika tal-Kantilena (Between Rectitude and Incongruity: The chiastic structure of the Cantilena, 2016).

In his studies Montebello also thoroughly explored the life and personality of Malta's early-20th-century social reformer Manuel Dimech. His related publications include Dimech (2004; second edition in two volumes, 2013, 2018), Jien, Manwel Dimech (I, Manuel Dimech, 2006; second edition, 2017), Manwel Dimech: Fi kliemi (Manuel Dimech: In my own words, 2010), Manwel Dimech: Ivan u Praskovja u Kitbiet Oħra (Manuel Dimech: Ivan and Praskovia and other writings, 2011), Aphorisms: Wisdom of a philosopher in exile (with Francis Galea, 2012), Manwel Dimech: Ilbieraħ–Illum–għada (Manuel Dimech: Yesterday–today–tomorrow, 2013) and The Amazing Story of Manuel Dimech (2014).

Montebello's philosophical publications mostly explore the individual's relation to institutions. They include Il-Verità Teħlisna (The Truth Shall Set You Free, 1993), De Missione Christianorum (The Mission of the Christian, 1994), Il-Bejjiegħ ta’ l-Inċens u ċ-Ċnieser (The Incense and Incensory Vendor, 1994), Taqtigħ f’Salib it-Toroq (Struggle at the Crossroads, 1995), A Philosophy of Madness (1998), Il-Fidwa tal-Anarkiżmu (The Redemption of Anarchism, 2010; eBook, 2014), Four Havens of Intimacy (2012) and Il-Faqar tal-Paternaliżmu (The Poverty of Paternalism, 2017).

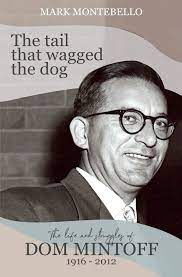
The Tail That Wagged The Dog: The life and struggles of Dom Mintoff (1916-2012) (2021)

In 2021 Montebello published the first fully-researched biography of Malta’s 20th-century four-time maverick prime minister Dom Mintoff, The Tail That Wagged The Dog: The life and struggles of Dom Mintoff (1916-2012). The book was commissioned and issued by SKS Publications, a branch of Malta’s Labour Party. Though at first welcomed by Prime Minister Robert Abela, the leader of the party, he later repudiated the biography, though the book was not withheld from being sold by the publisher. The vacillation was mainly due to Mintoff’s children disassociating themselves from the publication. Montebello firmly stood by his work. Seven years in the making, the 640-page book was nonetheless positively hailed by critics, and even shortlisted for the national book prize.

== Endeavours ==
In 1995, together with others Montebello began a community centre in Cospicua run by the humanitarian NGO Daritama (house of hope) for the entire harbour district of Cottonera. The centre included a community school, a community radio (Radju Kottoner 98FM), a self-help group for prisoners and their families (Mid-Dlam għad-Dawl) and a support group for prisoners of crime (Victim Support Malta). The NGO was terminated in 2010, allowing Mid-Dlam għad-Dawl and Victim Support Malta to ensue independently.

In his varied humanitarian endeavours, not lacking notable controversy was Montebello’s work with and on behalf of the prisoners of the Corradino Correctional Facility at Paola. In this line of work within the criminal justice ambit Montebello’s publications include L-Iskutella ta’ l-Abbandunati (The Basin of the Forsaken, 2000), Daphne (2003), Jean-Joseph Lataste: Apostle of Prisons (2006), The Right to Information of Victims of Crime in Malta (2006), Making Malta Saver for International Visitors (2007) and The Resettlement of Maltese Prisoners (2008).

In 2012, along with other often unconventional intellectuals, Montebello established the foundation Philosophy Sharing for public discussion and tutoring.

Throughout his public career Montebello regularly contributed to local weeklies, especially to It-Torċa (1993-2021) and media outlets. Other books by Montebello include Pietà-Gwardamanga: Il-Baħar–Il-Ħniena–Is-Sliem (Pietà-Gwardamanga: The Sea–Mercy–Tranquillity, 2008) and Min Qatel il-Patri? Ġrajja storika (Who Murdered the Friar? A historical account, with Marlene Mifsud Chircop, 2016).

Montebello has also been a missionary in Ethiopia (2008) and Peru (ongoing since 2021).

On 23 October 2026, he was awarded (in absentia) by the President of Malta, Myriam Spiteri Debono, on behalf of the Cottonera Foundation, “Ġieħ il-Kottonera” (the Cottonera Honour) in recognition of his social, educational and humanitarian work in the Cottonera District..

== See also ==
- Philosophy in Malta
