= Francesco Gesualdo =

Francesco Gesualdo (French: François Gesuald, Maltese: Franġisku Ġiżwaldu), was a French monk that was executed by immolation in Malta in 1554 for preaching Lutheran idealisms. He can be considered a martyr of free thinking.

Only one source about Gesualdo exists, and its truthfulness has been questioned in later years.

== Lutheran monk ==
According to the narrative, Gesuald was a French monk who lived in Malta. Around 1535, he founded the Confraternity of Good Christians (La Confraternità dei Buoni Cristiani), where members discussed ideas of Martin Luther, such as marriage among priests. His teachings became popular, especially with Maltese nobility, such as Matteo Falson and his son (who carried the same name), and Pietro Cumbo.

== Condemnation ==
In 1545, he was denounced to Grand Master of the Order of the Knights of Saint John by the notary public Jacopo Baldacchino. Domenico Cubelles, then Bishop of Malta, investigated the matter. However, before 1564, Inquisition was not present in Malta, with such matters falling under the Inquisitor of Palermo. Therefore, the Bishop and the Grand Master Juan de Homedes, since they were concerned with the Reformation ideals starting to arise in the Maltese territory, led the investigation together.

Gesualdo was found guilty of heresy and was incarcerated in the gaols of Fort Saint Angelo. He was released not too long after due to good conduct. In the beginning of the 1550s, he reprised illegally preaching Protestantism with the help of another priest by the name of Andrea Axac (or Axiak).

Once again, he was denounced in 1554, together with a group of 28 others. On 5 November 1554, a tribunal of the Order defrocked him due to preaching heresy, before he was put in front of Bishop Cubelles. Most of the accused, including the priest Axac, agreed to abjure their sins, but Gesualdo, who maintained his faith, was condemned to the burnt alive.

On the stake, Gesualdo continued to preach marriage among priests. He was burnt alive in the main square of Birgu.

== Re-examination ==
Later re-examination of the original documents by scholars has indicated that Gesualdo is not French, but from Calabria, Italy.
