= Philosophy Sharing Foundation =

Foundation in Malta

- Formation: 21 May 2012
- Founder: Adrian Scerri, Aleks Farrugia, Alfred Zammit, Eric Gatt, Josephine Gatt Ciancio, Mark Debono, Mark Montebello, Max Cassar, Meinrad Calleja, Michael Zammit, Sandra Dingli, Vikki Sammut
- Type: Foundation
- Legal status: Legal personality
- Purpose: Philosophy
- Headquarters: 129 St Paul Street, Valletta VLT1216
- Location: Malta
- Coordinates: 35.8833°N 14.5000°E
- Region served: Local
- Services: Public meetings; adult courses
- Members: app. 100
- Official language: English, Maltese
- Chairperson: Dr Max Cassar
- Deputy Chairperson: Ian Rizzo
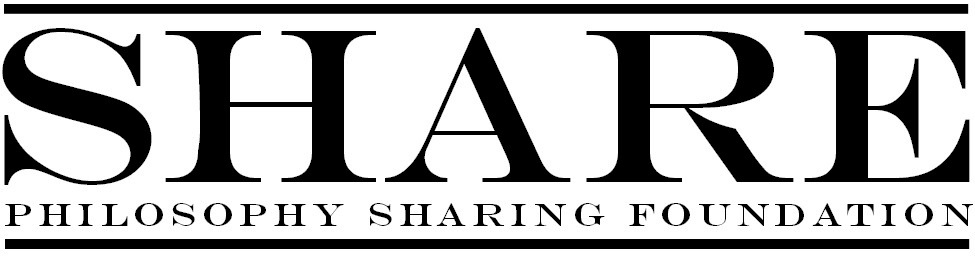
- Main organ
- Website: www.philosophysharing.org

Philosophy Sharing Foundation (PSF) is a non-profit organisation founded in Malta in 2012. Its mission is to bring together philosophy enthusiasts; to inspire, strengthen and promote philosophical activity in the Maltese Islands; and to contribute towards society through Philosophy. The foundation does not adhere to, or profess, any single creed or ideology. Its official languages are Maltese and English.

== Establishment ==
The original idea to create a society in order to provide meeting opportunities, and perhaps study prospects, for members of the general public who were interested in philosophy came from Peter Serracino Inglott. Though he intended to give the initiative a go, he was impeded by his untimely death in March 2012. Subsequently, however, just a few weeks after his death a group of academics, intellectuals and other members of the community came together to bring the idea to fruition. The foundation was established on 21 May 2012, by public act. It started its public operations on the following 22 June.

PSF is registered with the Commission for Voluntary Organisation (VO-0679) and, for the purposes of Maltese law, it is to be considered as a Legal Person (LPF-85).

== Objectives ==
The objectives of PSF are:

- to bring together Maltese philosophers, facilitate discussion of their ideas, and encourage their work;
- to promote philosophical investigation;
- to share philosophical ideas with the Maltese public;
- to assist the documentation, compilation, safe-keeping, and accessibility of the works of Maltese philosophers;
- to disseminate information on Maltese philosophers, their work and their ideas;
- to foster the participation of Maltese philosophers in public debates;
- to further philosophical understanding and knowledge in general.

== Activities ==
The activities of PSF include:

- organising encounters for Maltese philosophers;
- encouraging and facilitating the writing, publication and distribution of works by Maltese philosophers;
- furthering research on past and present Maltese philosophers;
- establishing a central archive with the works of Maltese philosophers;
- coordinating courses, meetings, seminars, conferences and such like gatherings; and
- collaborating with entities which can aid the foundation in its objectives and activities.

== Long-term objectives ==
The long-term objectives of PSF include:

- publishing a periodical for the sharing of ideas;
- setting up an outlet for the sale of material related to philosophy;
- starting an editorial house for the publishing of books on philosophy and other related subjects; and
- affiliating the foundation to an established local or foreign institution of higher education for the conferment of academic recognition in philosophy.

== Membership and management ==
The foundation is governed by a number of members forming a steering committee, two of which are philosophy graduates. The chairperson of the committee is elected by the members of the foundation from among themselves every two years. The committee meets on a regular basis.

The foundation convenes a general assembly each year. The assembly appoints members of the steering committee for the next year of activity, reviews the work done during the preceding year of activity, discusses and adopts amendments to PSF's Foundation Deed, and approves the accounts of the foundation and cause them to be published.

== Main organ ==
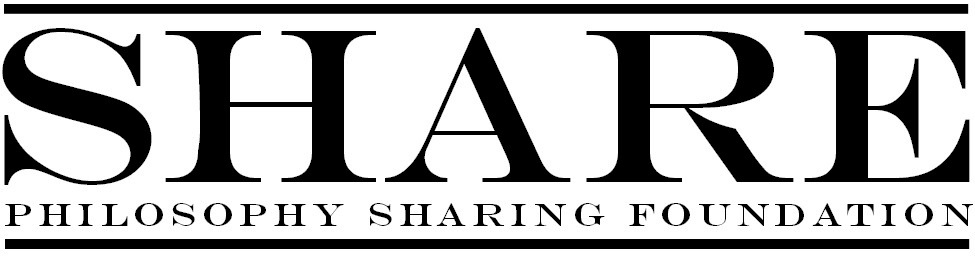

PSF's main organ — called SHARE — is published yearly. The mission of SHARE is to serve as the official platform of the Philosophy Sharing Foundation, and to disseminate articles and information which contribute to philosophical discussion and debate. The magazine includes articles of a philosophical nature.

== Annual Philosophy Lecture ==
The annual philosophy lecture forms part of a tradition that is maintained by the Foundation since it was established on 20 May 2012. The annual lecture is held as close as possible to commemorate the death anniversary of Fr Peter Serracino Inglott.

The annual lectures held so far:

2015 - Jean Paul De Lucca: Ir-Riskju tal-Banalita

2016 - Karl Borg: Il-Kurcifissjoni, Ħampti Damoti u l-Bażi tal-Filosofija u l-Għarfien Uman

2017 - John Ryder: Politics by Twiiter

2018 - John Baldacchino: Beatified Lying

2019 - Stephen Law: Philosophy of Mind: Can Physicalism Be True?

2022 - Peter Singer: Ethics and Animals | Global Poverty and Effective Altruism

2023 - Katarzyna de Lazari-Radek: The Good Life

2024 - Matt Qvrortup - The Democratic Brain

2025 - Thomas O. Scarborough - Holism

== Appreciation ==
By its establishment, PSF introduced a new experience in Malta. Formerly, philosophical activities were restricted to academics somehow connected to the University of Malta. The foundation gave philosophy a wider audience. It involves the general public in philosophical discussions, and also offers evening courses to adult students. The foundation is a member of the International Federation of Philosophy Societies (FISP).
