= Ġan Franġisk Bonamico =

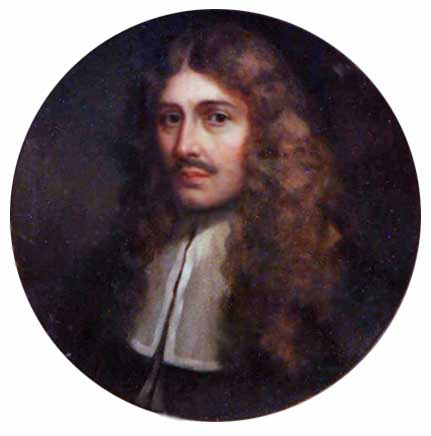

Ġan Franġisk Bonamico (or Giovanni Francesco Bonamico) (1639–1680) was a Maltese doctor and a member of the Order of St. John.

Bonamico wrote in Latin and Italian. One of his best-known works is Mejju ġie bil-Ward u ż-Żahar, which is dedicated to Grandmaster Cottoner. It is kept in the National Library of Malta.
