= Francesca Vincenti =

Maltese windsurfer

Francesca Vincenti is a former windsurfer. She held the National Championship title from 1983 to 1986. Vincenti has been decorated as Malta's Sportswoman of the Year for 1985 and 1986, and ranked among the top 10 at World, European and Pre-Olympic championships.

== Early life ==
Vincenti was born in Mosta. She was the fifth of nine children in the family. She became interested in the water from a young age, though she did not learn to swim until she was 14.

== Career ==
Amongst her titles, Vincenti won the 1985 pre-Olympic International SPA Regatta in the Netherlands, which also made her Dutch National Champion. She was crowned Mistral Freestyle World Champion in 1986, placed 3rd in the international Bermuda Cup in 1984, was 6th in the Sailboard World Championship 1983, held 3rd place in the Giro d'Italia 1983 and 1984 (a two-week, point-to-point, long-distance race around Italy). She clinched 6th in the 1984 Mistral Worlds' in Tunisia, 6th at the Mistral Women's Worlds 1986 La Rochelle France, and won the silver medal at the Mistral Open Europeans in the Isle of Wight in 1995.

In 1988, Vincenti participated in the Malta–Sicily windsurf race, a 60-mile (97 km) long-distance race across the Mediterranean Sea. During the years she resided in the US, she was considered one of the leading surfers on the East Coast in the Mistral Class, having held the number-one rank for that region for some time. She competed regularly in National qualifiers and events.

Vincenti returned to Malta permanently in 1998 and retired from competitive surfing. She remains actively involved in the sport for leisure, and also features in the promotion of Malta as an ideal destination for this activity and all outdoor sport such as climbing, kayaking, and trekking. She is regularly invited to give her technical opinion on television, radio and interviews during high-profile events such as the famous International Rolex Middle Sea Race.

In 2014, Francesca Vincenti was inducted into the Malta Olympic Hall of Fame on the basis of her achievements and for having placed Malta at the top of the sailing/windsurfing spot internationally for several years. She remains an icon in the Maltese Islands as one of the best sports persons in the history of Sport there.

Francesca is an active freediver and promoter of safeguarding the environment and campaigner of a plastic-free world, actively participating with NGO's in cleanups and campaigns.

Vincenti has also worked as an actress and has been cast in several theatrical drama plays and comedies staged at the Manoel Theatre, St James Cavalier, the Salesian Theatre and the Malta Drama Festival. She works in marketing in the tourism sector.
