= Giovanni Francesco Abela =

Maltese historian (1582–1655)

Fra' Giovanni Francesco Abela
- Born: 1582; Valletta, Hospitaller Malta
- Died: 4 May 1655; Valletta, Hospitaller Malta
- Resting place: St. John's Co-Cathedral, Valletta
- Other names: Gian Francesco Abela, Ġian Franġisk Abela
- Education: University of Bologna
- Occupations: Historian, antiquarian, Catholic priest
- Known for: Father of Maltese historiography
- Notable work: Della Descrittione di Malta (1647)

Vice-Chancellor of the Order of Saint John
- In office 11 October 1626 – 18 December 1640
- Appointed by: Council of the Order of Saint John

Giovanni Francesco Abela (1582–1655) was a Maltese noble who in the early 17th century wrote an important work on Malta, Della Descrittione di Malta isola nel Mare Siciliano: con le sue antichità, ed altre notizie, "description of Malta, island in the Sicilian sea, with its antiquities, and other information".

== Early life ==
Abela was born in Valletta to Marco Abela and Benarda Vella whose great great grandfather was Barone di Pietra Lunga and whose ancestors ruled Malta on more than one occasion and were part of the royal family of Spain.

Abela received his first education in Malta, probably in the College of the Jesuit Fathers then recently instituted in Valetta. In Bologna, Abela attended the Archigymnasium and in 1607 obtained the doctorate in both civil and canon law.

== Works ==
Malta illustrated is still an important source of first-hand information on a number of subjects of Melitensia, such as folklore, placenames, the Maltese language, history of Malta and archaeology. His description of the Maltese Islands was translated into Latin by G.A. Seinero in 1725, Latin being the universal language of science and culture of that time. This translation was incorporated in Johann Georg Graevius Thesaurus antiquitatum et historiarum Italiae.

He became Auditor of Grand Master Antoine de Paule, Chaplain and finally Vice Chancellor of the Knights Hospitaller. He is also remembered as the promoter of the first Notarial Archives for Malta.

Gian Francesco Abela visited archaeological sites on the islands and made some valuable observations. He appears to have been the first to note that the ancient temple of Hercules was to be identified with the remains on the hill at Tas-Silġ rather than those of Borġ in-Nadur. At Tas-Silġ he observed foundations and courses of stones ‘ben lavorate e messe insieme,’ and in support of his identification he recorded the discovery of ‘medaglie, pezzi di statue d’idoletti, e d’altre cose, minimi avanzi di quella vana gentilità e falsa religione, quivi ritrovate sotto il Magistero del Principe Wignacourt, mentre alcuni nell’istesso luogo cavando, scioccamente pensavano far acquisto di ricco tesoro.’

In the early 17th century Abela converted his house at Marsa to a historical museum, the first in Malta. Many of its artefacts are now stored in Malta's National Museum of Archaeology.

== Burial place ==
He is buried in the Chapel of Our Lady of Philermos (today the Chapel of the Blessed Sacrament) in Saint John's Co-Cathedral in Valletta. The Junior College in Msida is named after Abela.

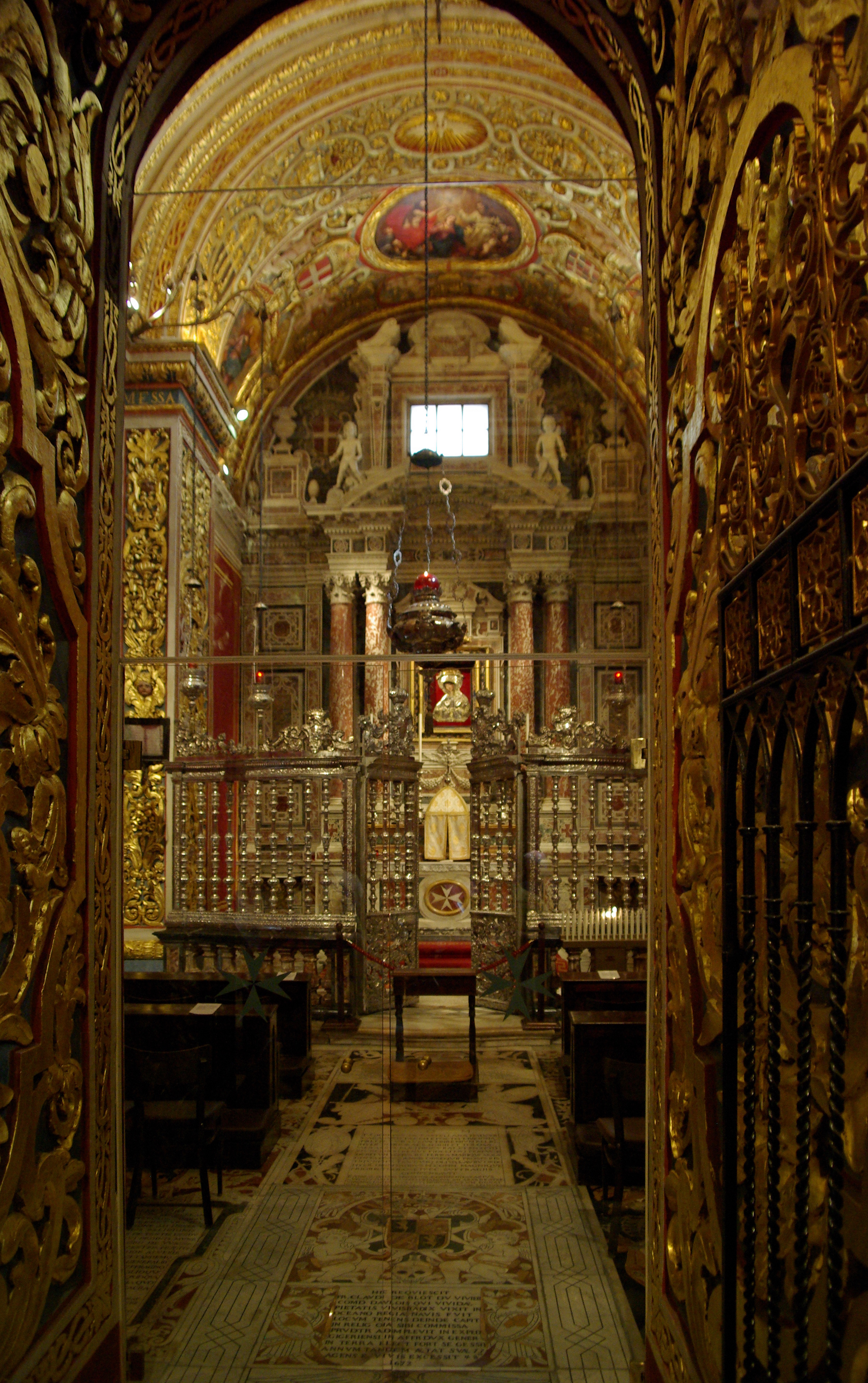
Chapel of Our Lady of Philermos

== Publications ==
- Abela, Giovanfrancesco (1647). Della Descrittione di Malta isola nel Mare Siciliano: con le sue antichità, ed altre notizie. Malta: Paolo Bonacota.

== See also ==
- Siege of Malta (1565)
- Birgu
- Ġgantija
- Ħaġar Qim
