= Godfrey Wettinger =

Maltese historian

Godfrey Wettinger (22 December 1929 – 22 May 2015) was a Maltese historian. Together with Mikiel Fsadni, he extensively researched on Il-Kantilena, the oldest known work written in Maltese, and presented it to the public for the first time.

== Biography ==
Wettinger was born on 22 December 1929 in Mosta. His father, the headmaster of schools in Mellieħa and Għargħur died from cancer during Wettinger's childhood. Following his father's death, he was raised in Mellieħa by his mother and attended the Lyceum in Ħamrun as a student. He later studied history by correspondence at London University, where he graduated with a BA in History in 1953, MA in 1965 and PhD in 1971. Wettinger remained a bachelor throughout his life and died on 22 May 2015 at the age of 85. He was awarded the National Order of Merit in 1996.

== Career ==
Wettinger started lecturing at the University of Malta in 1972 and held various posts at the university throughout his career, including Head of the Department of History and Dean of the Faculty of Arts. He also held various terms as the President of the Malta Historical Society (1984-1986, 1989-1992, 1997-1999, 2003-2005) and was a founding member and editor of Melita Historica, the society's official journal. In 2014, Wettinger was awarded a Lifetime Achievement award for his contribution to literature during the National Book Prize, held by Malta's National Book Council.

Wettinger wrote extensively about slavery in Malta and published a comprehensive history on the subject in 2002.
