= Il-Kantilena =

Maltese poem by Pietru Caxaro

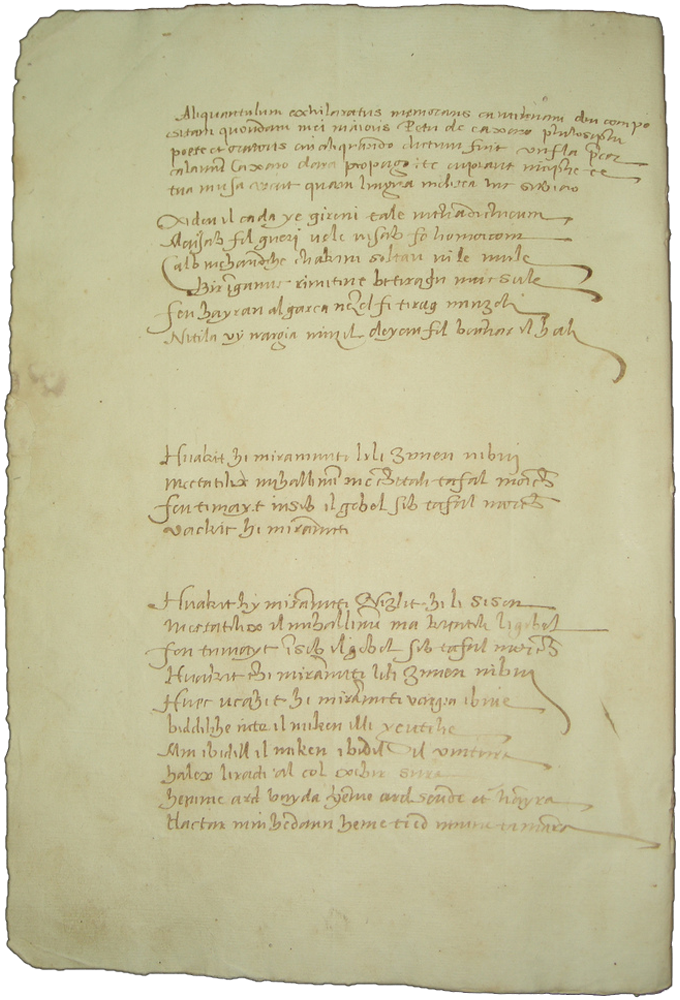
Il-Kantilena

Il-Kantilena (lit. 'The old song') is the oldest known literary text in the Maltese language. It dates from the 15th century (no later than 1485, the death of its author, and probably from the 1470s), but was not found until 1966 by the historian Mikiel Fsadni. The poem is attributed to Pietru Caxaro, and was recorded by Caxaro's nephew, Brandano, in his notarial register (Dec. 1533 – May 1563). It is preserved at the Notarial Archives in Valletta. In April 2025, Il-Kantilena was added to UNESCO's Memory of the World Register.

Although written in Maltese, in Latin script, it was a very early form that had not yet been influenced much by Romance languages, and is thus an example of Old Maltese. This text contains many Arabic morphemes. The only Romance words are vintura 'luck', sometimes translated into English as 'fate', and et 'and'. In general, early Maltese texts contain very little non-Arabic vocabulary; even in later texts, poetry tends to use more Arabic vocabulary than general language use does, therefore while certainly of historical interest, Il-Kantilena most likely does not reflect the spoken language of the common Maltese of the time, but rather that of the elite who spoke a stilted form more pleasing to the ruling class.

However, literary evidence suggests that the spoken language in the 13th century was Arabic since ire was raised when the bishop of Malta resident in Sicily appointed Italian-speaking priests to the island. Both islands were occupied by the Arabs in the early medieval period, but Malta's relative isolation limited the diffusion of Italian cognates until much later.

In December 2024, the University of Malta unveiled a large mural in the tunnel beneath Regional Road, directed by Pep Walls and painted by the students Sherise Attard, Edera Muscat, Kristine Saliba Caruana, Peter Aquilina, Carlos Cutajar, Aden Cacciattolo, and Mikael Scicluna. Themed around the Maltese identity and destruction of Maltese fauna, it features verses from Il-Kantilena. Its essence is to "communicate the sense of movement as well as the change in our genetics that we pass on over time", in Scicluna's words, and the line "Waqgħet hi, imrammti, l’ili żmien nibni" [It (she) fell, my building, its foundations collapsed] evokes a crab's imagined anger at the loss of their habitat.

A panorama of the mural, taken in 2026

== Text ==
- Original orthography

Xideu il cada ye gireni tale nichadithicum
Mensab fil gueri uele nisab fo homorcom
Calb mehandihe chakim soltan ui le mule
Bir imgamic rimitne betiragin mucsule
Fen hayran al garca nenzel fi tirag minzeli
Nitla vu nargia ninzil deyem fil bachar il hali.

Huakit hi mirammiti lili zimen nibni
Mectatilix mihallimin me chitali tafal morchi
fen timayt insib il gebel sib tafal morchi
vackit hi mirammiti.

Huakit hy mirammiti Nizlit hi li sisen
Mectatilix li mihallimin ma kitatili li gebel
fen tumayt insib il gebel sib tafal morchi
Huakit thi mirammiti lili zimen nibni
Huec ucakit hi mirammiti vargia ibnie
biddilihe inte il miken illi yeutihe
Min ibidill il miken ibidil i vintura
halex liradi ’al col xibir sura
hemme ard bayad v hemme ard seude et hamyra
Hactar min hedann heme tred mine tamara.

- Modern orthography

Xidew il-qada, ja ġirieni, talli nħadditkom,
Ma nsab fil-weri u la nsab f’għomorkom
Qalb m’għandha ħakem, sultan u la mula
Bir imgħammiq irmietni, b’turġien muqsula,
Fejn ħajran għall-għarqa, ninżel f’taraġ minżli
Nitla’ u nerġa’ ninżel dejjem fil-baħar il-għoli.

Waqgħet hi, imrammti, l’ili żmien nibni,
Ma ħtatlix mgħallmin, ’mma qatagħli tafal merħi;
Fejn tmajt insib il-ġebel, sibt tafal merħi;
Waqgħet hi, imrammti.

Waqgħet hi, imrammti, niżżlet hi s-sisien,
Ma ħtatlix l-imgħallmin, ’mma qatgħatli l-ġebel;
Fejn tmajt insib il-ġebel, sibt tafal merħi;
Waqgħet hi, imrammti, l’ili żmien nibni.
U hekk waqgħet hi, imrammti! w erġa’ ibniha!
Biddilha inti l-imkien illi jewtiha;
Min ibiddel l-imkien ibiddel il-vintura;
Għaliex l-iradi għal kull xiber sura:
Hemm art bajda, w hemm art sewda u ħamra.
Aktar minn hedawn hemm trid minnha tamra.

- Arabic orthography

اشهدوا القعدة يا جيراني ،تعالوا نحدّثكم،
ما انصاب في الواري ولا انصاب في عمركم
قلب ما عندهاش حاكم، سلطان ولا مولى
بير معمّق رماتني بدرجان مقسولة
فين حيران عالغرقة، ننزل في درج منزالي
نطلع ونرجع ننزل دايم في البحر العالي

وقعت هي مرمّتي، ليلي زمان نبني،
ما خطاتليش المعلمين أما قطعلي طَفَل مرخي
فين طمعت نصيب الجبل، صبت طَفَل مرخي
وقعت هي مرمّتي

وقعت هي مرمّتي، نزلت هي السّيسان
ما خطاتليش المعلمين أما قطعلي الجبل
فين طمعت نصيب الجبل، صبت طفل مرخي
وقعت هي مرمّتي، ليلي زمان نبني،
وهكّ وقعت هي، مرمّتي وارجع ابنيها
بدّلها انتِ للمكان اللّي يواتيها
من يبدل المكان يبدل ال"فنتورة"
علاش الأراضي على كل شبر صورة
فمّ (ثمّة) أرض بيضاء وفمّ أرض سوداء وحمراء
أكثر من هاذون فمّ تريد منها ثمرها ثمرة

=== Approximate English translation ===
Witness my predicament, my friends (neighbours), as I shall relate it to you:
[What] never has there been, neither in the past, nor in your lifetime,
A [similar] heart, ungoverned, without lord or king (sultan),
That threw me down a well, with broken stairs
Where, yearning to drown, I descend the steps of my downfall,
I climb back up and down again, always faced with high seas.

It (she) fell, my building, its foundations collapsed;
It was not the builders’ fault, but the rock gave way,
Where I had hoped to find rock, I found loose clay
It (she) fell, my edifice, (that) which I had been building for so long.

And so, my edifice subsided, and I shall have to build it up again,
You change it to the site that suits her/it
Who changes his place, changes his fate!
for each (piece of land) has its own shape (features);
there is white land and there is black land, and red
But above all, (what) you want from it is a fruit.

=== Approximate Maltese translation using Modern Vocabulary ===
Araw din il-qagħda, ħbieb, li se naqsam magħkom,
rigward dak li qatt ma nstab fl-imgħoddi u lanqas f'għomorkom.
Qalb bla ħakkiem, sultan u lanqas sid
li f'bir fond ramietni, b’turġien immermrin,
Fejn magħmul għall-għarqa, ninżel taraġ wieqaf
Nitla’ u nerġa’ ninżel dejjem fil-baħar għoli.

Waqgħa, is-sur, li ili żmien nibni,
Mhux tort il-bennejja, imma kien it-tafal ċeda;
Fejn ridt insib il-ġebel, sibt tafal jċedi;
Waqgħa, is-sur.

Waqgħa, is-sur, waqgħulu s-sisien,
Mhux tort il-bennejja, imma kien it-tafal ċeda;
Fejn ridt insib il-ġebel, sibt tafal jċedi;
Waqgħa, is-sur, li ili żmien nibni
U hekk waqgħa, is-sur! u se nerġa’ nibnih!
Tbiddillu int il-post illi jixraqlu;
Min ibiddel l-post ibiddel ix-xorti;
Għaliex hemm artijiet ta' kull sura:
Hemm art bajda, u hemm art sewda u anka ħamra.
Imma warakollox, li trid minnhom huwa il-frott.

== Bibliography ==
- Friggieri, Oliver (1994), "Main Trends in the History of Maltese Literature", Neohelicon, 21 (2): 59–69, doi:10.1007/BF02093244, S2CID 144795860
