= Maltese literature =

Maltese literature

By category
Maltese
List of writers

Maltese authors

Writers - Novelists
Playwrights - Poets
Essayists

Forms

Novel - Poetry - Plays

Criticism & Awards

Literary theory - Critics
Literary Prizes

See also

Mikiel Anton Vassalli - Taħt Tliet Saltniet
Il-Kantilena - Rużar Briffa
Manuel Magri

Malta Portal
Literature Portal

Maltese literature is any literature originating from Malta or by Maltese writers or literature written in the Maltese language.

== History ==
=== Written Maltese ===
As Maltese evolved after Count Roger I of Sicily ended Arab rule on the island at the end of the 11th century, there was little interest in developing a written form of the language. Initially only the clergy, aristocracy and bourgeoisie were able to read and write and much of their communication was conducted in Latin. Throughout the centuries use of the Maltese language was often discouraged with varying enthusiasm, ostensibly in the hope that supplanting it would strengthen ties with the country which held possession of Malta at that particular point in time. Under the Knights of St John both Italian and French were used for official documents and correspondence. During the British colonial period the use of English was encouraged through education, with Italian regarded as the next most influential language. It was not until 1936 that Maltese was recognised as the island's official language. Uniquely, no other European country lacked a standardised written form of its language until the 19th century, when men such as Mikiel Anton Vassalli made a concerted effort to transcribe spoken Maltese into a written form, although examples of written Maltese exist from as early as the 15th century.

==== Diglossia ====
The development of native Maltese literary works has historically been hampered by the diglossia that has characterized the culture of Malta throughout its history. For many centuries, Maltese was known as the language "of the kitchen and the workshop", while Italian was the language of education, literature, the arts, law and commerce. Hence, until the early 20th century, the vast majority of literary works in Malta were written in Italian by the community of Maltese Italians. In early Maltese history, diglossia manifested itself in the co-existence of a developed form of Siculo-Arabic and the language of a series of rulers, most notably Latin, Greek, Sicilian, French, Spanish and Italian. From 1800 onwards these were largely supplanted by English. The Maltese language is today heavily overlaid with Romance and English influences as a result.

According to Oliver Friggieri:

Maltese writers developed an uninterrupted local "Italian" literary movement which went on up to about four decades ago, whereas Maltese as a literary idiom started to coexist on a wide scale in the last decades of the 19th century. Whilst Maltese has the historical priority on the level of the spoken language, Italian has the priority of being the almost exclusive written medium, for the socio-cultural affairs, for the longest period. The native tongue had only to wait for the arrival of a new mentality which could integrate an unwritten, popular tradition with a written, academically respectable one.

==== The emergence of Maltese literature ====
The oldest known literary text in the Maltese language is Pietru Caxaro's poem, Il-Kantilena (c. 1470 to 1485) (also known as Xidew il-Qada), followed by Gian Francesco Bonamico's sonnet of praise to Grand Master Nicolas Cotoner, Mejju gie' bl'Uard, u Zahar (The month of May has arrived, with roses and orange blossoms), c. 1672. The earliest known Maltese dictionary was written by Francois de Vion Thezan Court (c. 1640). In 1700, an anonymous Gozitan poet wrote Jaħasra Mingħajr Ħtija (Unfortunately Innocent). A Maltese translation of the Lord's Prayer appeared in Johannes Heinrich Maius's work Specimen Lingua Punicæ in hodierna Melitensium superstitis (1718), demonstrating the formerly wide-held belief that the language had a Punic heritage. A collection of religious sermons by a certain Dun Ignazio Saverio Mifsud, published between 1739 and 1746, is regarded as the earliest known example of Maltese prose.

An anonymous poem entitled Fuqek Nitħaddet Malta (I am talking about you, Malta), was written c. 1749, regarding the Conspiracy of the Slaves. A few years later, in 1752, a catechism entitled Tagħlim Nisrani ta' Dun Franġisk Wizzino (Don Francesco Wizzino's Christian Teachings) was published in both Maltese and Italian. The occasion of Carnival in 1760 saw the publication of a collection of burlesque verses under the heading Żwieġ la Maltija (Marriage, in the Maltese Style), by Dun Feliċ Demarco.

A child of the Romantic movement, Maltese patriot Mikiel Anton Vassalli (1764–1829) hailed the emergence of literary Maltese as "one of the ancient patrimonies...of the new emerging nation" and saw this nascent trend as: (1) the affirmation of the singular and collective identity, and (2) the cultivation and diffusion of the national speech medium as the most sacred component in the definition of the patria and as the most effective justification both for a dominated community's claim to be a nation and for the subsequent struggle against foreign rulers.

Between 1798 and 1800, while Malta was under French occupation, a Maltese translation of L-Għanja tat-Trijonf tal-Libertà (Ode to the Triumph of Liberty), by Citizen La Coretterie, Secretary to the French Government Commissioner, was published on the occasion of Bastille Day.

The first translation into Maltese of a biblical text, the Gospel of St. John, was published in 1822 (trans. Ġużeppi Marija Cannolo), on the initiative of the Bible Society in Malta. The first Maltese language newspaper, l-Arlekkin Jew Kawlata Ingliża u Maltija (The Harlequin, or a mix of English and Maltese) appeared in 1839, and featured the poems l-Imħabba u Fantasija (Love and Fantasy) and Sunett (A Sonnett).

The first epic poem in Maltese, Il-Ġifen Tork (The Turkish Caravel), by Giovanni Antonio Vassallo, was published in 1842, followed by Ħrejjef bil-Malti (Legends in Maltese) and Ħrejjef u Ċajt bil-Malti (Legends and Jokes in Maltese) in 1861 and 1863 respectively. The same author published the first history book in the Maltese language entitled Storja ta’ Malta Miktuba għall-Poplu (The People's History of Malta) in 1862.

1863 saw the publication of the first novel in Maltese, Elvira Jew Imħabba ta’ Tirann (Elvira, or the Love of a Tyrant) by the Neapolitan author, Giuseppe Folliero de Luna. Anton Manwel Caruana's novel Ineż Farruġ (1889), the first Maltese novel, was modelled on traditional Italian historical novels, such as Manzoni's The Betrothed, and has been the subject of recent scholarly attention.

==== Notable Maltese writers ====
- Clare Azzopardi
- Antoine Cassar
- John A. Bonello
- Ġużè Bonnici
- Rużar Briffa
- Lina Brockdorff
- Anton Buttigieg
- Ray Buttigieg
- Pietru Caxaro
- Ninu Cremona
- Francis Ebejer
- Leanne Ellul
- Victor Fenech
- Oliver Friggieri
- Alfons Maria Galea
- Ġużè Galea
- Herbert Ganado
- David Samuel Hudson
- Lon Kirkop
- Karmenu Mallia
- Daniel Massa
- Mary Meilak
- Doreen Micallef
- Immanuel Mifsud
- Achille Mizzi
- Walid Nabhan
- Gioacchino Navarro
- Ġorġ Pisani
- Dun Karm Psaila
- Ġużè Cassar Pullicino
- Frans Said
- Frans Sammut
- Reginald Vella Tomlin
- Mikiel Anton Vassalli
- Emanuel Benjamin Vella
- Godfrey Wettinger
- Trevor Żahra

== Poetry ==
=== Il-Kantilena ===
Il-Kantilena is the oldest written text known to exist in Maltese, dating from no later than 1485, the death of Pietru Caxaro, the author it is attributed to. It was not rediscovered until 1966 or 1968 by Godfrey Wettinger and Fr. Mikiel Fsadni in the Valletta Notarial Archives. Frans Sammut published a revolutionary interpretation of it in 2009. Karmenu Mallia translated it into Esperanto and wrote an article about it in 'Literatura Foiro'.

== Contemporary literature ==
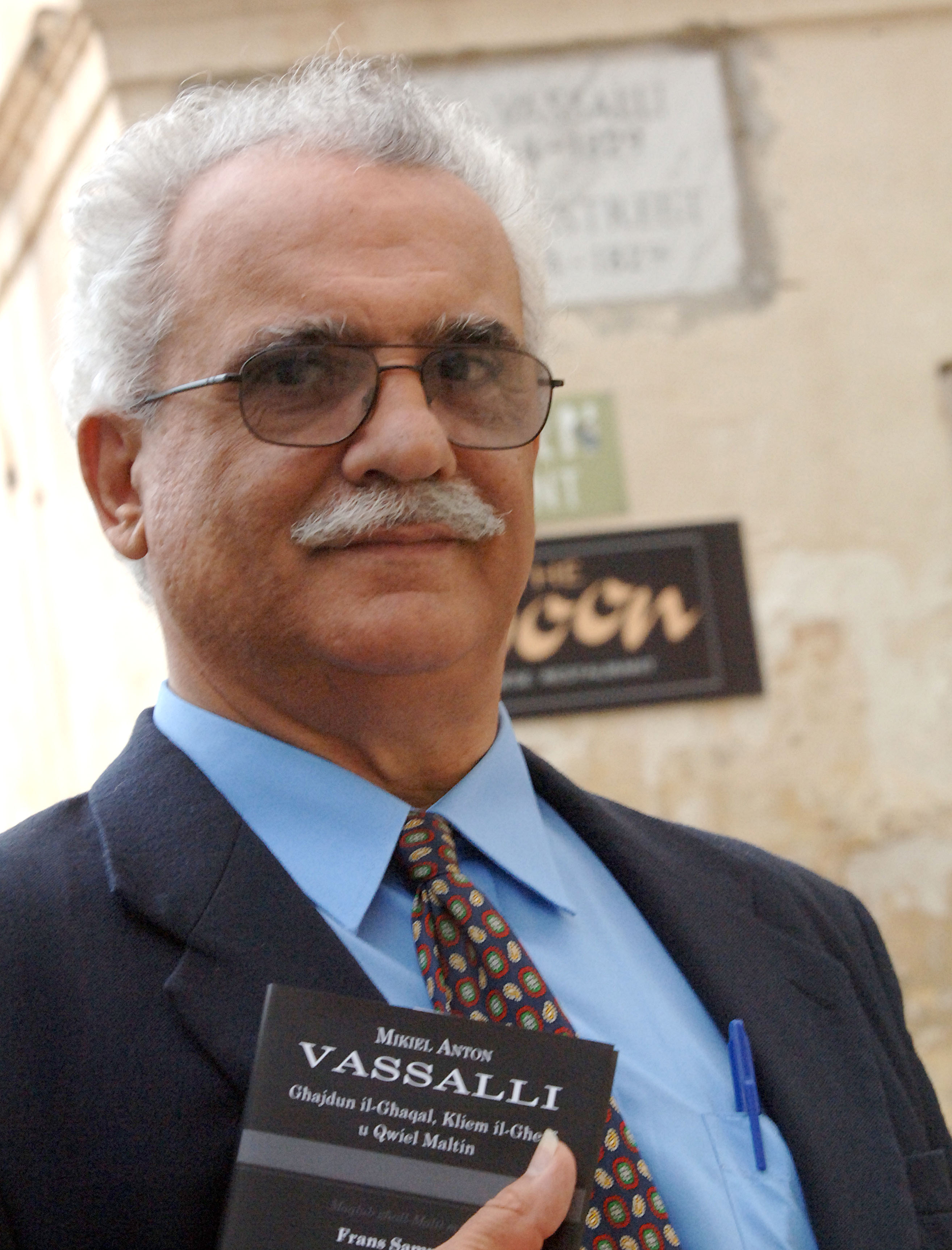
Frans Sammut holding a copy of Mikiel Anton Vassalli's collection of Maltese proverbs.

The post-War years saw the emergence of Moviment Qawmien Letterarju (Literary Revival Movement) in 1967, an avant-garde literary movement the protagonists of which included Oliver Friggieri (later Professor of Maltese at the University of Malta), Frans Sammut (1945–2011), the "national author", Alfred Sant (who was Prime Minister from 1996 to 1998), Lino Spiteri (who was Finance Minister in two Governments), and others.

Among Oliver Friggieri's most important works is the collection of his poems.

Frans Sammut's reputation is built on his novels Il-Gaġġa (on which the film with the same name is based), Samuraj, Paceville and Il-Ħolma Maltija (translated in Esperanto as La Malta Revo). Alfred Sant is known for his theatre collected mostly in his Fid-Dell tal-Katidral u Drammi Ohra, whereas Lino Spiteri became renowned for his novel Rivoluzzjoni Do Minore and his short stories.

The Moviment Qawmien Letterarju scene eventually gave way to a new wave of writers, whose voices have shaped the contemporary literature scene. Foremost amongst these are writers such as Albert Marshall, Immanuel Mifsud, Adrian Grima, and Antoine Cassar. The contemporary scene has also seen the emergence of a new generation of writers including Simone Inguanez, Nadia Mifsud, Simone Galea, Elizabeth Grech, Clare Azzopardi, Lon Kirkop, Kirsten Spiteri and Lara Calleja who won the European Union Prize for Literature for her book Kissirtu Kullimkien.

Nowadays Maltese literature is dominated by literature in the Maltese language (e.g., Alex Vella Gera, Guze' Stagno), some works in English (David Samuel Hudson and Francis Ebejer for instance), and some works in Italian, such as the poems of Judge J.J. Cremona and Albert Caruana's ebook Il Sindaco di Racalmusci.

Walid Nabhan has published two books of short stories in Maltese, and one novel titled L-Eżodu taċ-Ċikonji (2013) which won the Maltese National Prize for Literature in 2014, and the EU Prize for Literature in 2017. He published a collection of poetry in Maltese in 2014. Nabhan has also translated works of Maltese literature into Arabic.

== List of books in Maltese ==
- Taħt Tliet Saltniet
- Żmien L-Ispanjoli
- Il-Gaġġa
- Samuraj
- Il-Ħolma Maltija
- Paceville
- Perfettament Imperfetta
- Mitt Elf Isem Ieħor: HappyVeganGirlJules
- Kissirtu Kullimkien
- Lucy Min?
- Il-Fiddien
- Kulħadd Ħalla Isem Warajh
- Rokit
- L-Eżodu taċ-Ċikonji
- Naked as Water
