= Mary Meilak =

Maltese poet (1905–1975)

- Meilak in 1925
- Born: 9 August 1905; Victoria, Gozo
- Died: 1 January 1975 (aged 69)
- Education: Central School in Gozo
- Occupation: Poet
- Writing career
- Language: Maltese
- Genre: Romantic poetry
- Notable work: Pleġġ il-Hena (1945)

Mary Meylak (9 August 1905 – 1 January 1975) was a Maltese poet. she holds a unique place in the history of Maltese literature in that she is the first recorded female Maltese poet as well as the first Maltese woman to publish a book of collected poetry. She was a contemporary of Gan Anton Vassallo, Dwardu Cachia, Dun Karm, Anastasju Cuschieri, Ninu Cremona, Ġużè Delia, Ġorġ Zammit, Ġorġ Pisani, and Anton Buttigieg.

== Biography ==
Born in Victoria, Gozo, on 9 August 1905, to Ġorġ and Mananni, she received her education at the Central School in Gozo.

Meylak worked in government offices for seventeen years, until becoming a teacher in 1942. She derived great satisfaction from teaching and held her position up until her retirement twenty years later.

Meylak wrote her first poem, Faxx Nemel (A Trail of Ants), when she was 25 years old, in 1930. In 1945, she published her first collection of poems titled Pleġġ il-Hena (A Pledge to Joy). She also published two volumes of essays titled Nirraġunaw u Nitbissmu (Let's Reason and Smile), three novels titled Nokkla Sewda (Black Locks), San Nikola tal-Venturi (St Nicolas of Venturi) and It-Tewmin tal-Birgu (The Twins of Vittoriosa), as well as two operas and some operettas.

A set of currently unpublished poems show a different side to Meylak, with works that shed light on her experiences and perspectives during World War II. These poems are evidence of Meylak's sympathies with the British Empire, as well as her intense patriotism, which is evident in poems that employ the hyperbolic and heartening language often found in war time poetry.

For many years, Meylak was also a regular contributor to "Leħen is-Sewwa" (The Voice of Truth), a print publication established by the ecclesiastical authorities of Malta on September 1, 1928, and which is still run by volunteers from Malta Catholic Action. Many of the poems which Meylak contributed to this publication were of a religious nature, including a series of works related to the Passion of Christ, which were gathered into one volume under the title L-Istrumenti tal-Passjoni (Instruments of the Passion) by Frank L. Mercieca in 2005.

She died on 1 January 1975, at the age of 69. On the centenary of her birth, a memorial was erected in her honor in her hometown of Victoria, Gozo.

== Style and themes ==
L-Akkademja tal-Malti describes Meylak as the only female voice among the Maltese Romantic poets who were working during the first half of the 20th century. As Prof. Oliver Friggieri observes:

"Not only does Mary Meylak stand apart from the other poets in that she does not allude to the existential and historical angst of her time, but also because her form of expression is at its best when it throws a fantastical lens on the world around her."

Prof. Ġużè Aquilina and Prof. Peter Serracino Inglott also observe that Meylak had a quick hand and a technically interesting style in that (perhaps unbeknownst to her) she tended to employ the metric found in Arabic poetry rather than the Greek and Italian literary forms which influenced most of her contemporaries.

Meylak's verse is known for its ease and accessibility, embracing colourful flights of fancy, a vision of nature as a limitless horizon, religious themes, the use of alliteration and onomatopoeia, and other elements that lend her work the simple and melodious tone that characterizes her poetic identity. It is this lightness of being communicated through her work that leads Prof. Oliver Friggieri to compare Meylak to "a sorceress who transforms inner life into words."

== Selected works ==
- Pleġġ il-Hena (1945)
- Nirraġunaw u Nitbissmu 1 (1946)
- Nirraġunaw u Nitbissmu 2 (1947)
- Dawra Misterjuża (1947)
- Villa Meylak: Ġonna ta' Kulħadd (1947)
- Album: Poeżiji (1947)
- Nokkla Sewda (1958)
- Songs You Will Like (1971)
- L-Istrumenti tal-Passjoni (2005)
