= Lara Calleja =

Maltese writer

- Born: August 20, 1988 (age 36)
- Notable awards: 2021 EU Prize for Literature

Lara Calleja (born 20 August 1988) is a Maltese novelist and playwright.

== Early and personal life ==
She was raised in the village of Marsaskala. She attended a Catholic secondary school and studied Near Eastern studies at university, graduating with honors in 2010. After graduating, Calleja worked part-time as a librarian for six years. In 2020, she quit a career in tourism to become a freelance writer and translator.

Calleja has been involved in political activism since she was 16. She has joined the activist organization Moviment Graffitti. She has congenital myasthenia gravis, which "causes weaknesses in her facial features and arms".

== Writing career ==
Calleja has cited Immanuel Mifsud as her "wake-up call" to Maltese literature, encountering his work when she was 17. Mifsud later met Calleja, and encouraged her to continue writing.

Her debut novel, Lucy Min?, was published in 2016 and was nominated for the Maltese National Book Prize. The work is a coming-of-age novel following the titular Lucy. Miriam Calleja, for the Times of Malta, noted of the work, "Calleja has set out to write what some would consider unwritable: the dark, not-so-polite thoughts, the anonymous one-night-stands, and the downright awkwardness that might be distinctively Maltese".

She began writing her second book, the short story anthology Kissirtu Kullimkien (You Have Destroyed Everything), in 2016; it was published in 2020. The work won the National Book Prize for new writers. The book also won the 2021 EU Prize for Literature, making her the first Maltese women to win the award.

Many of Calleja's stories contain political elements, as in her anthology, where many of the stories deal with over-construction, and one which centers a "traumatised migrant".

Calleja is also a playwright; her debut play Taralalla was staged at the Spazju Kreattiv venue in Valletta in late 2021.

Calleja is also the founder and CEO of the speech-writing service Mil-Qalb.

== Publications ==
- Lucy min? (Merlin Publishers, 2016)
- Kissirtu Kullimkien (Merlin Publishers, 2020)

== Awards ==
- 2017 National Book Award shortlist, for Lucy min?
- 2021 EU Prize for Literature, for Kissirtu Kullimkien
- 2021 National Book Prize for new writers, for Kissirtu Kullimkien
