= Elizabeth Grech =

Maltese writer and translator

Elizabeth Grech (born 13 July 1978 in Pietà, Malta) is a Maltese writer and translator.

== Life and work ==
Grech studied Contemporary Mediterranean Studies, Anthropology and French at the University of Malta and the University of Provence, from where she obtained a BA and Masters in Ethnology.

She lives in Paris, France, and works as a professional translator, translating from Italian and French into English. Her literary translation work, however, focuses on work from Maltese to French.

Grech has been professionally involved with various voluntary and civil organisations including Inizjamed (Malta) and the former René Seydoux Foundation (Paris) where she served as cultural manager for over 10 years. She has also worked as editor for the English version of babelmed.net curating articles on Mediterranean cultures and societies. Grech is a consultant with the CIHEAM (International Centre for Advanced Mediterranean Agronomic Studies). She is currently engaged with Mana Chuma Teatro, (Italy) where she is in charge of translation, communications, networking and international relations. Grech is also a founding and board member of HELA (The Hub for Excellence in the Literary Arts).

Grech has read her works at a number of international poetry events, including as part of a UNESCO International Poetry Day event organised by EUNIC and at the International Festival of Poetry in Sidi Bou Said in Tunisia. She was also a guest author at the Malta Mediterranean Literature Festival 2019. A number of Grech's poems have been translated to Romanian by poet and translator Valeriu Butulescu.

=== bejn baħar u baħar ===
Her poetry has been published in various local and international literary journals. Her first collection of poems, bejn baħar u baħar (between one sea and another) was published in Malta by Merlin publishers in 2019.

Fellow Maltese writer Clare Azzopardi, said that Grech's poems are "calm, silent, teasing, just like the sea". The poems attest to Grech's love for the Mediterranean sea and present a strong personal narrative of longing and love which keeps recurring throughout the book.

=== Contribution to Maltese literature ===
Grech has translated the works of key figures in Maltese literature including poets and writers like Maria Grech Ganado, Antoine Cassar, Norbert Bugeja, John Aquilina, Clare Azzopardi, Adrian Grima and John Portelli.
