= Lina Brockdorff =

Maltese author, playwright and radio broadcaster (1930–2026)

Lina Brockdorff

Lina Brockdorff (21 May 1930 – 10 February 2026) was a Maltese author, playwright and radio broadcaster.

== Early life and education ==
Brockdorff was born in Senglea on 21 May 1930, to Patrick and Mary Mahoney. Her early life was marked by the outbreak of World War II when Brockdorff was nine years old. Her family moved multiple times throughout the war, living in various localities such as Vittoriosa, Sliema, Dingli and Rabat.

Brockdorff's early education was interrupted by the outbreak of the war, but when the war was over she returned to school on her father's insistence. She wanted to pursue a medical career; however, her family could not afford to send her to university and enrolled her in a teacher's training course without informing her. She resumed her education later in life, when she enrolled in a one-year introductory course in theology in 1991, followed by a five-year Bachelor's course. She eventually obtained a master's degree in theology and humanities in 2002 at the age of 72.

== Career ==
Brockdorff's teaching career began at a State primary school; however, she stopped teaching to raise her four children. During this time, she focused on her writing. She later continued her career at St Aloysius College as an English-language teacher. She served as a council member of L-Akkademja tal-Malti between 2004 and 2005 and remained an academy member for the rest of her life. She also served as President of Għaqda Letterarja Maltija for eight years and was a member of Għaqda Poeti Maltin.

== Writings ==
Brockdorff began writing at the age of 17 whilst attending the teachers' training college, where scholar Ġużè Aquilina would encourage his students to write short stories or essays for broadcast on radio. She was highly prolific throughout the subsequent decades, writing and producing several programmes that were aired on Rediffusion throughout the 1950s and 1960s, including Ħlieqa Bejnietna, Quddiem il-Mera, Nofs Siegħa Flimkien, and Magic in the Kitchen.

Brockdorff wrote several radio plays, including Il-Fqajjar t'Assisi. Some of her works were also broadcast on Australian radio.

Throughout her career, she wrote six anthologies, twelve novels and over 340 novellas. She also wrote an autobiography about her experience of World War II called Sireni u Serenati (Serenades Amidst The Sirens), which was awarded a prize as Best novel - Non Fiction by the National Book Council of Malta in 2004. It was also subsequently serialised and broadcast on various radio stations. She was awarded the Gold Medal at Ġieħ l-Akkademja tal-Malti.

== Death ==
Brockdorff died on 10 February 2026, at the age of 95.
