= Nadia Mifsud =

Maltese-French poet, novelist, and translator

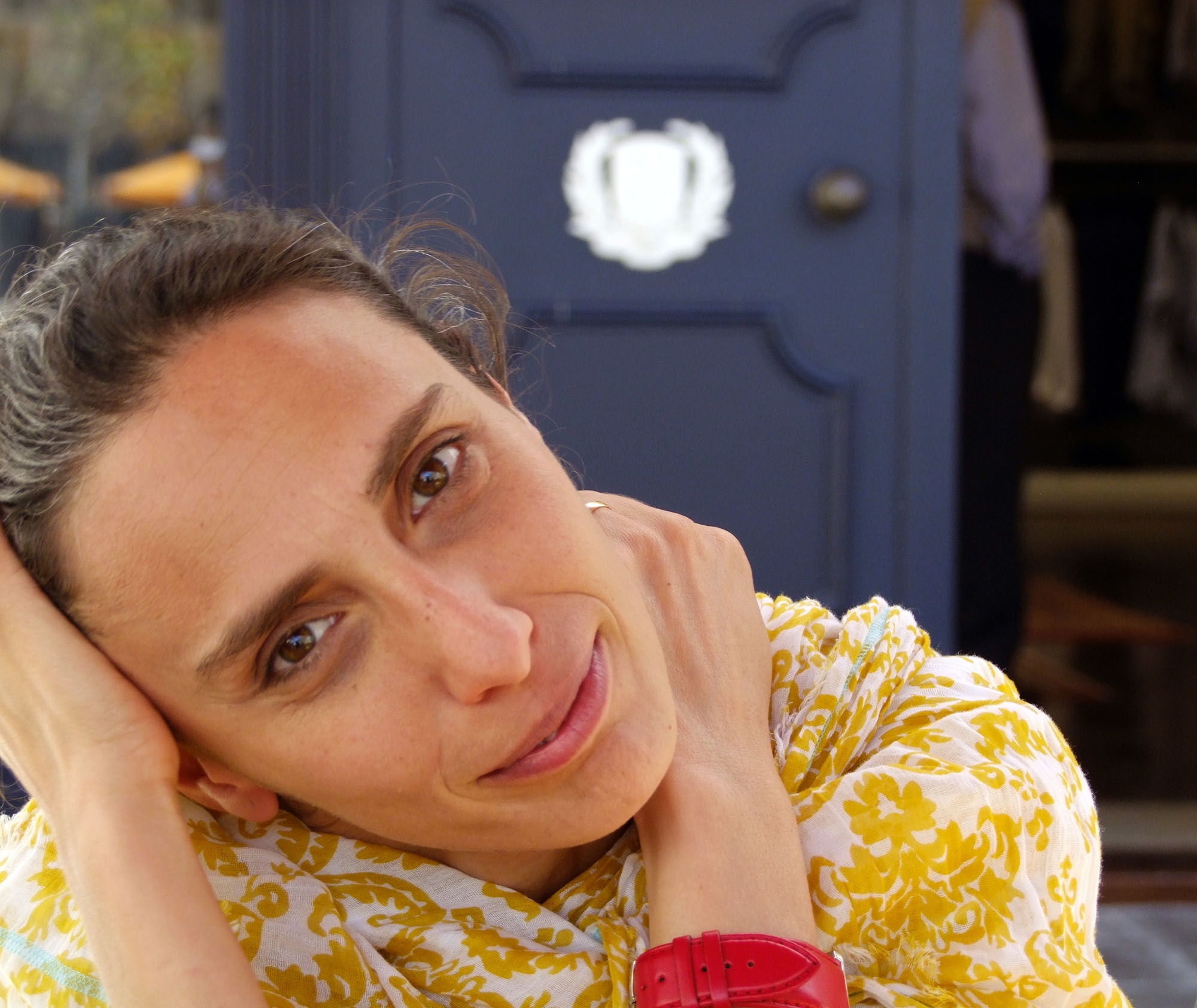
- Born: 1976 (age 48–49) Bormla, Malta
- Occupation: Writer; poet; translator
- Period: 2009-present

Nadia Mifsud (born 1976) is a Maltese poet, novelist and trilingual literary translator living in France. She is Malta's third poet laureate.

== Career ==
Mifsud has written in both Maltese and French. She has cited French poets Apollinaire, Baudelaire, and Rimbaud as influences. She has written on the classic themes of "love and death," as well as women's experiences, "such as mother-daughter relationships and the changes a woman’s body goes through". She has also explored the experience of living abroad, "such as the notion of distance and the feeling of estrangement and homesickness".

She published her first book of poetry, żugraga, in late 2009. The poems in her first book were "short, direct texts" which "[experimented] with typography". By 2016, her poetry had, in her own words, "grown longer and, structurally speaking, more complex," and been translated into English, French, Spanish, Slovenian and Turkish.

In 2017, she published her first and, to date, only novel, Ir-rota daret dawra (kważi) sħiħa. The novel is influenced by conversations she had with a friend, who was dying of cancer while Mifsud was writing the book.

In 2011, she began volunteering with Inizjamed, an association she retained until at least 2023.

In 2022, Mifsud was named Poet laureate of Malta.

== Personal life ==
Mifsud was born in Bormla. As a child, Mifsud's mother encouraged her reading, often rewarding her good behavior with books. She began writing as a child, and wrote poetry in elementary school.

Mifsud left Malta in 1998, when she was 22, and moved to France.

Mifsud married in 2002, but separated from her husband less than a year later.

== Publications ==
=== Poetry ===
==== Own collections ====
- variaciones del silencio (2023, Festival de Los Confines, Honduras — translation by Antoine Cassar of varjazzjonijiet tas-skiet)
- meta tinfetaq il-folla. Ede Books. 2022.
- varjazzjonijiet tas-skiet. Ede Books. 2021.
- kantuniera 'l bogħod. Edizzjoni Skarta. 2015.
- żugraga. 2009.

==== Anthologies ====
- "Call the Sea a Poet: Focus on Malta". Modern Poetry in Translation (2). 2023.
- Leħen il-Malti (various editions, L-Għaqda tal-Malti - Università)
- tgħanniq ieħor. Horizons. 2021.
- Courage ! Dix variations sur le courage et un chant de résistance (in French). Éditions Bruno Doucey. 2020.
- Poetic Potatoes (2018, Inizjamed, Valletta 2018, Leeuwarden 2018)
- Voix Vives - Anthologie Sète (2018, Éditions Bruno Doucey)

==== Online journals and collections ====
- Altazor - Revista electrónica de literatura (February 2024 — translations by Antoine Cassar, curated by Khedija Gadhoum)
- Fragment (11 November 2019 — translations by Antoine Cassar, Albert Gatt, and Nadia Mifsud)

=== Prose ===
==== Short stories ====
- żifna f'xifer irdum. Merlin Publishers. 2021.

==== Novel ====
- Ir-rota daret dawra (kważi) sħiħa. Merlin Publishers. 2017.

==== Anthologies ====
- Scintillas - New Maltese Writing 2. Praspar Press. 2022.
- Leħen il-Malti (various editions, L-Għaqda tal-Malti - Università)

==== Online journals and collections ====
- Culture 360 - ASEF, Made in Bangladesh (19 August 2023)

== Translations ==
=== Poetry ===
- xtaqt li kont merkurju. Inizjamed. 2022.
- transkrit:08 (2016, Kulturfabrik)
- Voix Vives - Anthologie Sète. Éditions Bruno Doucey. 2012.
- Għaraq Xort'Oħra. Inizjamed. 2012.
- Bateau Noir (2011, Edizzjonijiet Emma Delezio)

=== Prose ===
- Le Grand Tour - Autoportrait de l'Europe par ses écrivains (in French). Grasset. 2022.
- Mifsud, Immanuel (2016). Je t'ai vu pleurer (in French). Gallimard. ISBN 978-2-07-253328-0.

== Interviews ==
- Dans tes oreilles (2 April 2020, by Maïté Cussey, Margot Espinasse and Marion Feugère)
- Il faut pouvoir dire les choses (12/13 March 2016 by Thierry Hick)
- The Faraway Nearby - Nadia Mifsud (15 September 2015, by Teodor Reljic)
- Would you like a book with your coffee? (20 October 2009, by Stephanie Fsadni)

== Awards ==
Year	Award	Category	Work	Result	Ref
2014	Merlin Publishers' #abbozz Competition			Won	
2016	National Book Prize	Poetry	kantuniera 'l bogħod	Won	
2017	Amante Buontempo National Poetry Contest			1st, 2nd, and 3rd prizes	
2018	Amante Buontempo National Poetry Contest			Won	
2018	National Book Prize	Prose	Ir-rota daret dawra (kważi) sħiħa	Finalist	
2019	Doreen Micallef National Poetry Contest			Won	
2022	National Book Prize	Prose	varjazzjonijiet tas-skiet)	Won	
2022	National Book Prize	Prose	żifna fuq xifer irdum	Finalist	
