= Albert Marshall (author) =

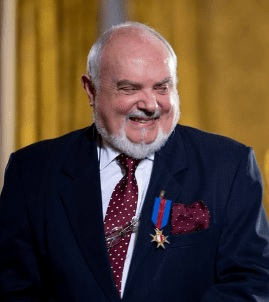
Albert Marshall MOM FRSA

Albert Marshall (born 29 December 1947) is a Maltese–Australian senior leader, board member, executive producer, lecturer, theatre & television director, television presenter, lyricist and author in the Maltese language (he has also published some work in English)

== Biography ==
Marshall attended secondary school at the Archbishops' Seminary in Floriana, Malta. He then studied at the University of Malta and the London Academy of Music and Dramatic Art. He obtained a Master of Arts degree in Communication Studies from Victoria University, Melbourne, Australia.

Marshall distinguished himself as a theatre and television director, playwright, poet, television presenter and executive producer.

Marshall's literary and directorial career began during the 1960s while studying at the University of Malta. During this time he pioneered, and was lauded for, innovation and "new writing" in Maltese theatre. During this time, Marshall was a founding member of the Moviment Qawmien Letterarju.

After a two-year stint living, working and studying in London (where his projects included directing for the Cockpit Theatre and the Hampstead Theatre, and assisting Peter Daubeny at the Aldwych Theatre), Marshall returned to Malta in 1971 and worked in Maltese electronic media as well as in Maltese theatrical arts. In 1979 he was appointed the first Maltese principal of the Manoel Theatre Academy of Dramatic Arts (MTADA). Also in 1979, Marshall directed the original, and highly controversial, television adaptation of Ġużè Diacono's seminal drama Il-Madonna taċ-Ċoqqa, with actress Jane Marshall (Albert Marshall's wife) playing the part of the protagonist, Rita. Between 1971 and 1980, in his post-London period, Marshall's theatre and television direction was distinguished by, and gained renown for, its innovation and creativity.

In January 1981, Marshall emigrated to Australia with wife Jane and their young children. He worked in Australian television, theatre and radio, obtained a master's degree in Communication Studies from Victoria University, and co-founded (with musical director, compatriot and friend Vince Pulo) the Harmonic 65 Culture Club, using it as a vehicle to produce and direct for mainstream Australian media. Marshall was particularly active in the Maltese-Australian community, pushing for the promotion of the Maltese Language in Australia, given its sizeable expatriate population. Marshall was also named chairman of the panel responsible for the Australian national examination in Maltese language. He became the first Maltese person to direct at the Sydney Opera House, directing Mary Spiteri in concert.

On his return to Malta in November 1995, Marshall was engaged by the University of Malta to lecture in Communication Studies and lead the Distance Learning Programme at the Radju tal-Università. He was appointed chief executive officer of the Public Broadcasting Services (PBS) in December 1996. During his tenure as Chief Executive of PBS, Marshall made major changes to operational models and to the programming strategy, and was credited with revamping national public broadcasting. In 1999, Marshall moved to One Productions Limited where he worked as consultant and, eventually, as chief executive officer. During this period, Marshall was appointed as the Media Consultant for Bronville’s Bay Street (entertainment complex) project, and also continued (since 1995) to serve as the official representative of Victoria University in Malta responsible for student and lecturer exchanges, setting up study grants and inter-university initiatives furthering research into intercultural dynamics and ethnicity.

In 2004, Marshall moved to Luxembourg to work as a translator and Language Administrator with the European Commission. He was appointed fonctionnaire of the commission, and returned to Malta in 2009.

In January 2011, Marshall was also appointed Member on Renzo Piano’s Open Theatre Management Board.

In 2021, Marshall was selected as a jury member for the European Prize for Literature.

Marshall's literary works have been published in Australia, Canada, China and Malta.

He currently holds the position of Deputy Chairman of Public Broadcasting Services, as well as the Executive Chair of the Arts Council Malta.

== Honours ==
In December 2018 Marshall was appointed Member of the Order of Merit (MOM) by the President of Malta.

In November 2021 Marshall was appointed Fellow of the Royal Society of Arts (FRSA).

== Personal life ==
Marshall married actress Jane (née Micallef) in 1972, and they have two children, Mark (born 1973) and Kristina (born 1976).

== Publications ==
Marshall has published a wide selection of poems and songs in books and anthologies. His book, Jumping Puddles, was awarded Best Book in the Poetry category by Maltese National Book Council in 2012.

- Dħaħen fl-Imħuħ – published 1967 (which Marshall co-authored with Oliver Friggieri and Ġorġ Borg)
- Rumminiet Jittewbu minn wara s-Sejjieħ – published 1971
- Ir-Rajjes Tad-Dezert - published 1976 - 7-inch Phonograph record
- Poeziji ta' Mħabba – published 1981 (which Marshall co-authored with his brother-in-law, Joe Friggieri, and with Oliver Friggieri)
- Ma Nafekx - published 1984 - 7-inch Phonograph record
- Diaspora: poeziji 1967–1996 – published 1997 ISBN 9-990-96827-6
- Battuti għal Inżul ix-Xemx – published 2010 (which Marshall co-authored with Charles Scerri and Ivan De Battista)
- Jumping Puddles – published 2011 ISBN 978-9-993-20929-4
- Poeziji (1964–2019) – published 2019 ISBN 978-9-995-77591-9
- Sitt Fanali Ċiniżi - published 2020
- Għanjiet Għal Waqt L-Imxija - Compact Disc and Streaming media published 2020, barcode 195448383621
- Źewġ Fares għat-Teatrin Volum 1 – published 2022 ISBN 978-9918-20-152-5
- Erba' Drammi għat-Teatru Volum 2 – published 2022 ISBN 978-9918-20-153-2
- Disa' Opri - published 2023 ISBN 978-9918-20-306-2
