= Oliver Friggieri =

Maltese poet (1947–2020)

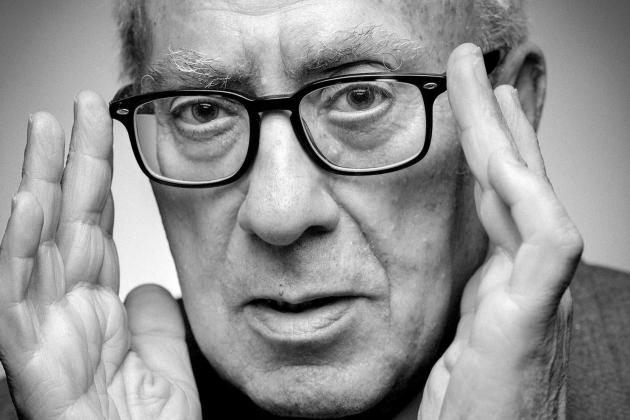
- Born: 27 March 1947; Floriana, Crown Colony of Malta
- Died: 21 November 2020 (aged 73); Malta
- Education: University of Malta; Catholic University of Milan
- Occupations: Literature, Poetry, Philosophy

Oliver Friggieri (27 March 1947 – 21 November 2020) was a Maltese poet, novelist, literary critic, and philosopher. He led the establishment of literary history and criticism in Maltese while teaching at the University of Malta, studying the works of Dun Karm, Rużar Briffa, and others. A prolific writer himself, Friggieri explored new genres to advocate the Maltese language, writing the libretti for the first oratorio and the first cantata in Maltese. His work aimed to promote the Maltese cultural identity, while not shying from criticism: one of his most famous novels, Fil-Parlament Ma Jikbrux Fjuri (No Flowers Grow in Parliament, 1986), attacked the tribalistic divisions of society caused by politics. From philosophy, he was mostly interested in epistemology and existentialism.

== Early life and education ==
Friggieri was born in Floriana in 1947. He completed his secondary education at the Archbishop's Minor Seminary, and was in the Major Seminary until 1967.

He entered the University of Malta in 1964, earning a Bachelor of Arts in Maltese, Italian and Philosophy (1968). He was the first recipient of a master's degree in Maltese literature from the University of Malta (1975). In 1978, he received a Doctorate in Maltese literature and Literary Criticism from the Catholic University of Milan, Italy.

== Career ==
After graduating in 1968, Friggeri taught Maltese and Philosophy in secondary schools. In 1976, he moved to the University of Malta; he was promoted from Assistant Lecturer to Lecturer in 1978, and from Lecturer to associate professor in 1988. That same year, he was chosen to be the Chair of the Department of Maltese language, a position which he held until 2002. He was made a professor in 1990.

Oliver Friggieri statue in Floriana

Friggieri was an advocate of Maltese language and literature in newly independent Malta. He co-founded Malta's Literary Revival Movement (Moviment Qawmien Letterarju) in 1967; he was part of the editorial board (1969–73) of Il-Polz, the movement's periodical, later becoming the editor (1974-1975). He also co-founded the popular children's literary and cultural magazine Is-Sagħtar (1971). In 1971, Friggieri and Paul Mizzi established a publishing house, Klabb Kotba Maltin (Maltese Book Club), which facilitated the publishing of books in Maltese. He became the editor of the Journal of Maltese Studies in 1980. He was also a member of the Association Internationale des Critiques Litteraires of Paris, France. Friggieri published in various genres. As his primary focus was Maltese literature, most of his publications were not of a directly philosophical nature; they included dictionaries of literature, oratorios, cantatas, literary criticism, literary biographies, and anthologies of his own poetry. He wrote the libretti for the first Maltese-language oratorio (Pawlu ta’ Malta, 1989), and cantata (L-Għanja ta’ Malta, 1989); both works were scored by Charles Camilleri. Friggieri also wrote literary analyses of the works of Mikiel Anton Vassalli and Peter Caxaro. His works have been translated into 16 languages, including English, French, German, Italian and Greek.

Friggieri supported the Maltese-language press, publishing articles in L-Orizzont and In-Nazzjon. Besides contributing to these and other local periodicals, Friggieri wrote novels and short stories. Many of these works are of special interest to philosophy, featuring pathos and philosophical reflections. His fiction and poetry were influenced by existentialism. His 1986 novel Fil-Parlament Ma Jikbrux Fjuri, which was also adapted for the stage in 1987, was highly controversial when published due to its unvarnished portrayal of political tribalism in Malta. He also penned a tribute to Karin Grech and Raymond Caruana, casualties of Maltese political violence in the 1980s.

Friggieri was part of the committee that translated EU legal texts into Maltese. In 2008, Friggieri published an autobiography, Fjuri li ma Jinxfux (Flowers Which Never Wither), spanning the years 1955–1990. In addition to his own writings, he translated works from English, Italian, and Latin into Maltese.

Friggieri received the Ġieħ l-Akkademja tal-Malti gold medal in 2016 and won Malta's National Book Prize several times. Prime Minister Joseph Muscat appointed him as Chair of the Foundation for National Festivities in 2013.

Friggieri died on 21 November 2020.

== In popular culture ==
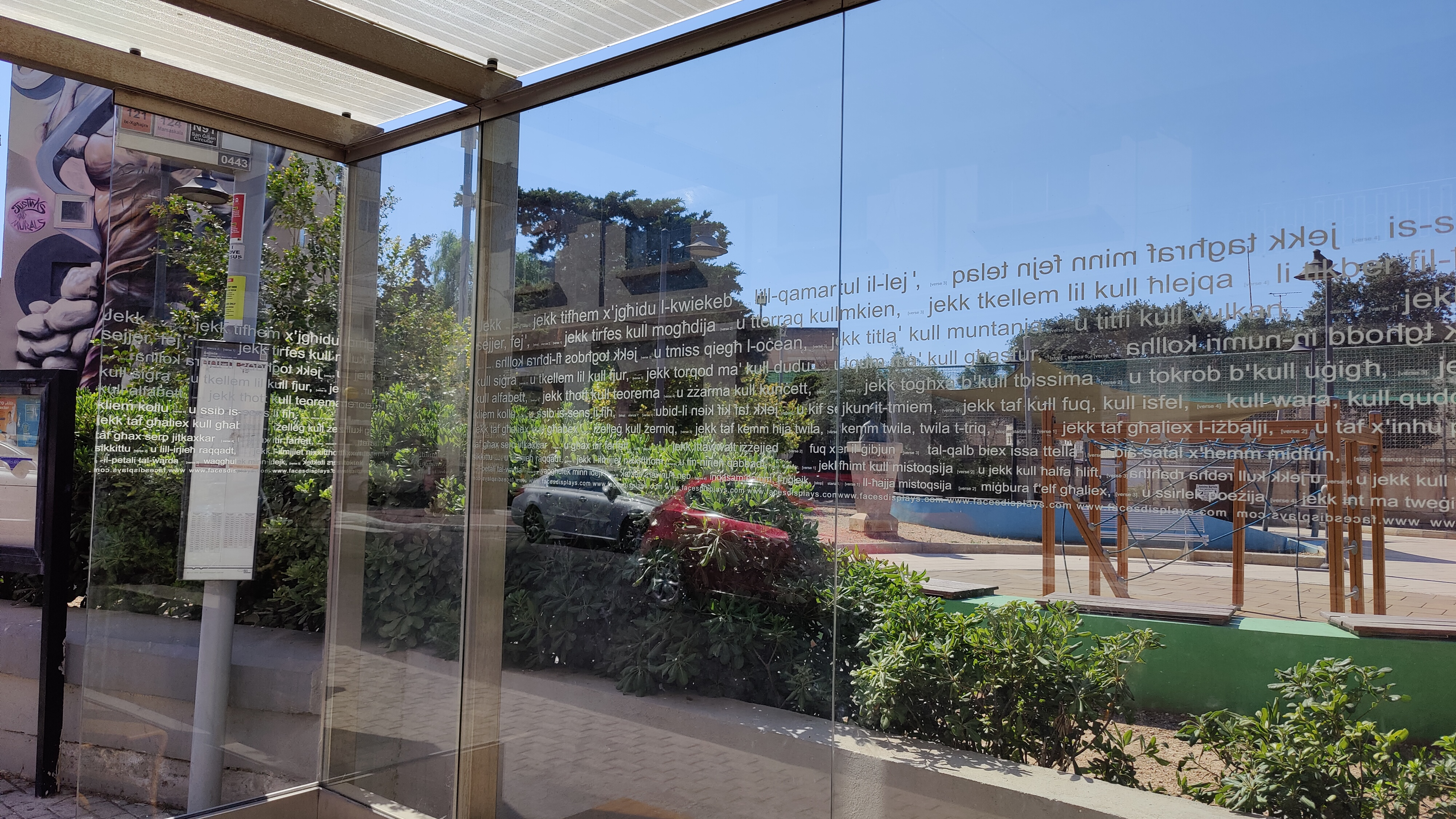
A bus shelter in Malta with text from Friggieri's poem "Jekk"

Verses from Friggieri's poem "Jekk" ("If") can be found printed on some bus shelters around Malta. This led to the poem being known as "the bus stop poem" by the general public.

In 2018, the Maltese band The Travellers released the song "Ilkoll Flimkien". The lyrics of this song contain excerpts of the poem "Jekk".

== Personal life ==
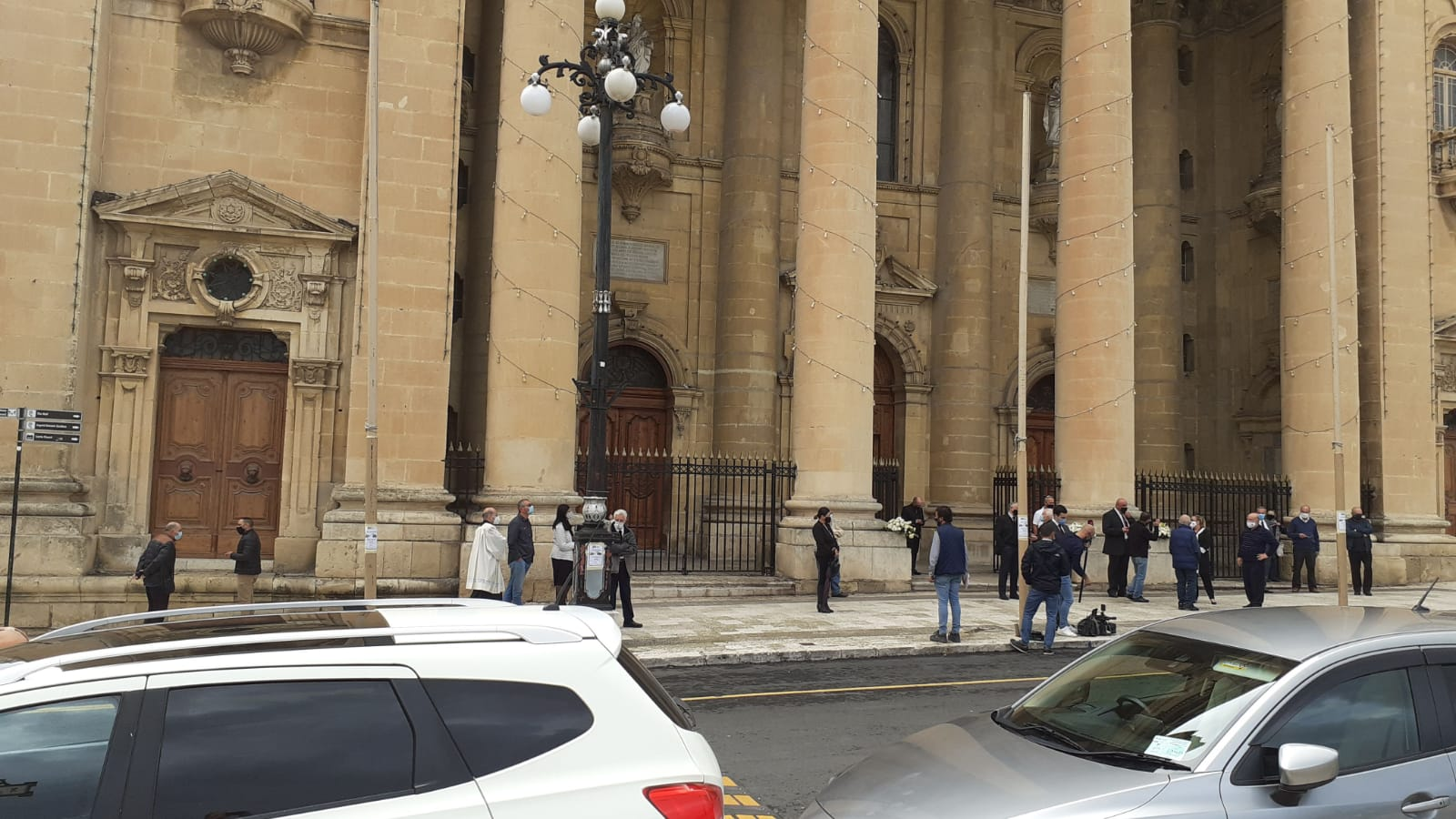
Oliver Friggieri's coffin was at the Floriana Parish Church, before the state funeral mass in Mdina

Friggieri and his wife Eileen had one daughter and two grandchildren. He died on 21 November 2020. A funeral organised by the state was held for him on 25 November, which was declared a national day of mourning.

In December 2020, PN Floriana Minority Leader James Aaron Ellul announced that part of Triq l-Argotti will be named after the late Maltese poet, writer and lecturer Oliver Friggieri. The proposal was put forward by Ellul within the Local Council, in November 2020.

A monument in his honour was erected in his hometown of Floriana and inaugurated in December, 2023. The design of the monument is by the Maltese artist John Grima.

== Honours ==
- Malta: Government Literary Award (1988, 1996, 1997)
- Malta: Member, National Order of Merit (1999)
- Italy: Trieste International Poetry Festival Prize (2002)
- Italy: Officer of the Order of Merit of the Italian Republic (2012)
- Malta: Ġieħ l-Akkademja tal-Malti Gold Medal (2016)

== Partial bibliography ==
Poetry

- 1967 – Dħaħen fl-imħuħ
- 2002 – Sotto l'ombra degli occhi (anthology)

Short stories

- 1979 – Stejjer Għal Qabel Jidlam (Stories Before Nightfall)
- 1991 – Fil-Gżira Taparsi Jikbru l-Fjuri (On The Island Where Flowers Pretend To Grow)

Novels

- 1977 – Il-Gidba (The Lie)
- 1980 – L-Istramb (The Odd Fellow)
- 1986 – Fil-Parlament ma Jikbrux Fjuri (No Flowers Grow in Parliament)
- 1998 – Ġiżimin li Qatt ma Jiftaħ (The Jasmine Which Never Blossoms)
- 2000 – It-Tfal Jiġu bil-Vapuri (Children Come in Ships)
- 2006 – La Jibbnazza Niġi Lura (I Will Return After the Tempest)
- 2008 – Fjuri li ma Jinxfux (Flowers Which Never Wither)
- 2010 – Dik id-Dgħajsa f’Nofs il-Port (That Boat in Mid-Harbour)
- 2013 – Children Come by Ship (English translation of the 2000 novel)
- 2015 – Let Fair Weather Bring Me Home

Dictionary

- Dizzjunarju ta' Termini Letterarji (Dictionary of Literary Terms), 1986 and 1996

Nonfiction and criticism

- Kittieba ta' Żmienna, 1970
- Ir-Ruħ fil-Kelma, 1973
- Rużar Briffa – L-Aħħar Poeżiji u Taħdita Letterarja, 1973
- Introduction to Ġ. A. Vassallo's Il-Ġifen Tork, 1975
- Fl-Għarbiel, 1976
- Il-Kultura Taljana f'Dun Karm, 1976
- Mekkaniżmi Metaforiċi f'Dun Karm, 1978
- Saġġi Kritiċi, 1979
- Storja tal-Letteratura Maltija, I, 1979
- Dun Karm – il-Bniedem fil-Poeta, 1980
- Dun Karm – Il-Poeżiji Miġbura, 1980
- L'esperienza leopardiana di un poeta Maltese: Karmenu Vassallo, 1983
- Rużar Briffa – Il-Poeżiji Miġbura, 1983
- Ġwann Mamo – Il-Kittieb tar-Riforma Soċjali, 1984
- Il-Ħajja ta' Rużar Briffa, 1984
- L-Idea tal-Letteratura, 1986
- Il-Jien u Lil hinn Minnu, 1988
- Dun Karm, 1989
- Saggi sulla letteratura Maltese, 1989
- Il-Kuxjenza Nazzjonali Maltija, 1995
- L-Istudji Kritiċi Miġbura, 1995
- L-Istorja tal-Poeżija Maltija, 2001
- Dun Karm – Le poesie italiane, 2007

Movimenti Letterari e coscienza Romantica Maltese (1800-1921), 1979 Guido Miamo Editore

== See also ==
- Philosophy in Malta
