= Walid Nabhan =

Maltese writer and translator

Walid Nabhan (born 1966 in Amman) is a Maltese writer and translator of Palestinian origin.

Nabhan was born in Amman, Jordan to a family of Palestinian refugees who had fled from their village home of Qbebe near Hebron, Palestine during the Nakba. He arrived in Malta in 1990 as a science student. He studied biomedical sciences at Bristol University, and went on to obtain a master's degree in human rights from the University of Malta.

Nabhan has published two books of short stories in Maltese, and one novel titled L-Eżodu taċ-Ċikonji (2013) which won the Maltese National Prize for Literature in 2014, and the EU Prize for Literature in 2017. He published a collection of poetry in Maltese in 2014. Nabhan has also translated works of Maltese literature into Arabic. His novel was translated in English in 2021.

Walid Nabhan is an integral well established writer in Malta and has written several literature material, including books about Islam and Arab culture, and has taken stands several times against religious fundamentalism.

In January 2016 Walid Nabhan stated that the prayers organized by the Malta Muslim Council, led by Bader Zina, are a form of Islamic fundamentalism. He said that building another mosque is unnecessary and would confirm the split between the Muslim community of the Mariam Al-Batool Mosque and that of the Malta Muslim Council. He also discredited the need of other Muslim places of worship. He further observed that Bader Zina himself, on Times Talk tv show on TVM, had gone as far as silencing a Maltese woman of Muslim faith, namely Simone Zammit Endrich, who had spoken of Islamic facts (religious practice and norms) rather than political Islam.

Following Nabhan's remarks both him and Mr Zina were invited on Disett, a talkshow on TVM; Zina did not turn up, and Nabhan found his car vandalized after the talkshow, which was interpreted as an intimidation.
