= Gioacchino Navarro =

Maltese cleric, archaeologist, linguist and librarian (1748–1813)

Gioacchino Navarro (1748 – 1 January 1813) was a Maltese cleric, archaeologist, linguist and librarian. He is historically significant as the author of the earliest printed poems in the Maltese language, which appeared in François-Emmanuel de Guignard, comte de Saint-Priest's book Malte par un Voyageur Français (1791).

Navarro is mainly known for his It-Tliet Għanjiet bil-Malti (The Three Rhymes in Maltese), which are the earliest known printed poems in the Maltese language. These were first published in 1791 in the book Malte par un Voyageur Français by François-Emmanuel Guignard, comte de Saint-Priest. In Msida, Malta, there is a street named after this poet, called "Triq Gioacchino Navarro".

== Biography ==
Navarro was born in 1748 and served as the conventual chaplain of the Order of Saint John in Malta. Renowned for his expertise in Ancient Greek and Latin inscriptions, he was also fluent in Italian, Arabic and English. In 1770 he succeeded Agius de Soldanis as the second Maltese librarian at the National Library of Malta, a post to which conventual chaplains were appointed by the Prior of the Order. Navarro retained his position through the turbulent years of the French occupation (1798–1800) and into the early British protectorate.

During his tenure, construction of a new library building began in 1796 to plans by Stefano Ittar of Messina, though the collections were not immediately transferred. After Napoleon's arrival in 1798 the National Library was moved to the Forfantone building at the corner of today's Republic Street and St Lucia Street. When French Commissioner Antoine-Étienne de Renaud d'Angély ordered the destruction of the Order's Chancellery records, many documents were rescued through the efforts of Uditore Gaetano Bruno, despite the archive being dispersed across multiple locations. Navarro died on 1 January 1813 and was buried in the church of St James. In 1819 his cousin Vincentia Victoria Debono placed a commemorative plaque in the nave of the sacristy at St John's Co-Cathedral.

== Works ==
In 1778 Navarro published Dissertazione sopra quattro bassi rilievi di marmo bianco, analysing four white marble reliefs. A decade later, when Knight Vittore de Rohan brought five Greek-inscribed marble fragments from Athens to Malta in 1788, Navarro conducted a detailed study and discovered that one bore reference to the island. He presented his findings in 1789 as Marmo Greco-Melitense, ossia interpretazione d’una inedita precevole Greca iscrizione, a work later commended by the Marquis Barbaro di San Giorgio.

== Literary contribution ==
Navarro's most enduring legacy lies in his adaptation of three Maltese folk songs for inclusion in comte de Saint-Priest's Malte par un Voyageur Français (1791). Collected under the title Tliet għanjiet bil Malti (Three songs in Maltese), these poems—beginning with Min jitma fit-Tama, Smajt l-inti tarbit l-Imħabba and Għadira li tixrob minnha—are generally regarded as the earliest printed examples of Maltese poetry. Originally performed with music, the verses were republished with English translations by Pierre-Marie-Louis de Boisgelin de Kerdu in 1804. In 1822 the German scholar Gustav Parthey recorded the melody for two of the poems as Canzonetta Maltese in his anthology of Italian and Sicilian melodies.

== Historical significance ==
Navarro's printed versions of these folk songs mark a milestone in Maltese literary history and provide key evidence of late 18th-century orthography. His transcription employed a mixed script of twelve Arabic letters supplemented by characters from the Italian alphabet to aid readers unfamiliar with Arabic. Although Saint-Priest himself dismissed the verses as derivative of Italian style, scholars and visitors alike recorded and discussed them.
