= Ninu Cremona =

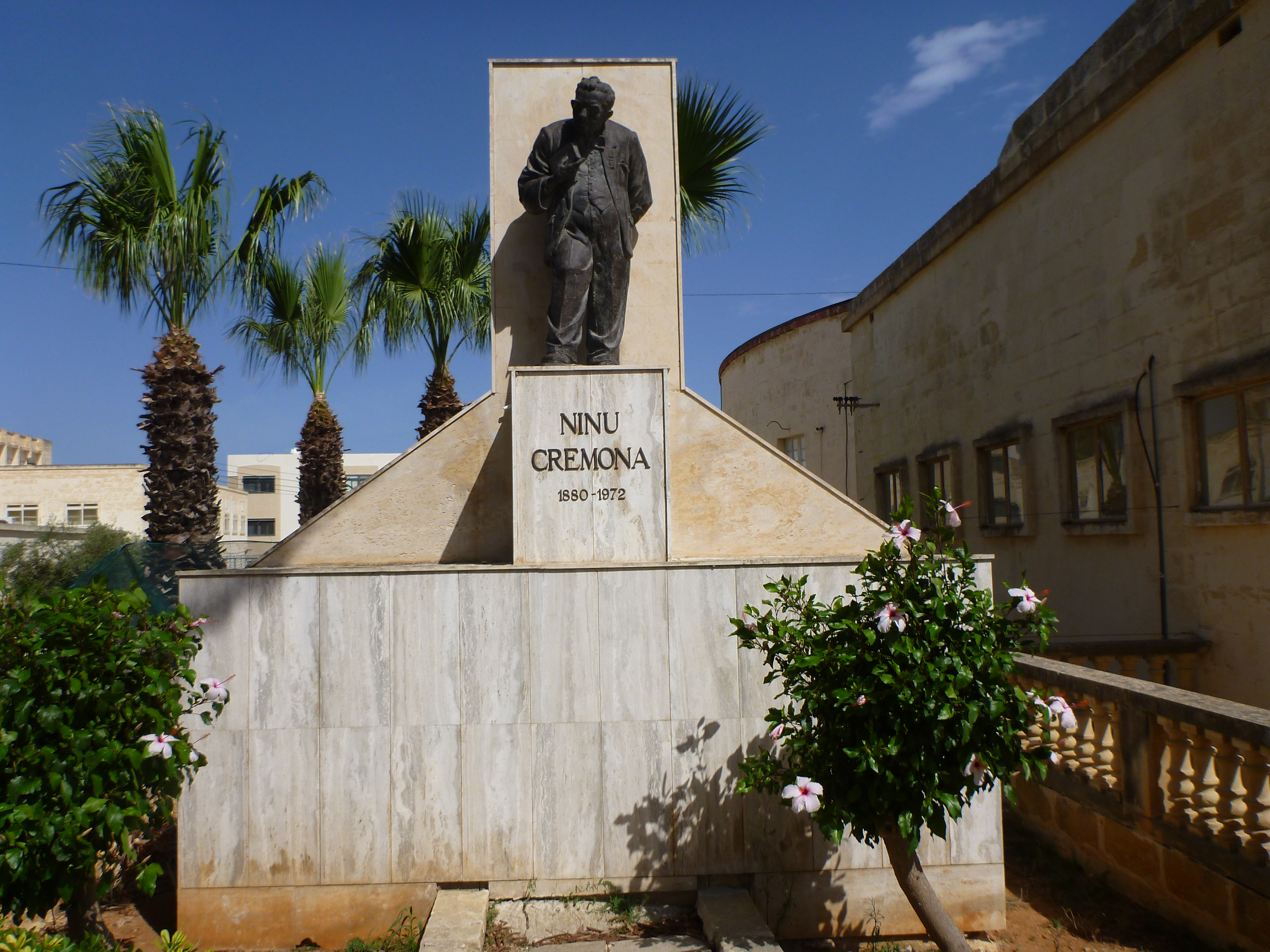
Statue of Ninu Cremona in Victoria

Ninu "Anthony" Cremona (May 27, 1880 – January 4, 1972), colloquially known as Is-Sur Nin, was a Maltese writer and health inspector.

== Early life ==
Ninu Cremona was born on May 27, 1880, in Victoria, Gozo, to Feliċ, a notary, and Margaret née Pace. His father died when Ninu was aged three years old and in 1885, he was sent to live with his uncle in Tunis where he attended the school of the Christian Brothers and later on at St Charles College.

In 1898, he returned to Malta where he continued his studies at the Seminary in Gozo. There he met with Dun Karm Psaila (Monsignor Carmelo Psaila, the Maltese national poet). In 1900, he was employed as a clerk with the government and four years later was appointed as Sanitary Inspector after having attended for a course in the Ashton School of Hygiene at the University of Liverpool. In 1928 he became the editor responsible for all the government translations and publications.

== Academic achievements ==
He used also to teach Maltese in evening classes while in 1936 he became a Master teaching Maltese at the Lyceum. During the years he was also an examiner of the Maltese Language at the Royal University of Malta.

Ninu Cremona was one of the founders of the Għaqda tal-Kittieba tal-Malti (the Maltese Writers Society), now known as the Akkademja tal-Malti (The Maltese Academy). Throughout his life he kept the position of Vice-President and was also the editor of Il-Malti, the Writers Society magazine. His biggest contribution to the Maltese language was the formulation of the Maltese orthography, a very important task, in which he had the help of Ġanni Vassallo. His study is still valid in modern times and could be found in the booklet Tagħrif fuq il-Kitba Maltija (Information about the Maltese Grammar), which was published for the first time in 1924.

He was a prolific writer. He was very fond of drama, and his best work is without any doubt Il-Fidwa tal-Bdiewa (The Farmers' Liberation) a play based on the classical Greek structure.

== Research work ==
He wrote a number of biographies, but the principal one used by other researchers to expand upon is Mikiel Anton Vassalli u Żminijietu (1937), which was translated by May Butcher, Vassalli and his times in 1940. Among other biographies, Rużar Briffa published in Il-Malti of June 1963, the year in which the poet died gives an interesting insight into the establishment of L-Għaqda tal-Malti (Università) which had been established by Rużar Briffa and Ġużè Bonnici in 1931.

== Honours ==
In 1964 he received the gold medal Ġużè Muscat Azzopardi and on the June 4, 1960 was honoured by the Royal University of Malta with the degree D.Litt. Honoris Causa in Literature for his great contribution in the sphere of literature, grammar and science of the Maltese language. On September 21, 1969 he was awarded the Silver Medal of Merit by the Confederation of Civic Councils. On the 40th anniversary of his death, an exhibition of his life and work was organised in the Banca Giuratale.

== Last days ==
He spent his last few months in the small island of Gozo where he had been born. He died on 4 January 1972 aged 91 years. All the Maltese newspapers and many magazines honoured him by detailed appreciations of his works, amongst which was the specialised Leħen il-Malti issue number 18 in 1973.
