= Francis Ebejer =

Maltese writer

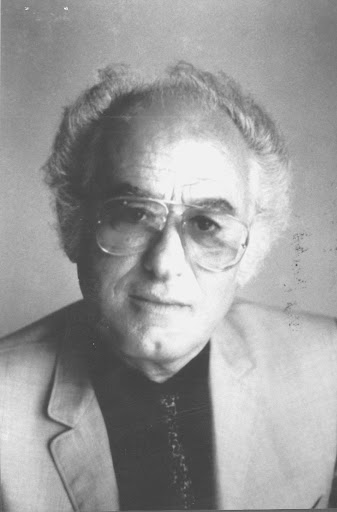
- Francis Ebejer
- Born: 28 August 1925
- Died: 10 June 1993 (aged 67)
- Occupations: Dramatist; Novelist; Playwright
- Writing career
- Language: Maltese
- Notable works: Il-Vaganzi tas-Sajf (1962); Boulevard (1964); Menz (1967); Requiem For A Malta Fascist (1980); Il-Ħadd fuq il-Bejt (1964)
- Notable awards: Manoel Theatre Award (1962); Malta Literary Award; La Médaille d’Honneur de la Ville d’Avignon (1985)

Francis Ebejer (28 August 1925, Dingli — 10 June 1993, St Julian's) was a Maltese dramatist, novelist and playwright. He is regarded as one of the most influential writers in Maltese history, inspiring generations of writers beyond his death. Some of his most notable works include Il-Vaganzi tas-Sajf (1962), Boulevard (1964), Menz (1967), Requiem For A Malta Fascist (1980), Il-Ħadd fuq il-Bejt (1964).

== Biography ==
Ebejer studied medicine at the University of Malta between 1942 and 1943 before abandoning the course to work as an English-Italian interpreter with the 8th Army of the British Forces in Tripolitania, North Africa (1943–44). After the war he became a teacher in England. Upon completion of St Mary's Training College, Strawberry Hill, Twickenham (1948–50), he was appointed a primary school headmaster in Malta, a post he held till 1977.

Ebejer wrote seven full-length novels in English, and another one in Maltese, all published. His final novel, The Maltese Baron and I Lucian was published in 2002, nine years after the author's death. Other novels by Ebejer include A Wreath of Maltese Innocents (1958), Wild Spell of Summer (1968), In the Eye of the Sun (1969), Come Again in Spring: Requiem for a Malta Fascist (1980), and Leap of Malta Dolphins (1982). He wrote the Maltese rumanzett entitled Il-Ħarsa ta' Rużann. Several university students have written their theses for laureateships and doctorates in English on his works.

Ebejer was the leading Maltese dramatist of the second half of the 20th century, having written over fifty plays, the majority in Maltese, for the stage, television and radio, several of them recipients of literary and dramatic awards. In the 1950s he wrote mostly for the radio, the sixties and the seventies saw the more mature Ebejer producing most of his stage plays for Malta's National Theatre, the Manoel Theatre in Valletta.

Ebejer had three children: Frank, Mary Jane and, later, Damian. Damian went on to become an artistic and a poet. Frank died in a road accident in Hampshire in 1972 at the age of twenty-two. Around this time he wrote Vum-Barala-Zungaré (1973), a play often noted for its critical view of divine providence, although Ebejer consistently rejected claims that he had lost his faith. In later years, after visiting his brother, a bishop in Brazil, he returned to a practising Catholic. He subsequently contributed weekly articles to a local newspaper, in which he argued for the authenticity of the Turin Shroud.

On 10 June 1993, Francis Ebejer died at the age of 67. He passed away at his home in Swieqi. His funeral in Ħad-Dingli was attended by members of Parliament, actors, theatre producers and publishers. He is buried in the Ħad-Dingli cemetery.

== Novels ==
Ebejer wrote in both Maltese and English. After one of his short stories was broadcast on the BBC, his first book, A Wreath for the Innocent, was published in London in 1958. Two further books appeared in London: Evil of the King Cockroach (1960) and In the Eye of the Sun (1969).

His other novels include Wild Spell of Summer (1968), Come Again in Spring: Requiem for a Malta Fascist (1980), and Leap of Malta Dolphins (1982). His final novel, The Malta Baron and I Lucian, was published posthumously in 2002, nine years after Ebejer’s death. The novel has been described as a companion work to Requiem for a Malta Fascist.

== Playwright and Director ==
Upon his return to Malta in the early 1960s, Ebejer found the Manoel Theatre in Valletta undergoing renovation after having been transferred back to government ownership. He subsequently won a drama competition organised by the theatre with Il-Vaganzi tas-Sajf. During rehearsals for the work, the director fell ill and Ebejer assumed directorial responsibility.

Ebejer’s plays introduced themes of introspection concerning Maltese society, expressed through a stylistic approach noted for its linguistic precision. His stage direction, along with his writing, adopted techniques that were new to Maltese theatre at the time. His plays Vaganzi tas-Sajf (1962), Boulevard (1964) and Menz (1967) achieved notable success and marked a shift toward drama with a more intellectual focus in the Maltese theatrical landscape. His work Id-Dar tas-Soru was later adapted into a series for Maltese television; while regarded by some viewers as demanding, it nonetheless attracted a wide audience.

His three great works, Vaganzi tas-Sajf (1962, Summer holidays), Boulevard (1964), and Menz (1967) were a great success. Vaganzi tas-Sajf, a play in three Acts, is one of his best known dramas, and has been translated into French, Italian and German, and published respectively in France, Italy, and Malta. Menz was performed in Spain, Tokyo and Venice.

Ebejer experimented much with the theatre. In Boulevard, for example, he experiments with the idea of the absurd, using language to smash the stability of tradition. Another concept he introduced in Malta is the thesis play. In Menz, for instance, he discusses the usefulness of individual freedom within a social system that imposes rigidity; in Vaganzi tas-Sajf man has to look for internal peace within the bounds of his own experience and maturity; and in L-Imwarrbin (1973, The Cliffhangers) he sets the past in confrontation with the present to reveal the workings of the individual conscience and makes use of the play-within-a-play technique to retain the link with reality.

He was quoted as saying, "I was conscious of only one thing. There had been so many plays, light farces comedies dealing with Maltese that were anything but intelligent or cultured. That's why my first play is choked full, perhaps too much of ideas. I really wanted to show that Maltese actors on stage can speak as literally as any."

His work explored universal themes. Although he expressed an interest in Maltese identity, he avoided presenting it in generalised terms, instead acknowledging the complexity and contradictions inherent in human experience. By addressing issues that extend beyond cultural contexts specific to a certain point in time, his writing has maintained a broad cultural relevance. When reflecting upon Francis Ebejer's work, Prof. Arthur Pollard (University of Hull) said, "Ebejer never suggests the merely occasional; he seeks to endow the local reality with universal significance."

== Awards and Recognition ==
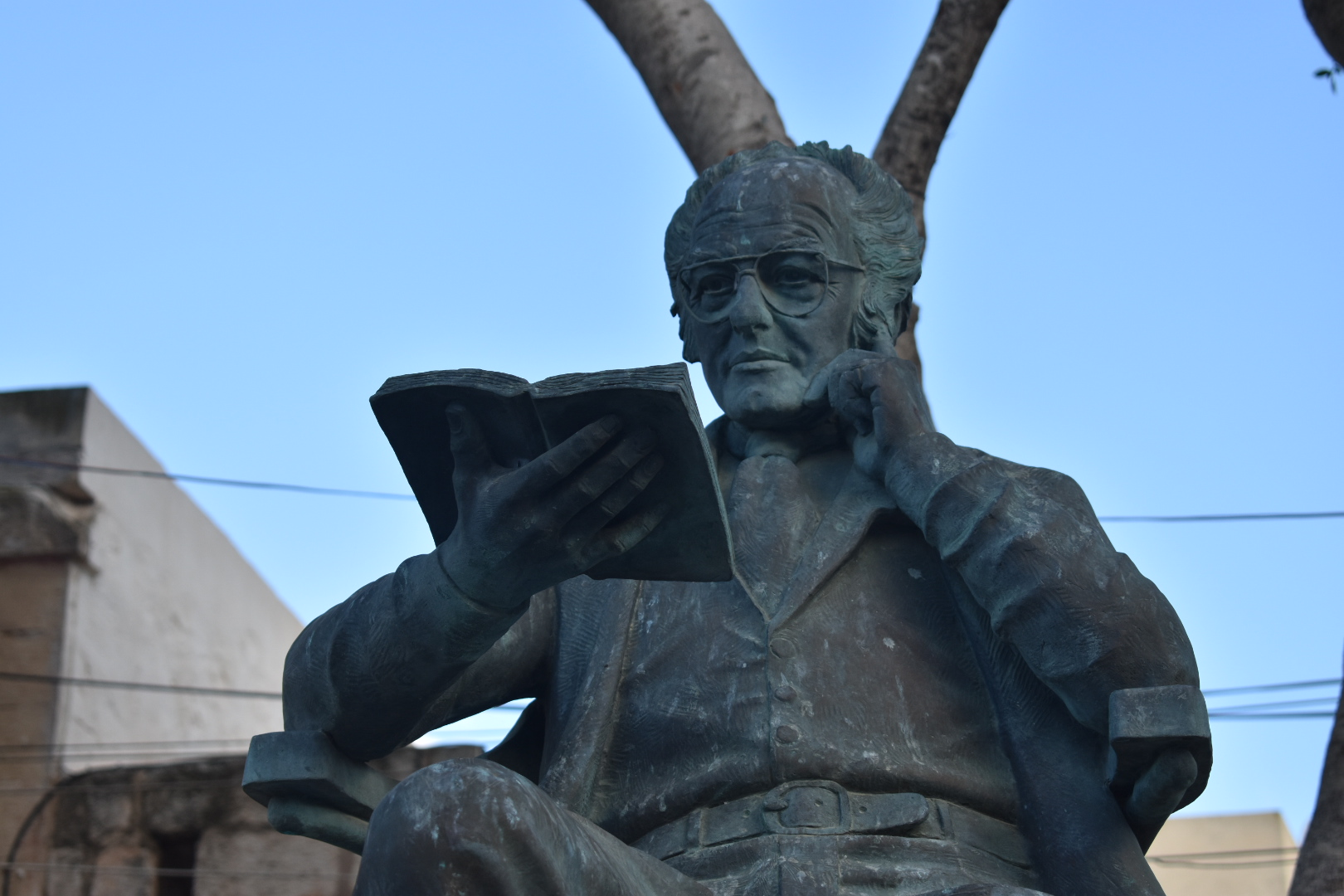
Monument of Francis Ebejer in Dingli

Ebejer received many awards and titles in Malta and abroad for his literary works. Beyond the Manoel Theatre award he received in 1962, Ebejer was four times a recipient of the Malta Literary Award. He was given the Cheyney Award in the United States for his work as producer, the Phoenicia Trophy for Culture between 1982 and 1985, and the Città di Valletta award in 1989. For the French translation of one of his plays, he was presented with the Medaille d’Honneur de la Ville d’Avignon.

Ebejer’s works have been translated into Italian, French, German, Spanish, Polish, Japanese and Flemish. He also wrote children’s books in English and Maltese, which were translated into German. Some of his work was published in New York between 1980 and 1992.

In 1961 Ebejer became a Fellow of the English Centre of P.E.N. International. Between 1961 and 1962 he became a Fulbright Scholar (USA). He also sat on the council of the Akkademja tal-Malti, served as Honorary President of the Moviment Letterarju Malti, and held honorary membership of the Accademie de Vaucluse in France. In 1985, the Municipality and University of the French city of Avignon awarded him La Medaille d'Honneur de la Ville d'Avignon in recognition of his contribution to literature and the theatre.

In his home town of Ħad-Dingli, a monument dedicated to him was installed in 1999. It was designed by Anton Agius, who had earlier sculpted a bust of the writer.

Studio Francis Ebejer is an initiative organised by Teatru Malta, Teatru Manoel and Spazju Kreattiv in collaboration with Arts Council Malta. The programme invites submissions from scriptwriters for the development of theatre and radio plays, primarily in the Maltese language. It provides participants with training, research support and structured feedback, enabling them to refine scripts and theatrical projects through workshops, with the aim of improving their artistic quality.

== A Gentleman from Malta ==
Following his death, a Maltese–Austrian production team created a documentary about his life. The film was produced on a micro-budget of Lm500, approximately equivalent to €1,200, and was made by a two-person technical crew supplied by the Broadcasting Authority of Malta. The involvement of the Austrian co-producer was linked to her access to rare and previously unused footage of Ebejer, which had been located in 1996 among archival material stored in a private residence near Vienna.

Ebejer encountered many personal mishaps and sufferings in his life, which some scholars feel were an inspiration for his works. He was known to be a very private person, even to his closest friends. However, in 1992 and one year before his death, he uncharacteristically allowed a TV camera into his home for the filming of a failed foreign docudrama. The unique footage taken of Ebejer was kept unused for a number of years until it was utilised in "A Gentleman from Malta."

This documentary examined his personal life and how it influenced his philosophy in approaching his work. They interviewed many of contemporaries including Karmen Azzopardi, Dr Paul Xuereb, Charles Thake and Josephine Zammit Cordina, as well as his friends and son, Damian Ebejer.

In 1998, it won the Best Documentary of the Year in the MBA Programme Awards.
