= Naked as Water =

Book of poems by Mario Azzopardi

Naked as Water, by Mario Azzopardi, is a book of poems written originally in Maltese. Mario Azzopardi (born 1944) should not be confused with Mario Philip Azzopardi (who has made a career in film-making in Canada). The former Azzopardi is a poet, short story writer, university lecturer and cultural columnist and is the incumbent principal of the Malta Drama Centre. He made his first mark as a leading, radical poet in the nineteen-sixties. Naked as Water is a collection of verse by Mario Azzopardi, translated by Professor Grazio Falzon.

== Summary ==
The poems in this collection have been arranged into five sections:

- Nocturnes and Visions — poems of angst, nightmares, scenes from the village and city.
- Anima — poems about women.
- The Seven-Headed Dragon — poems about the larger-than-life poet and his quest.
- Equinox — poems on religious themes.
- Tombstone With No Epitaph — abstract poems, poems on geometric relationships, poems about poetry itself.

== Reviews ==
"... Azzopardi's poems speak forcefully about Malta's history and independence as a culture."

"In Malta the catchphrase associated with Mario Azzopardi -- poet, teacher of literature and drama producer -- is enfant terrible."

"Naked As Water is a very exotic volume... The poems themselves are a studied primitivism filled with the primal reality of sea, sun and moon, but always with a sophisticated awareness of the 'isms' of twentieth-century art and literature. This is a very valuable book out of one last minority world of Europe that demands its place on the literary map."

== Editions ==
- Translated from the Maltese, and with an Introduction and Afterword by Grazio Falzon; illustrations by Thomas M. Cassidy. Grand Terrace, CA: Xenos Books. ISBN 1-879378-11-6 (paper), xiii + 178 p.
