= Simone Inguanez =

Maltese author and poet (born 1971)

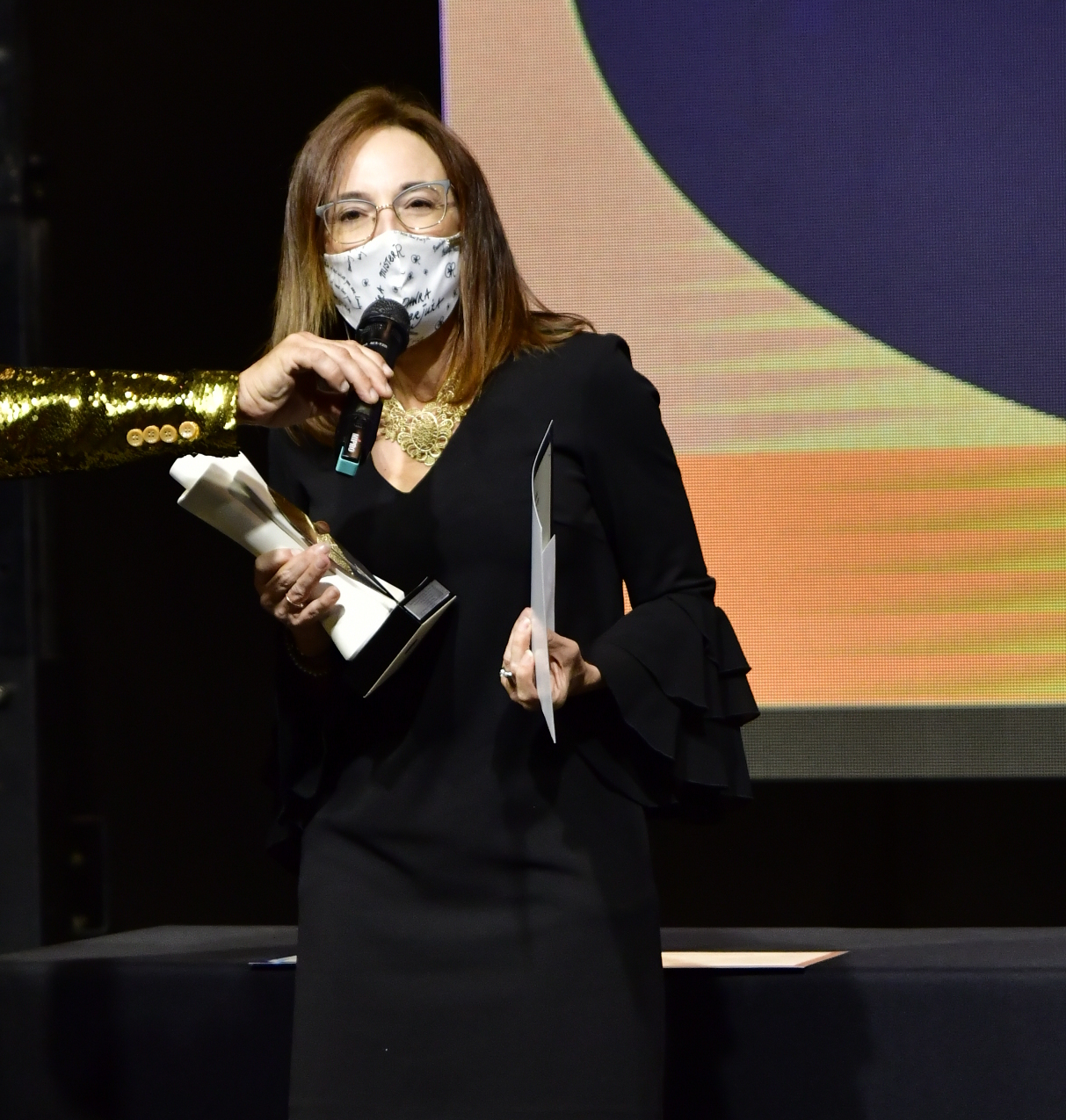

Simone Inguanez (born 3 December 1971) is a Maltese author and poet. She is the eldest of 3 siblings. Born in Bormla, she went on to live with her family in Santa Lucija. She now lives in Kalkara.

She qualified from the University of Malta, with a degree in law, forensics and psychology.

In 2005 she published her book Ftit Mara, Ftit Tifla. Inguanez forms part of a number of literary groups and societies, and is well known in the local literary sphere.

She currently holds the position of Diversity and Communities Associate on the Arts Council Malta board.

== Publications ==
- Water, Earth, Fire and I, 2005
- Ftit Mara, Ftit Tifla, 2005
