= Akkademja tal-Malti =

Maltese literary society

Maltese Academy
- Akkademja tal-Malti
- Founded: 1920
- Purpose: Literary society of Malta
- Formerly called: L-Għaqda tal-Kittieba tal-Malti

The Akkademja tal-Malti (English: Maltese Academy) is a literary society in Malta, focused on Maltese literature, language, and linguistics. Until 2005, it was the prime regulatory body responsible for the Maltese language, when the Maltese government created the government-funded National Council for the Maltese Language. The academy continues to work with the National Council and similar organizations to promote the Maltese language.

Initially known as L-Għaqda tal-Kittieba tal-Malti (English: Association of Writers of Maltese), its earliest activities date back to 1920, led by literary figures including Dun Karm, Ġużè Muscat Azzopardi and Ninu Cremona, it spearheaded the cause of the Maltese language. The Akkademja was mainly responsible for major linguistic and literary development of the Maltese language during the past century, developing linguistic academic initiatives which culminated in the national recognition of a standard written Maltese.

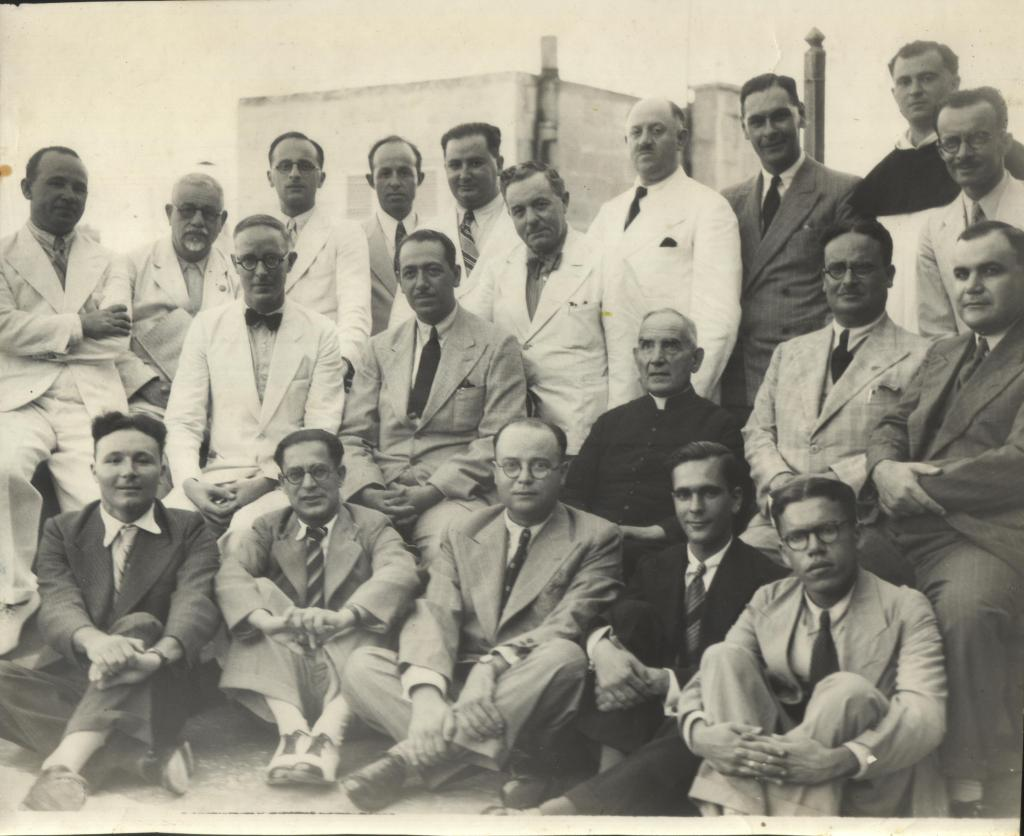
The Maltese Writers' Association (L-Għaqda tal-Kittieba tal-Malti) Osborne Hotel, 30.08.1938

In 2005, the National Council for the Maltese Language was set up through a law by the Maltese Parliament. This council is currently the main regulatory body of the Maltese language, replacing the L-Akkademja tal-Malti in that role.
