= Clare Azzopardi =

Maltese author (born 1977)

- Azzopardi in 2022
- Born: July 5, 1977 (age 49); St. Julian's, Malta
- Education: University of Sheffield (MA)
- Occupation: Author

Clare Azzopardi (born 5 July 1977) is a Maltese author who writes for both adults and younger readers. She has published many plays and books. One of which has recently been turned into a film.

== Life ==
Born in St. Julian's, Malta, she eventually went on to study at the University of Malta and then received a master's degree in literacy from the University of Sheffield.

== Works ==
Azzopardi’s poetry and short stories, written in Maltese, have appeared in various anthologies. Her work has appeared in translation in various literary periodicals, including In Focus, Transcript, Words without Borders, West 47, Lettre International (Hungary) and Kulturas Forms.

In 2005, Azzopardi published Others, Across, two short stories translated into English, and, in 2006, a collection of short stories in Maltese, Il-Linja l-Ħadra ("The Green Line"). She has also written plays, including In-Nisa Jafu Kif, Pretty Lisa and L-Interdett Taħt is-Sodda which was published in French (Éditions Théatrales) and in Arabic (I-ACT) . She has participated in various literary festivals including the Jaipur Literature Festival and the vRIsak festival in Rijeka.

== List of publications ==
=== Children ===
- Meta l-Milied ma Ġiex
- Il-Fjuri Qarrieqa
- Ġużeppina
- Hemm dal-post telqulu l-kuluri
- Mingu
- Il-Qtates ta' max-xatt
- Is-Sinjura Klaws
- Senduq Kuluri/Buffuri
- Senduq Riżorsi għall-Għalliema
- Esperimenti tax-xjenza (100 attivita)
- Kalejdoskopju 3-6
- 1.MT, 2.MT, 3.MT, 4.MT
- Terramaxka
- Tikka Malti 1a,1b, 2a, 2b, 3a, 3b, 4a, 4b
- Tikka Qari (series)

=== Poetry and prose for adults ===
- Others, across
- Il-Linja l-Ħadra
- Din Mhix Tazza
- Klijenti Antipatici u Kapuccini Kesħin
- Għaraq Xort'Oħra
- Kulħadd ħalla isem warajh
- L-Art tal-Kliem
- Castillo
- Din Gżira Niexfa

=== Translations ===
- Le Loup Qui Voulait Changer de Couleur
- Le Loup Qui ne Voulait Plus Marcher
- Berlingot est un Superhéros
- Zafo Le Petit Pirate
- Séraphin, Le Prince Des Dauphins
- Rosetta Banana N'est Pas Craca
- Crocky Le Crocodile A Mal Aux Dents
- Camille Veut Une Nouvelle Famille
- Les Bêtises de Manon
- Manon est Malade
- Le Dent de Manon
- L'Anniversaire de Manon
- Manon s'Habille Toute Seule
- La Grande Fabrique Des Mots
- Le Loup qui Avait Peur De Son Ombre
- Le Loup Qui S'amait Beaucoup Trop
- Le Loup Qui Decouvrait Le Pays Des Contes
- Le Loup Qui Encûetait au Musée
- P'tit loup va sur le pot
- P'tit loup n'aime que les pâtes

=== Theatre ===
- L-Esperimenti ta' Fiona
- L-Interdett taħt is-Sodda
- In-Nisa Maltin Jafu Kif
- Pretty Lisa

== Awards ==
In 2011 and 2012 she was nominated for the Astrid Lindgren Memorial Award in 2011 and 2012. In 2015 and 2016 her children's books Lupu Lupettu Kull Kulur and Mingu received the Terramaxka Book Prize.

She is also the recipient of 10 National Book Prize for Literature awards: Il-Linja l-Ħadra (2006), L-Interdett taħt is-Sodda (2012), Kulħadd ħalla isem warajh (2015), Il-Każ Kważi Kollu tal-Aħwa De Molizz (2010), Ir-Re Pankrazju jagħlaq mitt sena (2010), Jake Cassar (2015), Meta l-Milied ma Ġiex (2010), Kidane (2012), Il-Qtates ta' max-Xatt (2016) and Teresa (2017).

In 2021, Azzoppardi won a Terramaxka Prize for best translated work, for the book Ors fl-Ispazju.
