= Immanuel Mifsud =

Maltese writer and poet (born 1967)

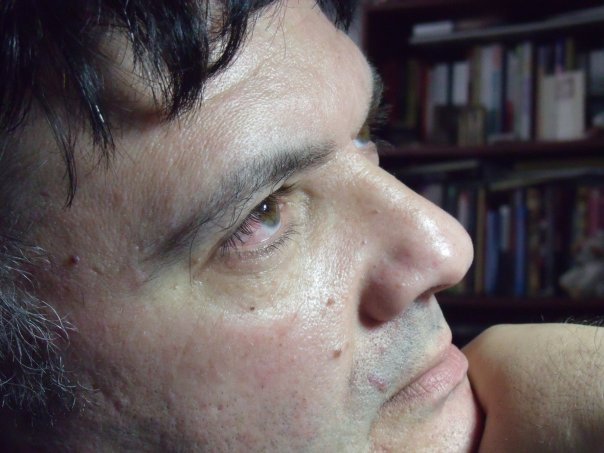
- Immanuel Mifsud
- Born: September 12, 1967 (age 58) Paola, Malta
- Education: University of Malta (PhD, 2012)
- Notable awards: 2011 European Union Prize for Literature

Immanuel Mifsud (born September 12, 1967, Paola) is a Maltese writer of poetry and prose. He was for a time involved in research theatre. He has written novels, short story and poetry collections, and also books for children.

In 2011, he became the first Maltese writer to win the European Union Prize for Literature.

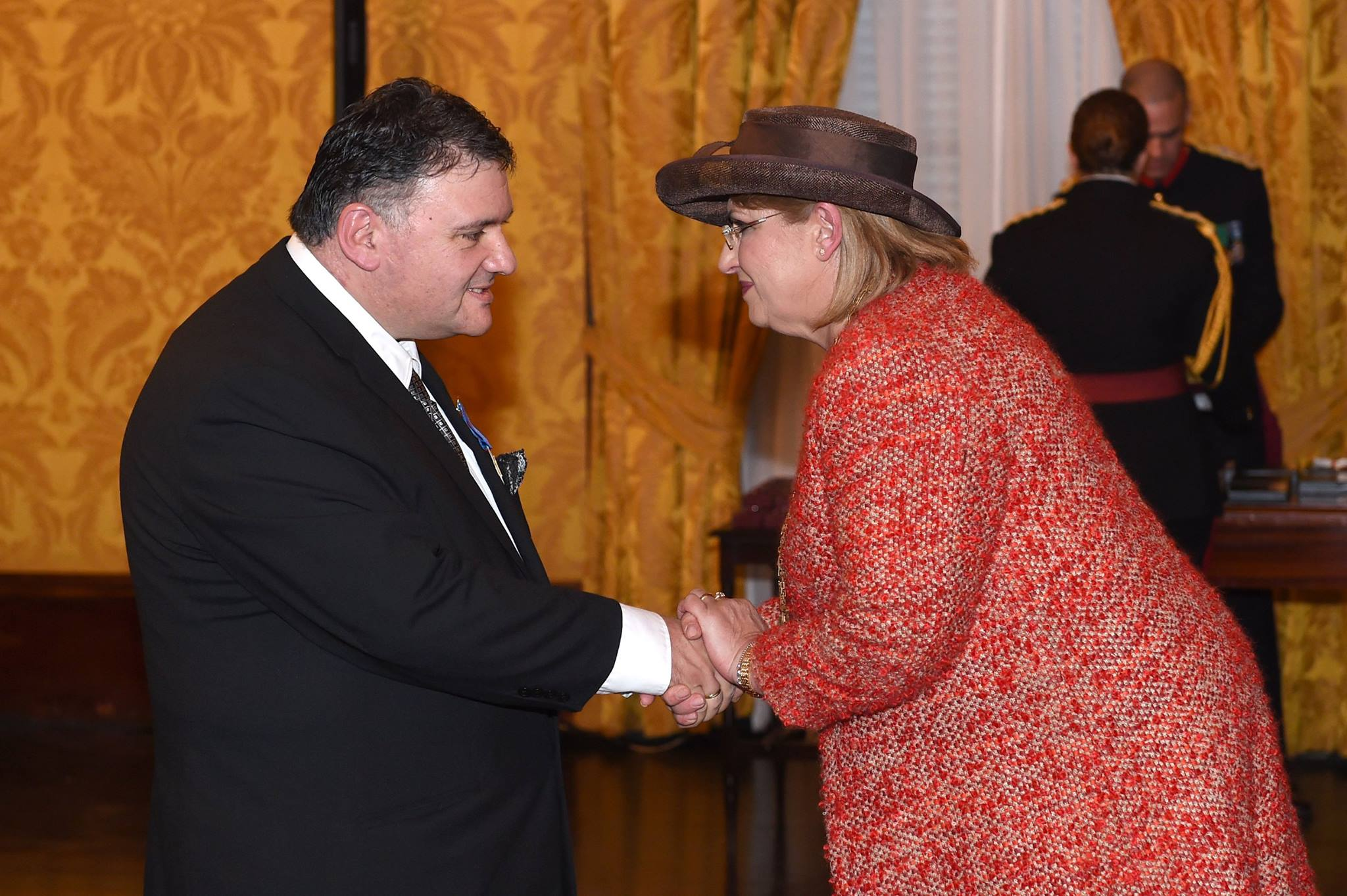
HE Marie Louise Coleiro Preca, President of the Republic of Malta, appointing Immanuel Mifsud Member of the Order of Merit, 13 December 2014

In 2014, he was appointed Member of the Order of Merit of the Republic of Malta.

Mifsud became the first Maltese writer to be hosted at the Library of Congress, Washington, D.C., where on February 16, 2017, he gave a reading and was interviewed during a special event. In the same year he was commissioned to write a poem for Commonwealth Day; Mifsud read "The Book" during Commonwealth Day Celebration at Westminster Abbey on March 13.

Mifsud studied at the University of Malta where he was given a doctorate in literature in 2012. He teaches literature and literary theory at the same university.

== Prose ==
1991: Stejjer ta' Nies Koroh (Stories of Ugly People)
1993: Il-Ktieb tas-Sibt Filgħaxija (Stories for Saturday Night)
1999: Il-Ktieb tal-Maħbubin Midruba (The Book of Maimed Lovers)
2002: L-Istejjer Strambi ta' Sara Sue Sammut (Sara Sue Sammut's Strange Stories)
2005: Kimika (Chemistry)
2006: Happy Weekend (in English)
2008: Stejjer li ma kellhomx jinkitbu (Forbidden Tales)
2010: Fl-Isem tal-Missier (u tal-Iben) (In the Name of the Father (and of the Son))
2014: Jutta Heim
2016: Fid-Dlam tal-Lejl Ħarisna (In the Dark Night We Looked)
2019: L-Aqwa Żmien

== Poetry ==
1998: Fid-Dar ta' Clara (At Clara's)
2001: Il-Ktieb tar-Riħ u l-Fjuri (The Book of the Wind and Flowers)
2004: Polska-Slovensko (bilingual, Maltese-English)
2005: km (bilingual, Maltese-English)
2005: Confidential Reports (in English)
2007: Poland Pictures (in English)
2013: Penelopi Tistenna (Penelope Waits)
2016: Ħuta (Fish)
2016: The Play of Waves (in English)
2019: Sagħtejn u Nofs 'il Bogħod mill-Ġenna (Two and a Half Hours Away from Heaven)
2023: Għażiż Ġismi (My Dear Body)

== Theatre ==
- 2013: translated Molière's Don Juan for the first edition of the Valletta International Baroque Festival.
- 2014: translated and adapted for stage Nicholas Monsarrat's The Kappillan of Malta. Produced by Stagun Teatrali Malti for the Malta International Arts Festival (2014).
- 2015: wrote Faith, Hope u Charity for Stagun Teatrali Malti, presented at the Malta International Arts Festival (2015).
- 2016: translated Anders Lustgarten's Lampedusa for Unifaun Theatre.
- 2016: wrote this year's edition of Il-Qarcilla.
- 2023: wrote Dik is-Siġra f'Nofs ta' Triq (A Tree in the Middle of a Road), a play in verse, for Theatre Anon. and co-produced with Teatru Malta

== Children's literature ==
2004: Stejjer li Kibru fl-Art (Stories Growing on the Ground)
2009: Orqod, qalbi, Orqod (Sleep, my child, Sleep)
2021: Paramm Paramm

== Literary awards ==
- 2021: National Literary Award, co-winner, Jien-Noti-Jien (with Toni Sant)
- 2016: National Literary Award, winner, Ħuta
- 2015: National Literary Award, winner, Jutta Heim
- 2014: National Literary Award, winner, Penelopi Tistenna
- 2011: European Union Prize for Literature, winner Malta, Fl-Isem tal-Missier (tal-iben)
- 2008: Premio Strega Europa, shortlist, L-Istejjer Strambi ta' Sara Sue Sammut
- 2005: National Literary Award, second place, Kimika
- 2002: National Literary Award, winner, L-Istejjer Strambi ta' Sara Sue Sammut
- 2001: National Literary Award, second place, Il-Ktieb tar-Riħ u l-Fjuri
