= Rużar Briffa =

Maltese poet and dermatologist (1906–1963)

Rużar Briffa (1906–1963) was a Maltese poet and dermatologist, and a major figure in Maltese literature.

"I never thought of publishing these poems in a book. Some were written in hard times, others in moments of joy. And I wrote them for myself." These were the poet's words as they appeared in his first collection of poetry, Poeżiji, published in 1971 thanks to his second wife Louisette and his friend P. Valentin Barbara's constant encouragement.

== Life ==
He was known as the poet "of smallness and simplicity - the superior". Rużar Briffa studied at the Saint Elmo elementary state school and at the Valletta Lyceum. Having obtained his matriculation certificate, in 1923 he started teaching at elementary schools. In 1924, he began his studies in medicine at the University of Malta and completed them in London in venereology and dermatology. In 1932 he became a specialist in skin diseases. He was known for his humility and his greatheartedness in dealing with his patients, especially those suffering from leprosy.

According to his wife Louisette, he dreamed of beautifying disfigured and suffering patients through his medical work. This aesthetic concern emerges frequently in his literary work, so much so that he was known as the "Poet of Beauty" amongst his contemporaries.

In 1931, together with his friend Ġużè Bonnici, he founded the Għaqda tal-Malti Università, which is active to date, and started issuing the magazine Leħen il-Malti ("Voice of the Maltese").

Rużar Briffa died on 22 February 1963. His full biography was released in 1984 by Professor Oliver Friggieri.

The Maltese town of Mosta contains a road named in his honour, Triq Rużar Briffa.

== Poetry ==
Many of his poems were written on bits of papers cut from notebooks or on the inner part of a used packet of cigarettes. Others were written on papers intended for medical prescriptions, on paper-bags; in short, he would use anything that was at hand to capture his poem on paper.

Although Briffa wrote very little, he was greatly appreciated by literary critics. These are some comments Briffa passed on poetry, as an individual interpretation and universal expression:

My poems are no great events, no profound thoughts on Life, and not even exalted desires of another World. They are just impressions, to put it this way, snapshots of everyday life as my heart senses them. The power of a snapshot is in its size, which in spite of being small, captures details which in a larger photo would pass unnoticed ... I too feel my poems have the power of simplicity.

I did not write for glory. Poetry for me is by no means a matter of amusement, but rather of great suffering.

I am struck by a thought and I keep brooding over it for several months –- or even years. Then I feel a sudden outburst. And no matter where I am, I would have to get a pencil and a paper and in a matter of a minute the poem flows out of nothing. No poem took me more than five minutes to write down.

Poetry should only aim to reach the heart of the heart of man, and even if it arrives at it just once, then poetry would have reached its climax.
