= Antoine Cassar =

Maltese poet and translator

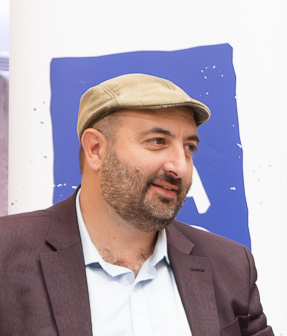
- .Antoine Cassar (2023)
- Born: 1978 (age 47–48); Camden, London, United Kingdom
- Citizenship: Malta, United Kingdom
- Occupations: Poet, translator
- Writing career
- Period: 2007-present
- Genre: Poetry
- Notable works: Mużajk, Passaport, Forty Days

Antoine Christopher A. F. Cassar (born 1978 in London) is a Maltese poet and translator. His book-length poem Erbgħin Jum (Forty Days, Ede, 2017) was awarded the National Book Prize in 2018, and shortlisted for the European Poet of Freedom award, based in Gdańsk, Poland. Passaport, a protest poem about borders nested inside a love poem to humanity as a naturally migrating species, has been published in over a dozen languages, and adapted for the theatre in Europe, the Americas and Australia. In September 2009, his multilingual poem Merħba was the Grand Prize winner of the United Planet Writing Contest.

== Personal life ==
Cassar was born in London to Maltese parents. He lived in Spain, Italy, and Luxembourg.

== Works ==
Cassar's work deals with themes of language, maps and borders.

Passport (2009) is a poem published in a mock-passport form addressing themes of migration and nationhood. It was translated into nine languages, with proceeds donated to refugee charities around the world.

=== Mosaics poems ===
Cassar's mużajki or mosaics poems combine a minimum of five languages, mainly English, French, Italian, Maltese and Spanish, often in the form of a Petrarchan sonnet. These poems, the first series of which was published in July 2007 in the anthology Ħbula Stirati (Tightropes), engage in the braiding of words and sounds in the different languages used whilst maintaining a coherent rhythm and logical poetic sequence. Among the main themes explored by the mosaics are the vanity and futility of life, love unrequited or fulfilled, the absurdity of colonialism and its after-effects, and the at once exhilarating and disorienting feeling of variety itself. The following is a stanza from his sonnet C'est la vie

Original

Run, rabbit, run, run, run, from the womb to the tomb,
de cuatro a dos a tres, del río a la mar,
play the fool, suffer school, żunżana ddur iddur,
engage-toi, perds ta foi, le regole imparar, [...]

English translation

Run, rabbit, run, run, run, from the womb to the tomb,
from four to two to three, from the river to the sea,
play the fool, suffer school, the wasp goes round and round,
get involved, lose your faith, learn the rules, [...]

As Marija Grech explains, "…the deeper significance of these poems may be said to lie not simply in the more traditional meaning of the individual words or verses, but more specifically in the play with sound that the movement from one language to another generates and exploits. As the poet explains, 'the mosaics are designed not so much to be read but to be heard'." Cassar, on an interview, describes the meaning of the "multiple levels" on his poetry: "How often does one read or listen to a poem and understand it completely? In my reading experience, I find that if a poem offers all its connotation, undertones and beauty at one go, its taste will soon be forgotten… The multiple levels of a poem should pique and stir the readers' curiosity, slowly but surely bringing them deeper into the text."

== See also ==
- Modern Macaronic literature
- (in Italian) Poesia multilingue
