= Dun Karm Psaila =

Maltese Roman Catholic priest and poet (1871–1961)

The Reverend Monsignor Karm Psaila
- National Poet of Malta
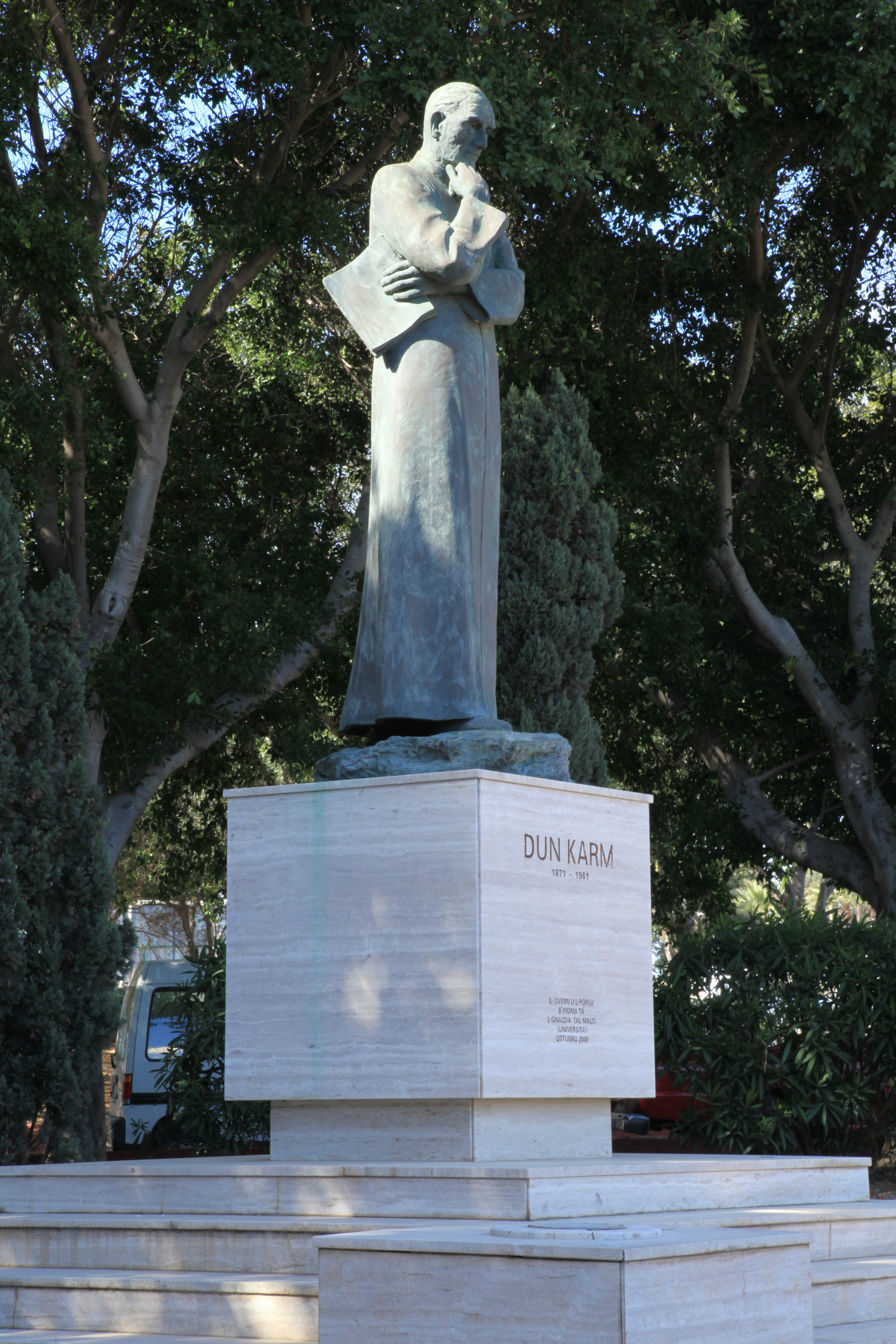
- Monument to Dun Karm Psaila in Floriana
- Archdiocese: Malta

Orders
- Ordination: 1894
- Rank: Monsignor

Personal details
- Born: Carmelo Psaila; 18 October 1871 Ħaż-Żebbuġ, Crown Colony of Malta
- Died: 13 October 1961 (aged 89) Valletta, Crown Colony of Malta
- Buried: Cemetery of the Sacred Heart in Ħaż-Żebbuġ
- Denomination: Roman Catholic
- Residence: Ħaż-Żebbuġ
- Parents: Filippo Psaila and Annunziata Psaila
- Profession: Priest, teacher, writer, poet

Sainthood
- Feast day: 13–18 October (Dun Karm Psaila day)

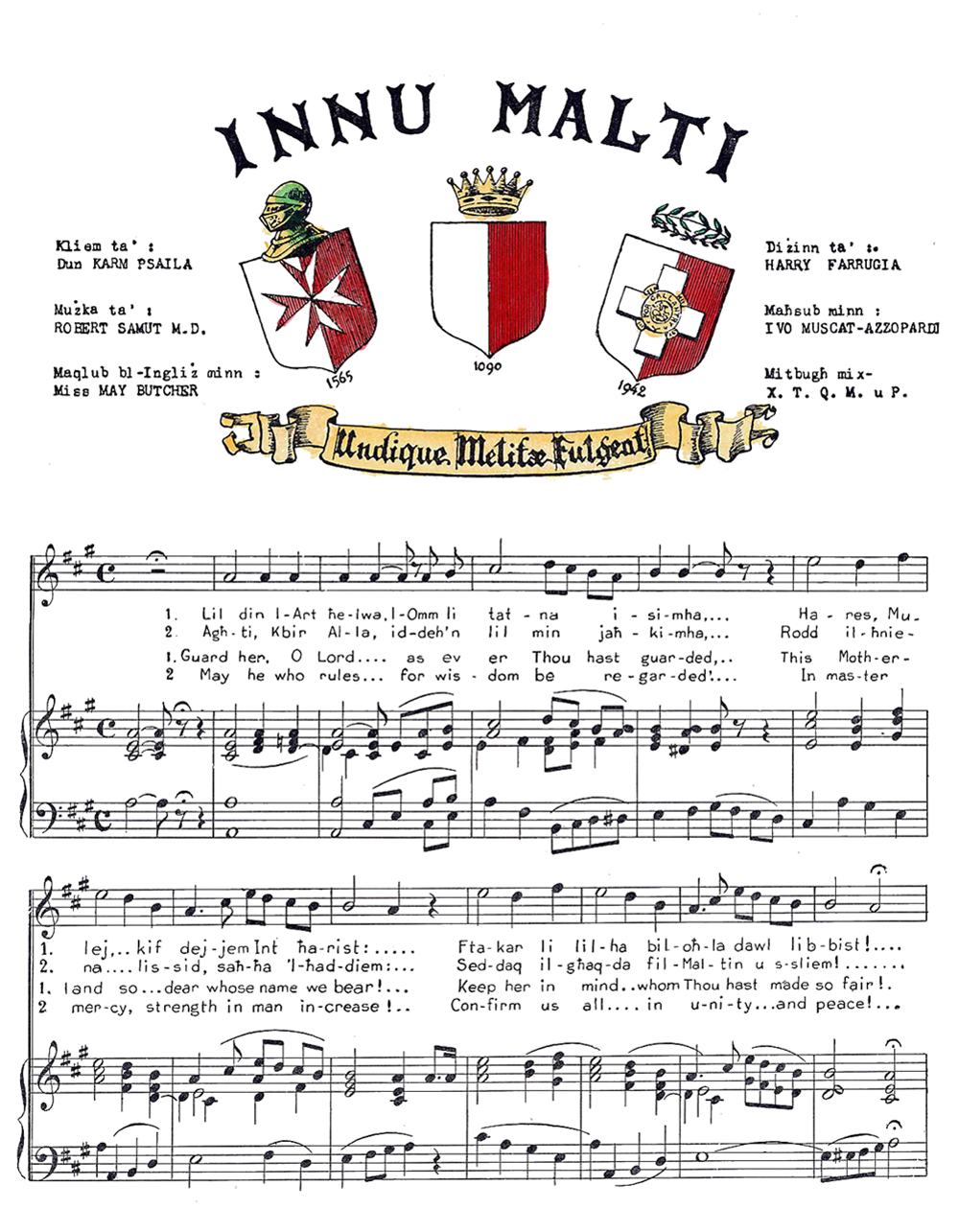
Dun Karm Psaila wrote "L-Innu Malti"

Carmelo Psaila, better known as Dun Karm Psaila (18 October 1871 – 13 October 1961) was a Maltese Roman Catholic priest, writer and poet, sometimes called the "bard of Malta". He is widely recognised as the Maltese national poet and as the lyricist for the Maltese national anthem (Maltese: L-Innu Malti).

== Early life and education ==
Carmelo Psaila was born in Żebbuġ on 18 October 1871. His parents were Filippo Psaila and Annunziata Psaila née Pisani, his mother being a relative of painter Lazzaro Pisani.

He was educated at the seminary between the years 1885 and 1894 and then proceeded to study philosophy in 1888 and theology in 1890 the University of Malta.

== Career ==
He was ordained as a priest in 1894. From 1895 to 1921 he taught at the seminary. The subjects included: Italian, Latin, English, arithmetic, geography, cosmography, ecclesiastical history and Christian archaeology. He was appointed assistant librarian at the National Library of Malta in 1921, followed by director of circulating libraries in 1923. The latter being a role he held until retiring in 1936.

Dun Karm was one of the founding members of the Għaqda tal-Kittieba tal-Malti (founded in 1921) and on the death of Ġużè Muscat Azzopardi in 1927, he was elected president of the Għaqda. He was later appointed editor of the official periodical, Il-Malti. He carried out these functions until 1942 when he was nominated honorary president of the Għaqda for life.

In 1945, for recognition of his contribution to Maltese literature, he was the first person to be honorarily granted a Doctor of Letters by the Royal University of Malta. In 1946 he was awarded the Ġużè Muscat Azzopardi gold medal. He was decorated with Commander of the Order of the British Empire by Queen Elizabeth II in 1956. In 1957 the Maltese government issued him an ex-gratia pension.

== Works ==
Dun Karm is best known as the author the verses of a good number of popular religious hymns in Maltese, including the Maltese national anthem.

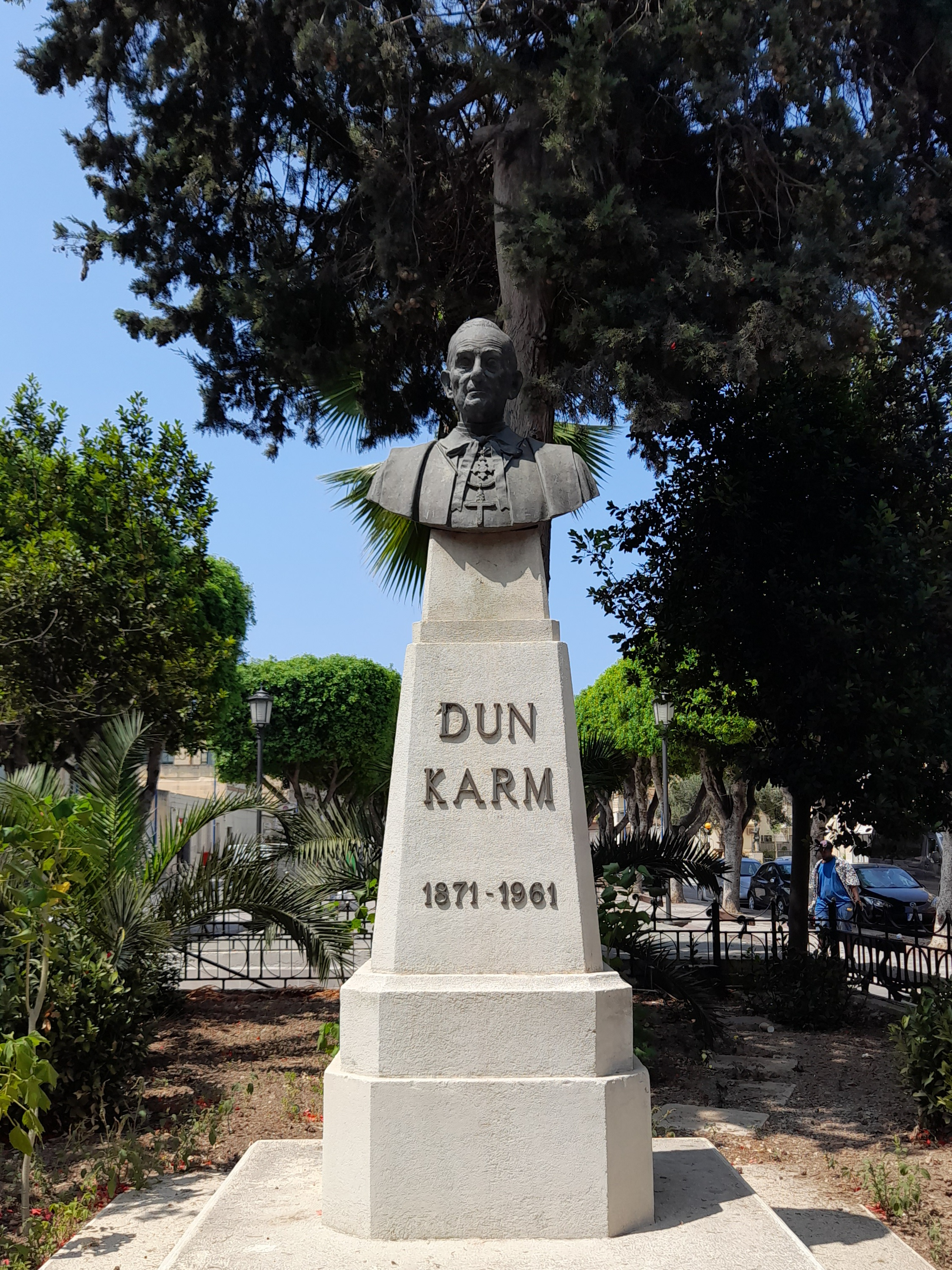
A statue of Psaila located in his home town of Żebbuġ

Before 1912 Dun Karm only wrote in Italian. His first known published poem is La Dignità Episcopale (1889) after which he published Foglie d'Alloro (1896) and Versi (1903) another collection of Italian poems. In 1912, Dun Karm wrote Kuddiem Xbieha tal Madonna, his first poem in Maltese, which appeared in the first issue of the Maltese periodical Kuddiem Xbieha tal MadonnaIl-Ħabib, published by Pawl Galea and Ġużè Muscat Azzopardi. His best-known poems include Il-Musbieħ tal-Mużew (1920).

In 1921 the director of education, A.V. Laferla, asked Dun Karm to compose some verses to a piece of music written by Dr Robert Samut. The result, L-Innu Malti, was sung publicly for the first time at the Manoel Theatre in 1923. It was officially designated the national anthem in 1941, and later in 1964 was re-affirmed in the Constitution of Malta after independence.

Dun Karm's writings include Żewġ Anġli: Inez u Emilia (translated in 1934 from an Italian novel by D. Caprile) Besides these he wrote a few critical works. He also compiled a dictionary between 1947 and 1955 in three volumes, Dizzjunarju Ingliż u Malti.

=== Translations ===
A.J. Arberry translated about 37 of Dun Karm's poems into English, published in 1961. Ġużè Delia translated Il-Vjatku into Spanish and Laurent Ropa translated Il-Jien u lil hinn Minnu into French. Carmel Mallia translated the latter into Esperanto. Yevgeniy Vitkovskiy translated Ħerba, Kewkbet is-Safar, and Wied Qirda into Russian.

== See also ==
- Hymns by Dun Karm Psaila
- L-Innu Malti
