= Joseph Aquilina =

Maltese author and linguist (1911–1997)

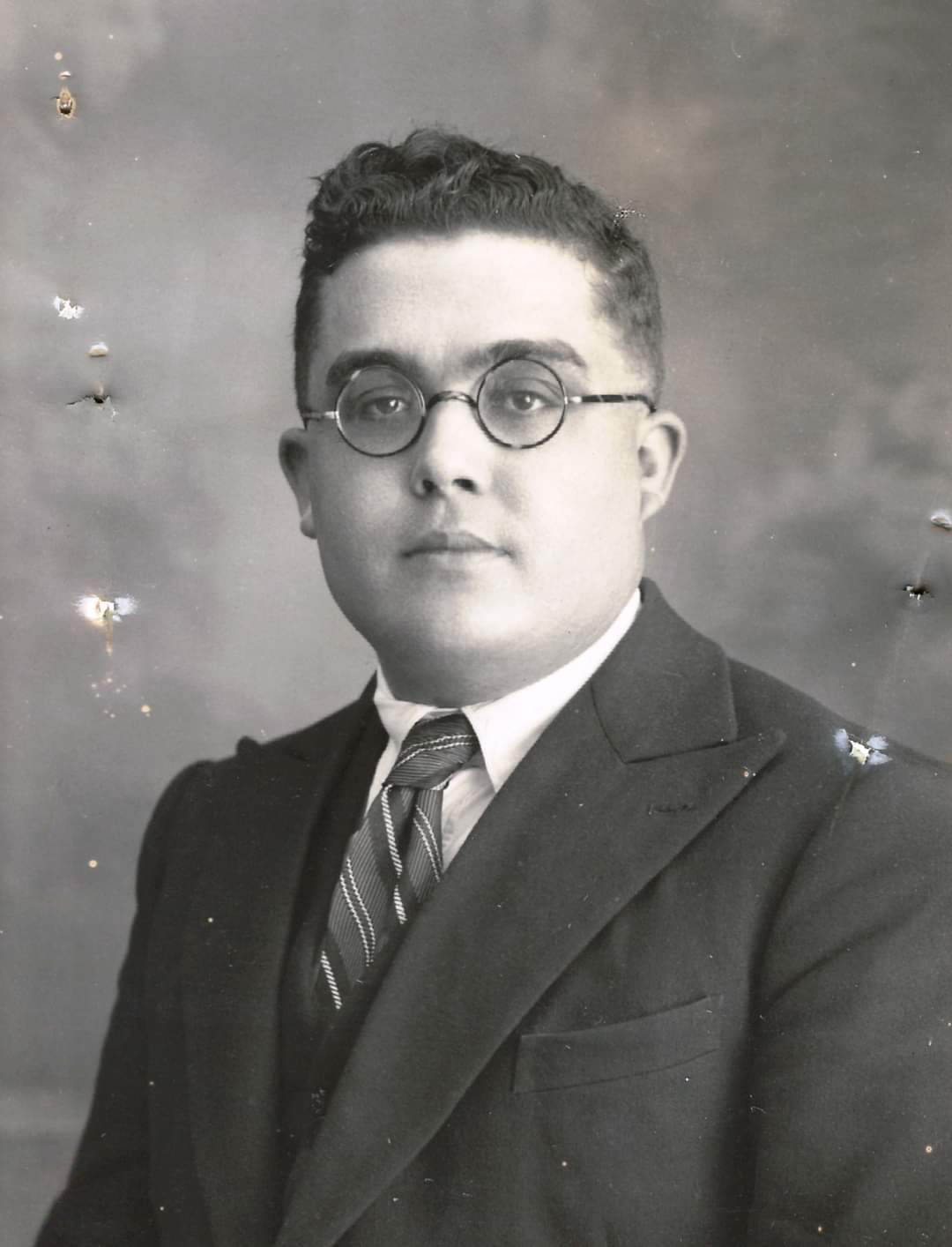
- Born: Ġużè Aquilina; 7 April 1911; Munxar, Crown Colony of Malta
- Died: 8 August 1997 (aged 86)
- Education: University of Malta; University of London
- Occupations: Linguist and writer
- Spouse: Beatrice
- Children: 3
- Writing career
- Language: English; Maltese

Ġużè Aquilina (7 April 1911 – 8 August 1997), often called Joseph Aquilina in English, was a Maltese author and linguist born in Munxar.

== Early life and education ==
Aquilina was born in Munxar, Gozo, on 7 April 1911. He studied first at Ta’ Sannat Primary School and then at the Gozo Seminary, before being accepted to the University of Malta.

He graduated, first as Bachelor of Arts and later as a lawyer from the University of Malta. Between 1937 and 1940 he read comparative Semitic philology at the University of London, where he obtained a doctorate, with his thesis The structure of Maltese.

== Career ==
In 1940 Ġużè Aquilina was appointed as the first professor of Maltese and oriental languages at the University of Malta, where he contributed in a significant manner towards the study and strengthening of the Maltese language. It was only in 1934, three years before his appointment, that the Maltese language had been declared the official language of Malta. He was the editor of several university magazines, including Leħen il-Malti.

Among the prominent posts which Aquilina held as a full-time professor at the University of Malta, was that as Dean of the Faculty of Arts.

Aquilina's numerous works include novels, philosophical essays, critical studies, drama, linguistic papers and religious books, his magnum opus being a Maltese–English Dictionary.

== Personal life ==
He married his wife Beatrice in 1944. They had three children; John, Miriam and Helen.

== Partial bibliography ==
- Teach Yourself Maltese. Teach Yourself Books, Hodder & Stoughton, London 1965; 6th impression 1985
- A Comparative Dictionary of Maltese Proverbs, 1972
- Papers in Maltese Linguistics. University of Malta
- A Survey of Contemporary Dialectal Maltese (jointly with B.S. Isserlin), Gozo/Leeds 1981 ISBN 978-0-907860-00-6.
- Twemmin u Ħajja ["Faith and Life"], 1984
- Maltese–English Dictionary, I-II, Midsea Books Ltd, Malta, 1987–1990, 1,673 pages

== See also ==
- List of essayists
- List of linguists
- List of Maltese people
- List of University of London people
