= Lucy Caldwell =

Northern Irish playwright and novelist (born 1981)

Lucy Caldwell FRSL
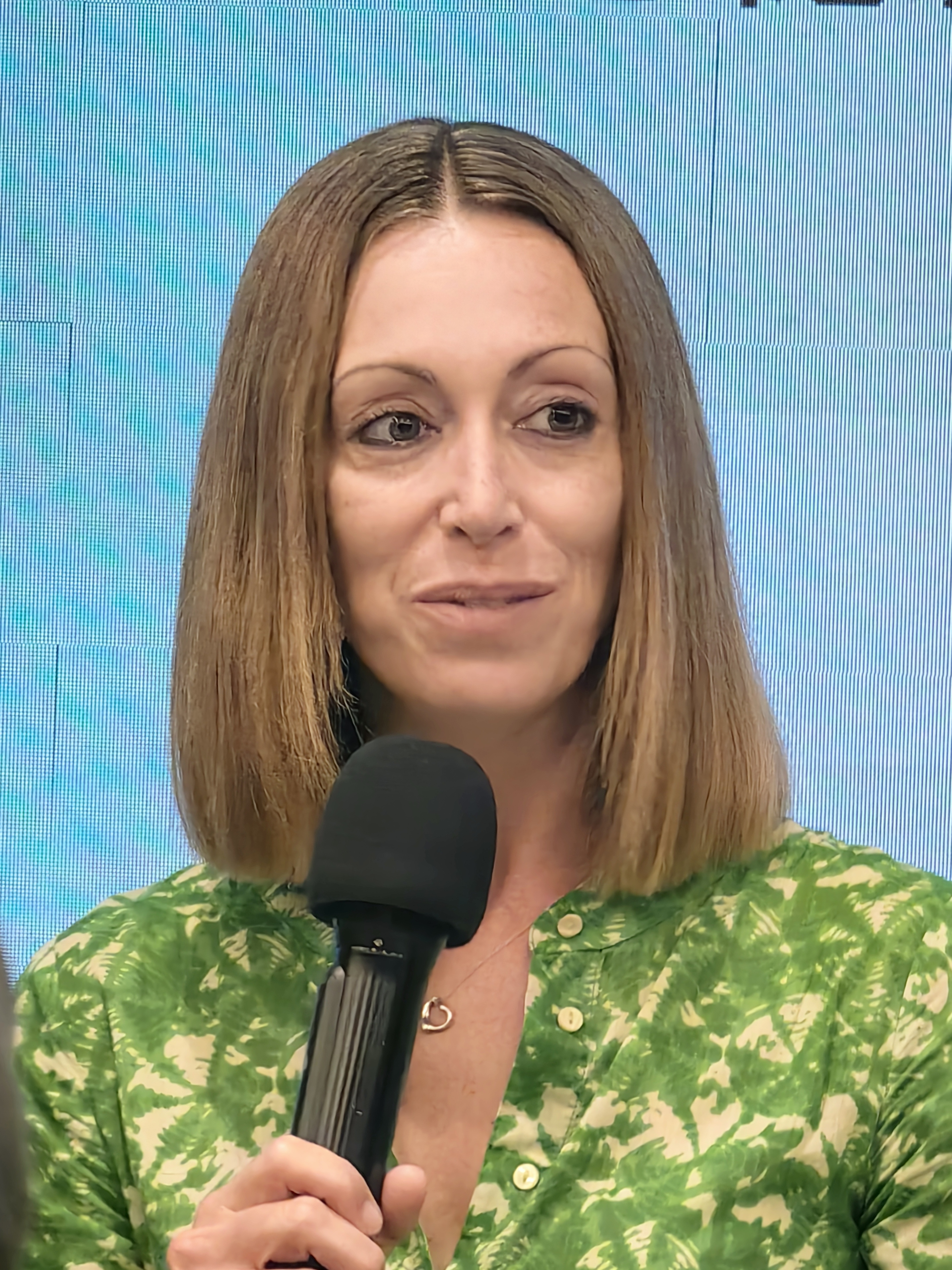
- Lucy Caldwell at 2025 Shanghai Book Fair
- Born: 1981 (age 44–45); Belfast, Northern Ireland
- Education: Strathearn School; Queens' College, Cambridge; Goldsmiths College
- Occupations: Playwright and novelist
- Writing career
- Genres: playwright; novelist
- Notable works: Leaves; The River
- Notable awards: George Devine Award; Susan Smith Blackburn Award; Richard Imison Award; BBC National Short Story Award
- Website: www.lucycaldwell.com

Lucy Caldwell FRSL (born 1981) is a Northern Irish playwright and novelist. She was the winner of the 2021 BBC National Short Story Award and of the 2023 Walter Scott Prize.

== Early life and education ==
Lucy Caldwell was born in Belfast in 1981.

She studied at Strathearn School and later at Queens' College, Cambridge, graduating with a first-class degree, and Goldsmiths, University of London.

== Career ==
In June 2004, Caldwell's first short play, The River, was performed at the Royal Welsh College of Music & Drama, and subsequently the Edinburgh Festival Fringe. The play won her the PMA Most Promising Playwright Award. Caldwell spent time as writer-on-attachment to the National Theatre in 2005. Her first full-length play, Leaves, won the 2006 George Devine Award, the 2007 Susan Smith Blackburn Prize and the Stewart Parker Award. In 2007 it was produced by the Druid Theatre Company, and directed by Garry Hynes. The play premiered in Galway before transferring to the Royal Court Theatre.

Her second full-length play, Guardians, premiered at the 2009 HighTide Festival in Halesworth. Reviewing the production, critic Michael Billington wrote: "[Caldwell] writes with real power about lost love. I was much moved." Notes to Future Self was produced at the Birmingham Repertory Theatre in March 2011, directed by Rachel Kavanaugh. It was described in The Stage as "Brave, beautiful, and quite extraordinary".

=== Radio plays ===
Caldwell's radio play, Girl from Mars, broadcast by BBC Radio 4 in 2008, won the Irish Playwrights' and Screenwriters' Guild Award ("ZeBBie") for Best Radio Play and the BBC's Richard Imison Award for best script by a writer new to radio. In their verdict, the judges said:

"This is a gripping and powerful depiction of the effect on a family when one sibling goes missing. The beautifully-told story begins when a body is found and the remaining daughter returns to be with her family while they await identification. Girl From Mars is moving and emotionally taut. It veers away from sentimentality and felt personal and believable. The structure is complex – combining three different timescales – and uses radio to its full potential, using many techniques including voice-overs, dialogue, text messages, and voice mail. The story has a shades-of-grey resolution about the way a person's life can tragically stop short – and this is echoed in the subtle way the writer ends her own play too."

=== Novels and other fiction ===
Caldwell's first novel, Where They Were Missed, set in Belfast and County Donegal, was published in February 2006 by Faber & Faber and short-listed for the 2006 Dylan Thomas Prize. It was described by Vogue as "a debut reminiscent of Ian McEwan's The Cement Garden and Trezza Azzopardi's The Hiding Place.

Caldwell's second novel, The Meeting Point, centred on a young Irish missionary couple who journey to Bahrain, was published in February 2011. It was described by the Sunday Times as "Compelling, passionate and deeply resonant", and by The Guardian as "haunting... compulsively readable".

Caldwell won the 2021 BBC National Short Story Award for "All the People Were Mean and Bad".

In 2022, Caldwell published These Days, a fictionalised account of the Belfast Blitz, revolving around the lives of two sisters.

== Awards and honours ==
- 2006: George Devine Award for Leaves
- 2007: Susan Smith Blackburn Award for Leaves
- 2009: Irish Playwrights' and Screenwriters' Guild Award for Girl from Mars
- 2009: Richard Imison Award for Girl From Mars
- 2011: Rooney Prize for Irish Literature.
- 2011: Dylan Thomas Prize for The Meeting Point
- 2012: Major Individual Artist Award from the Arts Council of Northern Ireland
- 2013: Shortlisted, Kerry Group Irish Fiction Award for All the Beggars Riding
- 2013: Fiction Uncovered selection, All the Beggars Riding
- 2013: All the Beggars Riding chosen as Belfast's One City One Book
- 2014: Commonwealth Writers’ Award (Canada and Europe)
- 2018: Elected Fellow of the Royal Society of Literature in its "40 Under 40" initiative.
- 2021: BBC National Short Story Award for "All the People Were Mean and Bad".
- 2022: E. M. Forster Award from the American Academy of Arts and Letters.
- 2023: Walter Scott Prize for historical fiction, for These Days

== Selected works ==
=== Novels ===
- Where They Were Missed (Faber, 2005) ISBN 9780670916054, OCLC 62475550
- The Meeting Point (Faber, 2011) ISBN 9780571272815, OCLC 663441515
- All the Beggars Riding (Faber, 2013) ISBN 9780571270552, OCLC 815364539
- These Days (Faber, 2022)

=== Short Story Collections ===
- Multitudes: Eleven Stories (Faber, 2016) ISBN 9780571313501, OCLC 949756278
- Intimacies (Faber, 2021)
- Openings: Thirteen Stories (Faber, 2024)
- Devotions: Eight Stories (Faber, 2026)

=== Stage plays ===
- Leaves (2007) ISBN 9780822223283, OCLC 436843820; Chapel Lane, Galway, transferring to the Royal Court (Upstairs), London
- Carnival (2008) produced by Kabosh at Edinburgh Festival Spiegeltent
- Guardians (2009)
- The Luthier (2009) Origin Theatre Company as part of the New York 1st Irish Festival
- Notes to Future Self (2011) at Birmingham Repertory Theatre Company
- Hier Soir, Demain Soir (2012), commissioned by the Comédie de Valence, for Festival Ambivalence(s)

=== Radio plays ===
- Girl from Mars (2008) BBC Radio 4
- Avenues of Eternal Peace (2009) BBC Radio 4
- The Watcher on the Wall (2013) BBC Radio 4
- At Sea (2024) BBC Radio 4
