= Where They Were Missed =

2006 debut novel from Northern Irish author Lucy Caldwell

- First edition
- Author: Lucy Caldwell
- Language: English
- Publisher: Viking Press
- Publication date: Feb 2006
- Publication place: United Kingdom
- Media type: Print (paperback)
- Pages: 240
- ISBN: 0-670-91605-6

Where They Were Missed is the debut novel from Northern Irish author Lucy Caldwell (though she had previously written plays). It was shortlisted for the inaugural Dylan Thomas Prize and the Waverton Good Read Award. It was named by The Guardian's Glenn Patterson as one of the 'top 10 Belfast books'.

== Plot introduction ==
The first part of the novel is set in 1980s Protestant East Belfast and is told through the eyes of six-year-old Saoirse whose father is in the RUC and mother, a Catholic from Donegal struggles to cope with the sectarian pressures and turns to drink. Tragedy then strikes and they are forced to leave Belfast...

The second part of the novel takes place ten years later in Gweebarra Bay, County Donegal where the teenage Saoirse discovers the secret behind her family's dislocation.

== Reception ==
- It was described by Vogue as "a debut reminiscent of Ian McEwan's The Cement Garden and Trezza Azzopardi's The Hiding Place."
- David Pierce wrote in Irish Studies Around the World that "I can think of very few novels written by an author in her early twenties which are as accomplished as this one. Caldwell has a keen eye for hauntings, for what’s been lost, for false strings, only now the loss is wrapped in the continuing trauma of sectarianism and the Troubles."
- The Tablet said "It is difficult to do justice to the remarkable nature of this novel, so searing in its presentation of naked sorrow and so moving in the heroine’s courage."
