= Pierre Zalloua =

Lebanese geneticist

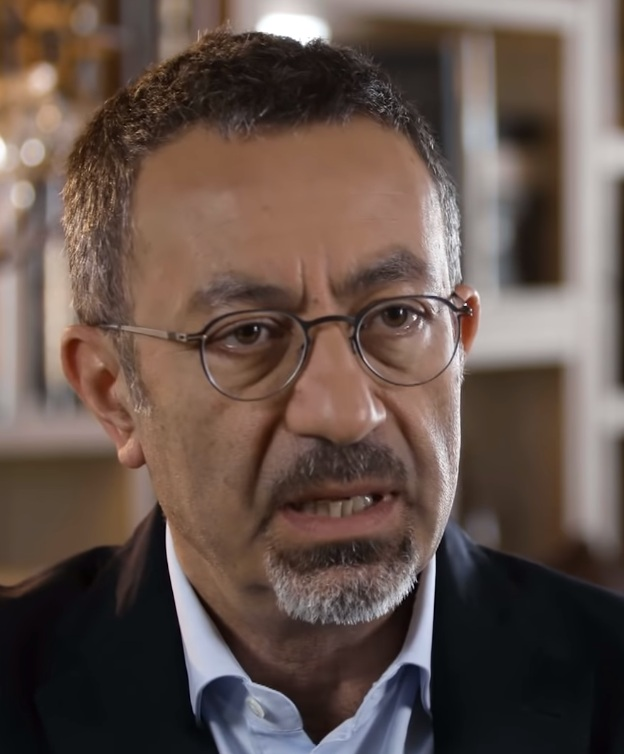
- Pierre Zalloua as hosted narrator of "Lebanon and Maronites :A History and Faith", A Feb 2020 documentary by MTV Lebanon
- Born: February 9, 1965 (age 61); Zgharta, Lebanon
- Education: UC Davis, California
- Scientific career
- Fields: Genetics
- Workplaces: American University of Beirut, Lebanese American University, Harvard School of Public Health

Pierre Zalloua (Arabic: بيار زلّوعة; born February 9, 1965) is a Lebanese Geneticist. His contributions to biology include numerous researches in genetic predisposition to diseases such as type 1 diabetes and β-thalassemia. He is most noted for taking part in the National Geographic Society's Genographic Project.

== Youth and education ==
Pierre Zalloua was born in Zgharta on February 9, 1965. He obtained his Biology degree from the American University of Beirut in 1987 and a Genetics master's degree from the San Jose State University in California in 1990. Zalloua worked on his Doctorate degree in genetics from the UC Davis between 1990 and 1996 and graduated in 1996.

== Career ==
Dr. Pierre Zalloua was appointed Dean of Graduate Studies and Research as of October 1, 2013. His past engagements with LAU include Dean of the School of Pharmacy from October 2012 to September 2013 and Professor of Genetics at the School of Medicine. He joined LAU in 2007. He also holds the position of adjunct professor of Environmental Health at the Harvard School of Public Health. Currently he is the Chair of the Department of Public Health and Epidemiology at the College of Medicine and Health Sciences at Khalifa University. An accomplished geneticist, writer and lecturer, Dr. Zalloua is a leading authority on the genetics of complex diseases in and among Middle Eastern populations. Much of his early investigative studies have addressed molecular anomalies observed in people with Type 1 diabetes and coronary artery disease (CAD). His research interest is to identify complex disease (Type 1 Diabetes, cardiovascular disease and cancer) susceptibility genes, to study their interaction with the environment, and to correlate these interactions with disease onset and manifestation. In the last few years, he has made considerable progress in identifying diabetes and CAD disease susceptibility gene variants. Dr. Zalloua has also conducted extensive research on the genetic links between various Middle Eastern and Mediterranean populations. Recently, he has started to work in the field of population patterns of human migrations using DNA. He has led an investigative team that will obtain DNA samples from indigenous populations in the Middle East and North Africa to study their genetic commonalities. This study is part of what is known as the Genographic Project (a grant from the National Geographic Society, 2006–2010). He was also the principal investigator for the FGENTCARD Project, a European Union research project (2007–2009). He was recently awarded a large grant from the Qatar National Research Foundation to study the genetic susceptibility to Type 2 diabetes. His current research leverages rich multi-modal data from large-scale cohorts, including the UK Biobank and similar cohorts employing advanced machine learning (ML) algorithms to analyze targeted SNPs and proteins within selected T2D-related pathways, while controlling for other health determinants, the aim of this research is to uncover unique multi-modal signatures of T2D risk and phenotypic heterogeneity. Dr. Zalloua graduated from the American University of Beirut in 1987 with a B.S. in biology. He earned his M.A. in Biological Sciences from San Jose State University in 1990, and his Ph.D. in genetics from the University of California, Davis in 1996. He completed research fellowships in genetics at the University of California, Davis (1996–1997), in molecular biology at Applied Biosystems (1997–1998), and in population genetics (1998–2001) at the Harvard School of Public Health. He was an assistant professor, and then associate professor in the school of medicine at the American University of Beirut between 2003 and 2007.

== Awards and grants ==
Dr. Zalloua received many grants from national and international organizations including: National Geographic Society, European Commission, Lown Scholar Grant- Harvard University, Qatar National Research Foundation, Eli Lilly, Lebanese National Center Scientific Research. In 2018 her was awarded a NIH grant (R21) to investigate the impact of forced displacement on Type Two Diabetes.

== Film ==
2004 – Quest for the Phoenicians (PBS)

== Books ==
2005 – Ancestors- Identity and DNA in the Levant (Random House) https://www.penguinrandomhouse.com/books/742895/ancestors-by-pierre-zalloua/

== Media appearances ==
2009 – CNN: Inside the Middle East. watch at https://www.youtube.com/watch?v=BP7TcPj7UAE

2007 – Kalam el Nass – LBC. watch at https://www.youtube.com/watch?v=IoPGLFY1Lxs

2004 – National Geographic Television. 1 Hour film featuring work on the genetic patterns of human migrations in the Middle East, aired on National Geographic Television worldwide and the PBS TV station in the US and Canada.

2004 – National Geographic Magazine. 22 page feature article in the October issue, 2004 that features study on the genetic patterns of human migrations in the Middle East.

2004 – National Geographic Magazine (French Version). 22 page feature article in the November issue, 2004 that features study on the genetic patterns of human migrations in the Middle East.

== Selected peer-reviewed journal articles ==
- Marc Haber, Dominique Gauguier, Sonia Youhanna, Nick Patterson, Priya Moorjani, Laura R. Botigué, Daniel E. Platt, Elizabeth Matisoo-Smith, David F Soria-Hernanz, R. Spencer Wells, Jaume Bertranpetit, Chris Tyler-Smith, David Comas, Pierre A Zalloua. Genome-wide diversity in the Levant reveals recent structuring by culture. PLoS Genetics, 2013 Feb;9(2)
- Danielle A Badro, Bouchra Douaihy, Marc Haber, Sonia C Youhanna, Angélique Salloum, Michella Ghassibe-Sabbagh, Brian Johnsrud, Georges Khazen, Elizabeth Matisoo-Smith, David F Soria-Hernanz, R Spencer Wells, Chris Tyler-Smith, Daniel E Platt, Pierre A Zalloua, The Genographic Consortium. Y-Chromosome and mtDNA genetics reveal significant contrasts in affinities of modern Middle Eastern populations with European and African populations. PLoS ONE, 2013;8(1).
- Large-scale association analysis identifies new risk loci for coronary artery disease. Nature Genetics. December 2012, Nature Genetics doi:10.1038/ng.2480 http://www.nature.com/ng/journal/vaop/ncurrent/full/ng.2480.html
- Michella Ghassibe-Sabbagh, Daniel E. Platt, Sonia Youhanna, Antoine B. Abchee, Krista Stewart, Danielle A. Badro, Marc Haber, Angelique K. Salloum, Bouchra Douaihy, Hamid el Bayeh, Raed Othman, Nabil Shasha, Samer Kibbani, Elie Chammas, Aline Milane, Rita Nemr, Yoichiro Kamatani, Jörg Hager, Jean-Baptiste Cazier, Dominique Gauguier, Pierre A. Zalloua, FGENTCARD Consortium. Genetic and environmental influences on total plasma homocysteine and its role in coronary artery disease risk. Atherosclerosis. 2012 May;222(1).
- Jörg Hager, Yoichiro Kamatani, Jean-Baptiste Cazier, Sonia Youhanna, Michella Ghassibe-Sabbagh, Daniel E. Platt, Antoine B. Abchee, Jihane Romanos, Georges Khazen, Raed Othman, Danielle A. Badro, Marc Haber, Angelique K. Salloum, Bouchra Douaihy,4 Nabil Shasha, Samer Kibbani, Hana Sbeite, Elie Chammas, Hamid el Bayeh, Francis Rousseau, Diana Zelenika, Ivo Gut, Mark Lathrop, Martin Farrall, Dominique Gauguier, Pierre A. Zalloua, and the FGENTCARD Consortium. Genome-wide Association Study in a Lebanese Cohort Confirms PHACTR1 as a Major Determinant of Coronary Artery Stenosis. PLoS One. 2012;7(6).
- Marc Haber, Daniel E Platt, Maziar Ashrafian Bonab, Sonia C Youhanna, David F Soria-Hernanz, Begoña Martínez-Cruz, Bouchra Douaihy, Michella Ghassibe-Sabbagh, Hoshang Rafatpanah, Mohsen Ghanbari, John Whale, Oleg Balanovsky, R Spencer Wells, David Comas, Chris Tyler-Smith, Pierre A. Zalloua & The Genographic Consortium. Afghanistan's ethnic groups share a Y-Chromosomal heritage structured by historical events. PLoS One. 2012;7(3).
- Stephanie Saade, Jean-Baptiste Cazier, Michella Ghassibe-Sabbagh, Sonia Youhanna, Danielle A. Badro, Yoichiro Kamatani, Jörg Hager, Joumana S. Yeretzian, Georges El-Khazen, Marc Haber, Angelique K. Salloum, Bouchra Douaihy, Raed Othman, Nabil Shasha, Samer Kabbani, Hamid El Bayeh, Elie Chammas, Martin Farrall, Dominique Gauguier, Daniel E. Platt, Pierre A. Zalloua, and the FGENTCARD consortium. Large Scale Association Analysis Identifies Three Susceptibility Loci for Coronary Artery Disease. PLoS One. 2011;6(12)
- Pierre A. Zalloua, Daniel E. Platt, Mirvat El Sibai, Jade Khalife, Nadine Makhoul, Marc Haber, Yali Xue, Hassan Izaabel, Elena Bosch, Susan M. Adams, Eduardo Arroyo, Ana Marı ´a Lo´ pez-Parra, Mercedes Aler, Anto` nia Picornell, Misericordia Ramon, Mark A. Jobling, David Comas, Jaume Bertranpetit, R. Spencer Wells, Chris Tyler-Smith,* and The Genographic Consortium. Identifying Genetic Traces of Historical Expansions: Phoenician Footprints in the Mediterranean.The American Journal of Human Genetics, 83(5):633–42; 2008.
- Pierre A Zalloua; Yali Xue; Jade Khalife; Nadine Makhoul; Labib Debiane; Daniel E Platt; Ajay K Royyuru; Rene J Herrera; David F Soria Hernanz; Jason Blue-Smith; R. Spencer Wells; David Comas; Jaume Bertranpetit; Chris Tyler-Smith; The Genographic Project. Y-chromosomal diversity in Lebanon is structured by recent historical events. Am J of Human genetics, 82(4):873–82; 2008.
