= Anton Sammut =

Maltese author

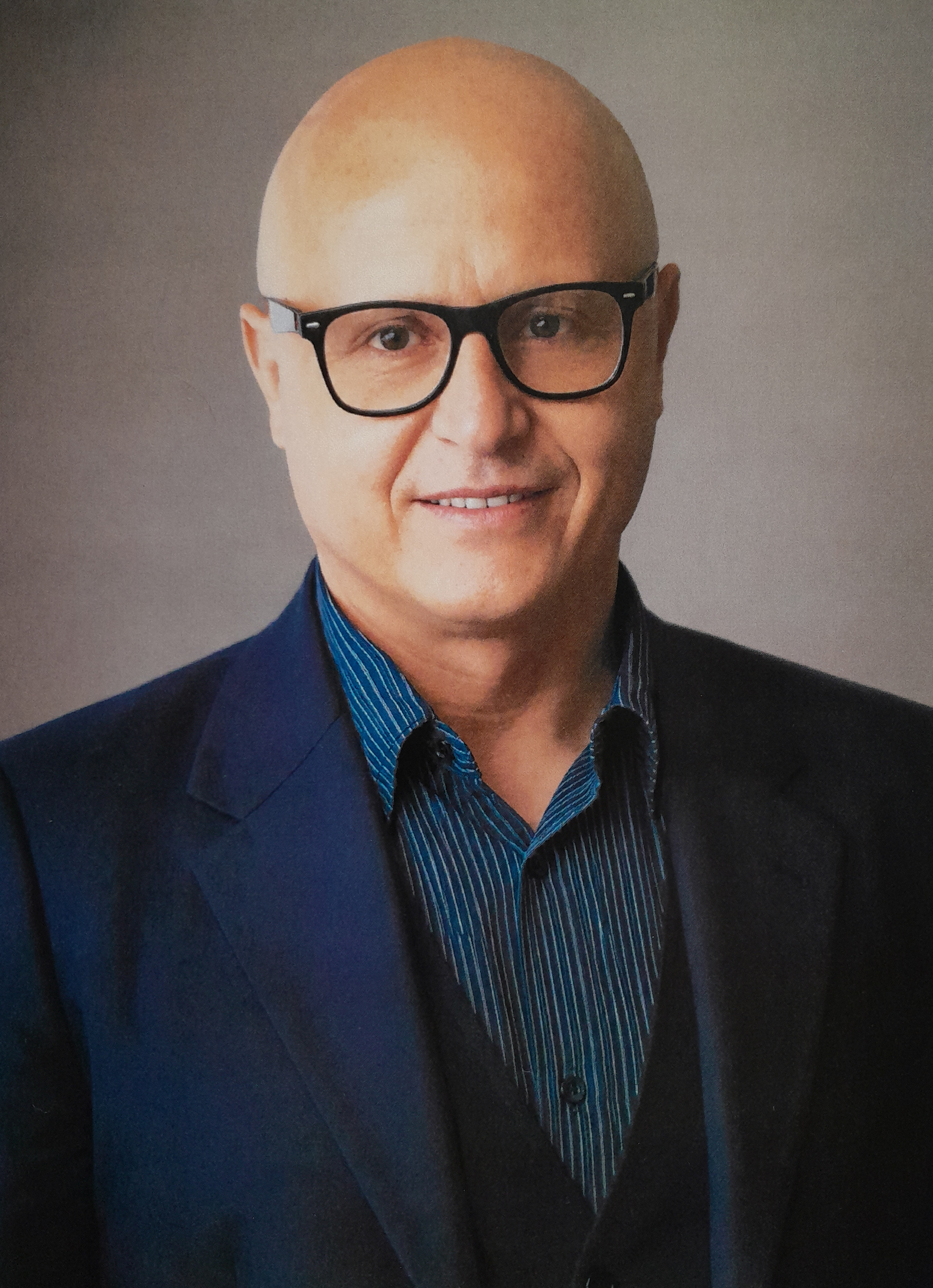
Anton Sammut

Anton Sammut (born 1970) is a Maltese author whose work includes philosophical writing on consciousness, spirituality and metaphysics, as well as fiction. His writings combine philosophical and spiritual themes with literary and narrative forms.

== Career ==
Sammut began publishing fiction with Alte Vestiga (2008), which was translated into English by Alfred Palma as Memories of Recurrent Echoes (2009). The novel is set in Bavaria, Germany, and follows its characters over the period from 1890 to 1990. In an earlier review of Alte Vestiga, Alfred Palma described it as a philosophical novel and discussed Sammut's wide-ranging intellectual interests.

His philosophical writing includes In-Naħa l-Oħra tal-Istorja Ġudeo-Kristjana (2011), published in English as The Other Side of the Judeo-Christian History (2012). The work examines Judeo-Christian history and offers alternative interpretations of biblical and Christian traditions. It was reviewed in The Times of Malta.

Sammut subsequently published Il-Filosofija tal-Ispiritwalità Kożmika (2013), followed by its English edition, The Philosophy of Cosmic Spirituality (2014). His later philosophical work Il-Filosofija tal-Moħħ (2015) was followed by Consciousness: The Concept of Mind and the Transcendence of Conventional Thought (2016). The latter examines questions relating to metaphysics, epistemology and transpersonal philosophy.

His fiction includes Paceville u Lil Hinn Minnu (2017), Metanoia: Anti-Rumanz (2018), Il-Vanġelu Sigriet ta' Ġesù (2020), and its English-language version The Secret Gospel of Jesus AD 0–78: A Historical Novel (2021). Further works include Paceville and Metanoia (2022), Iż-Żifna tad-Destin (2023), and The Heirs of the Lost Legacy: A Modern Odyssey in a Forgotten Past (2025). His 2026 novel Il-Maskra was reviewed in The Times of Malta by Karl Coleiro.

== Philosophy ==
Sammut's philosophical writings focus particularly on consciousness, spirituality and metaphysics. His concept of "cosmic spirituality", developed in The Philosophy of Cosmic Spirituality, explores spirituality outside conventional institutional and doctrinal frameworks. His work draws comparisons between Eastern and Western philosophical and spiritual traditions, including similarities between the teachings of the Buddha and Jesus.

In Consciousness: The Concept of Mind and the Transcendence of Conventional Thought, Sammut examines the nature of mind and consciousness through philosophical, metaphysical and transpersonal perspectives. His work has been described as engaging with questions concerning the relationship between consciousness, mind and reality.

A recurring feature of Sammut's writing is the combination of philosophical reflection with literary and narrative techniques. His fiction also incorporates philosophical and spiritual themes through its narratives and characters.

== Works ==
=== Non-fiction ===
- In-Naħa l-Oħra tal-Istorja Ġudeo-Kristjana (2011)
- The Other Side of the Judeo-Christian History (2012)
- Il-Filosofija tal-Ispiritwalità Kożmika (2013)
- The Philosophy of Cosmic Spirituality (2014)
- Il-Filosofija tal-Moħħ (2015)
- Consciousness: The Concept of Mind and the Transcendence of Conventional Thought (2016)

=== Fiction ===
- Alte Vestiga (2008)
- Memories of Recurrent Echoes (2009)
- Paceville u Lil Hinn Minnu (2017)
- Metanoia: Anti-Rumanz (2018)
- Il-Vanġelu Sigriet ta' Ġesù (2020)
- The Secret Gospel of Jesus AD 0–78: A Historical Novel (2021)
- Paceville and Metanoia (2022)
- Iż-Żifna tad-Destin (2023)
- The Heirs of the Lost Legacy: A Modern Odyssey in a Forgotten Past (2025)
- Il-Maskra (2026)
