= Ġużè Galea =

Ġużè Galea in 1938

Ġużè Galea (18 July 1901 – 26 March 1978) was a doctor and a Maltese author. He produced newspaper articles as well as novels. He was also the president of the Maltese Writer's Association and the head of the Maltese Health Dept.

== Studies and his Medical Career ==
Galea studied at the Archbishop's Seminary (1914–17) and later at St. Aloysius College (1918–20). He graduated as a pharmacist (Ph.C.) from the University of Malta in 1925 and as a doctor (M.D.) in 1928. He studied in London where he specialized in Public Health and took the Diploma in Public Health (D.P.H.) from the R.C.P.S. in 1932 and later became a member of the Royal Society of Health.

He pursued a career in the health service of the Maltese government. He was a resident medical officer from 1928 to 1930, a quarantined medical officer from 1932 to 1937, a public health medical officer from 1937 to 1947, a senior health officer from 1949 to 1951, and finally the medical officer head of government and superintendent of public health from 1951 to 1961.

At the University of Malta he was a lecturer in Forensic Medicine from 1949 to 1961

He has published several articles on medicine in Maltese and international journals and has been a member of various committees dealing with social and philanthropic work.

== Literature and History ==
Galea had a keen interest in history and wrote many historical novels. He has also written some interesting short historical biographies and articles in Melita Historica. Folklore was another field that he studied. He was President of the Maltese Academy from 1942 to 1973 and President of The Malta Society of Arts, Manufactures and Commerce from 1960 to 1966.

== Works ==
=== Romantic History ===
- Żmien l-Ispanjoli (1937)
- San Ġwann (1939)
- Raġel bil-Għaqal (1943)
- Meta Nħaraq it-Teatru (1946)
- Id-Dinja Rota (1966)

=== Historical ===
- Anton Manwel Caruana (1939)
- Maurice Magnus: His Stay in Malta (1943)
- Il-Kanonku Caruana bħala Diplomatiku (1947)
- Coleridge in Malta (1948)
- Kittieb Spanjol f'Malta (1950)

=== Notable Articles ===
- Malta and the Second World War: A Bibliography (1952)
- A Captain of the Port of Malta and a Grand Vizier of Constantinople (1964)
- The Great Siege of Malta from a Turkish Point of View (1965)
- The Quarantine Service and the Lazzaretto of Malta (1966)
- The Sea Board and Marshes of Qormi (1968)

=== Folklore ===
- The Taglia and the Taċċa (1962)
- Old Flour Mills of Malta (1963)
- Xogħol u Snajja' tal-Imgħoddi (1969)
