= Doreen Micallef =

Maltese poet and playwright (1949–2001)

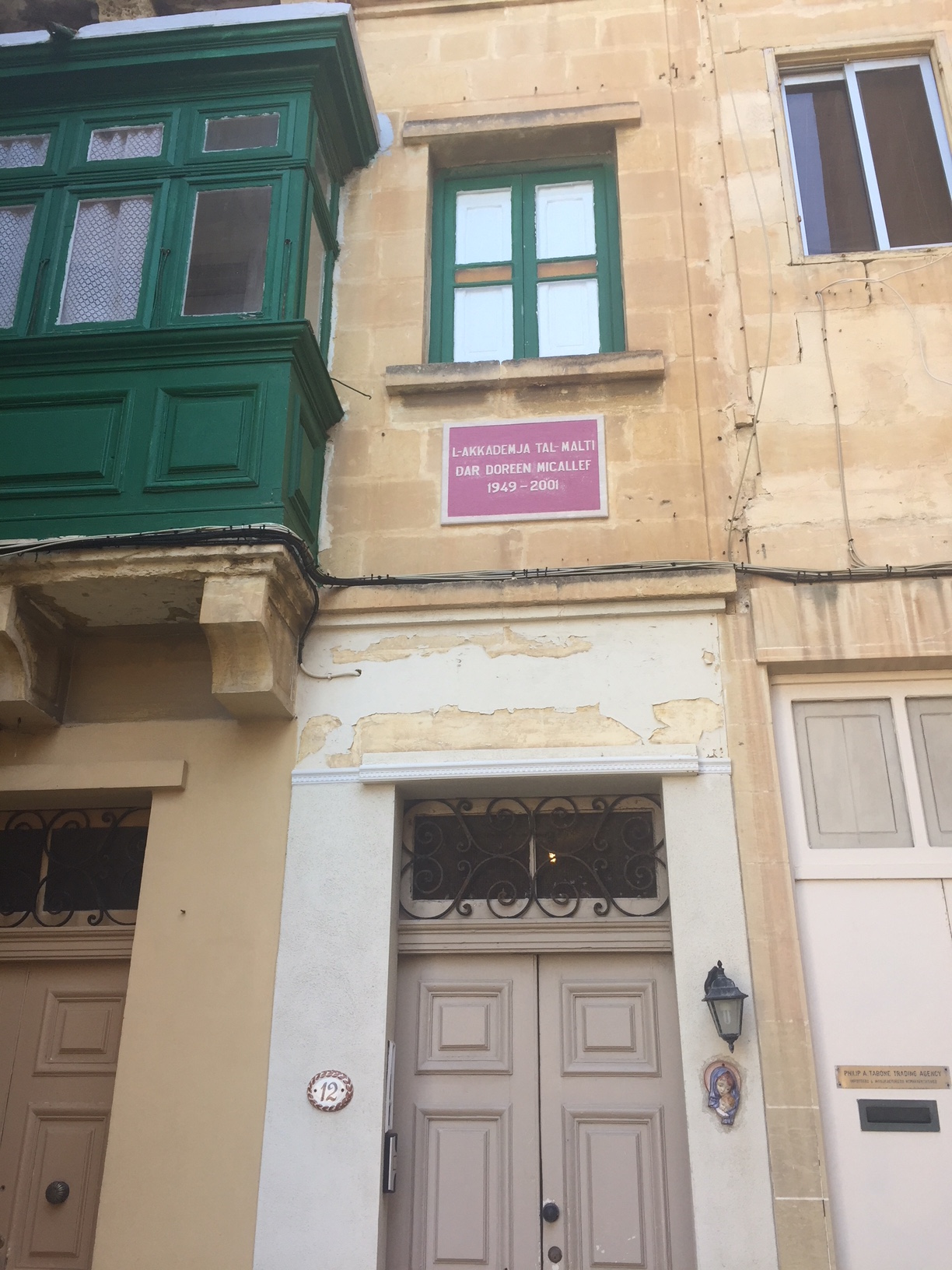
Micallef's home in Malta, now the headquarters of the Maltese Academy

Doreen Micallef (1 June 1949 – 1 December 2001) was a Maltese poet and playwright.

== Career ==
She has been cited as an example of Malta's post World War II emergence of female authors and poets. Micallef's work has also been noted for introducing poetry into Maltese plays. In 2011, Micallef's home in Valletta was restored by the Maltese Academy, an organization that promotes the use of the Maltese language in Malta. Upon the completion of the restoration, the home became the organization's headquarters.

== Works ==
- Face to face and playwriting Other (1972)
- Within the Third Circle
- In the Empirew Street (1975)
- De Profundis (1979)
- Kyrie (1980)
