= The Hiding Place (Azzopardi novel) =

Novel by Trezza Azzopardi

- First edition cover
- Author: Trezza Azzopardi
- Publisher: Picador
- Publication date: 2000
- Award: Geoffrey Faber Memorial Prize (2001)
- ISBN: 978-0-330-39075-0

The Hiding Place was the debut novel of British writer Trezza Azzopardi. It tells the story of the six daughters of a Maltese family growing up in Cardiff through the eyes of the youngest, Dolores Gauci. She describes her childhood life.

The Hiding Place was shortlisted for the 2000 Booker Prize and won the 2001 Geoffrey Faber Memorial Prize.

== Awards ==
Awards for The Hiding Place
Year	Award	Category	Result	Ref.
2000	Booker Prize		Shortlisted	
2000	Guardian First Book Award		Longlisted	
2000	James Tait Black Memorial Prize	Fiction	Shortlisted	
2001	Geoffrey Faber Memorial Prize		Won	
2001	Orange Prize		Longlisted	
