= Trezza Azzopardi =

British writer

- Born: 1961 (age 64–65); Cardiff, Wales
- Occupation: Writer

Trezza Azzopardi (born 1961) is a Welsh writer who has been shortlisted for the Booker Prize and won several other literary prizes.

== Early life ==
Azzopardi was born in Cardiff to a Maltese father and a Welsh mother. She studied creative writing at the University of East Anglia, and currently works as a lecturer there. She also has an MA in Film and Television studies from the University of Derby.

== Career ==
Azzopardi's novel The Hiding Place (2000), is about Maltese immigrants living in the 1960s. Unusually for a first novel, it was shortlisted for the Booker Prize in 2000. It also won the Geoffrey Faber Memorial Prize and was shortlisted for the James Tait Black Memorial Prize. Her second novel, Remember Me (2003), was shortlisted for the Wales Book of the Year. Winterton Blue (2007) was longlisted for the 2008 Wales Book of the Year. She also writes short stories and performs readings for BBC radio. Her books have been translated into 17 languages.

Azzopardi currently lives in Norwich, in the east of England.

== Bibliography ==
- —— (2000). The Hiding Place. Picador. ISBN 9780871138156.
- —— (2003). Remember Me. Picador. ISBN 9780330493475.
- —— (2007). Winterton Blue. Grove Press. ISBN 9780802118417.
- —— (2010). The Song House. Picador. ISBN 9780330461030.
