= Pottinger =

Pottinger or Pöttinger may refer to:

== People ==
Pottinger

- Allison Pottinger (b. 1973), American curler
- Damien Pottinger (b. 1982), Canadian professional soccer player
- Don Pottinger (1919–1986), Scottish officer of arms and heraldic author
- Doug Pottinger (b. 1973), American curler
- Eldred Pottinger (1811–1843), Anglo-Indian soldier and diplomat
- Frederick William Pottinger (1831–1865), Australian police inspector
- George Pottinger (1916–1998), Scottish civil servant involved in the John Poulson scandal
- Henry Pottinger (1789–1856), British soldier and first governor of Hong Kong
- Henry Pottinger Stephens (1851–1903), English dramatist and journalist
- Jay Pottinger (b. 1983), Canadian football linebacker
- John Stanley Pottinger (1940–2024), American lawyer, banker, novelist
- Julie Pottinger (b. 1970), American historical romance novelist
- Matthew Pottinger (b. 1973), American journalist and U.S. Marine, son of John Stanley Pottinger
- Rose Rita Pottinger, fictional character in the Lewis Barnavelt book series
- Sonia Pottinger (1931-2010), Jamaican reggae record producer
- Tinks Pottinger (b. 1956), New Zealand horsewoman and bronze medalist

Pöttinger

- Josef Pöttinger (1903–1970), German football player
- Markus Pöttinger (b. 1978), former ice hockey player of Munich

== Places ==
- Pottinger (District Electoral Area), Belfast, Northern Ireland
  - Belfast Pottinger (Northern Ireland Parliament constituency) (1922-1973)
  - Belfast Pottinger (UK Parliament constituency) (1918–1922)
- Pottinger County, New South Wales, Australia
- Pottinger Peak, Hong Kong
- Pottinger Point, South Shetland Islands, Antarctica
- Pottinger Street, Hong Kong

== Other ==
- Bell Pottinger, a London-based public relations company
- Pottinger (Australia), an Australian M&A advisory company
- Pottinger Baronets

== See also ==
- Pettinger, a similar surname
