= Pottinger baronets =

Extinct baronetcy in the Baronetage of the United Kingdom

- Escutcheon of the Pottinger baronets of Richmond
- Creation date: 1840
- Status: extinct
- Extinction date: 1909
- Motto: Virtus in ardua, Virtue in the face of difficulties

The Pottinger Baronetcy, of Richmond in the County of Surrey, was a title in the Baronetage of the United Kingdom. It was created on 27 April 1840 for Lieutenant-General Henry Pottinger, the first Governor of Hong Kong from 1843 to 1844. His eldest son, the second Baronet, emigrated to Australia where he became a police inspector. The latter was succeeded by his younger brother, the third Baronet. On his death in 1909 the title became extinct.

Eldred Pottinger was the nephew of the first Baronet.

== Pottinger baronets, of Richmond (1840) ==
- Sir Henry Pottinger, 1st Baronet (1789–1856)
- Sir Frederick William Pottinger, 2nd Baronet (1831–1865)
- Sir Henry Pottinger, 3rd Baronet (1834–1909)
