= Pettinger =

Pettinger is a surname. Notable people with the surname include:

- Aldam Pettinger (1859-1950), Australian sportsman
- Andy Pettinger (born 1984), English footballer
- Billy Pettinger (born 1982), Canadian singer and songwriter
- Donald R. Pettinger (born 1961), American jockey
- Eric Pettinger (1904–1968), Canadian ice hockey player, brother of Gord
- Glenn Pettinger (1928–2019), Canadian basketball player
- Gord Pettinger (1911–1986), Canadian ice hockey player
- John Pettinger (born 1953), British Army officer
- Matt Pettinger (born 1980), Canadian ice hockey player
- Paul Pettinger (born 1975), English footballer
- Rosi Pettinger (born 1933), German figure skater
- Tejvan Pettinger (born 1976), English cyclist

== See also ==
- Pottinger (disambiguation)
