= Msida Bastion Historic Garden =

Former cemetery in Malta

Msida Bastion Historic Garden (Garden of Rest)
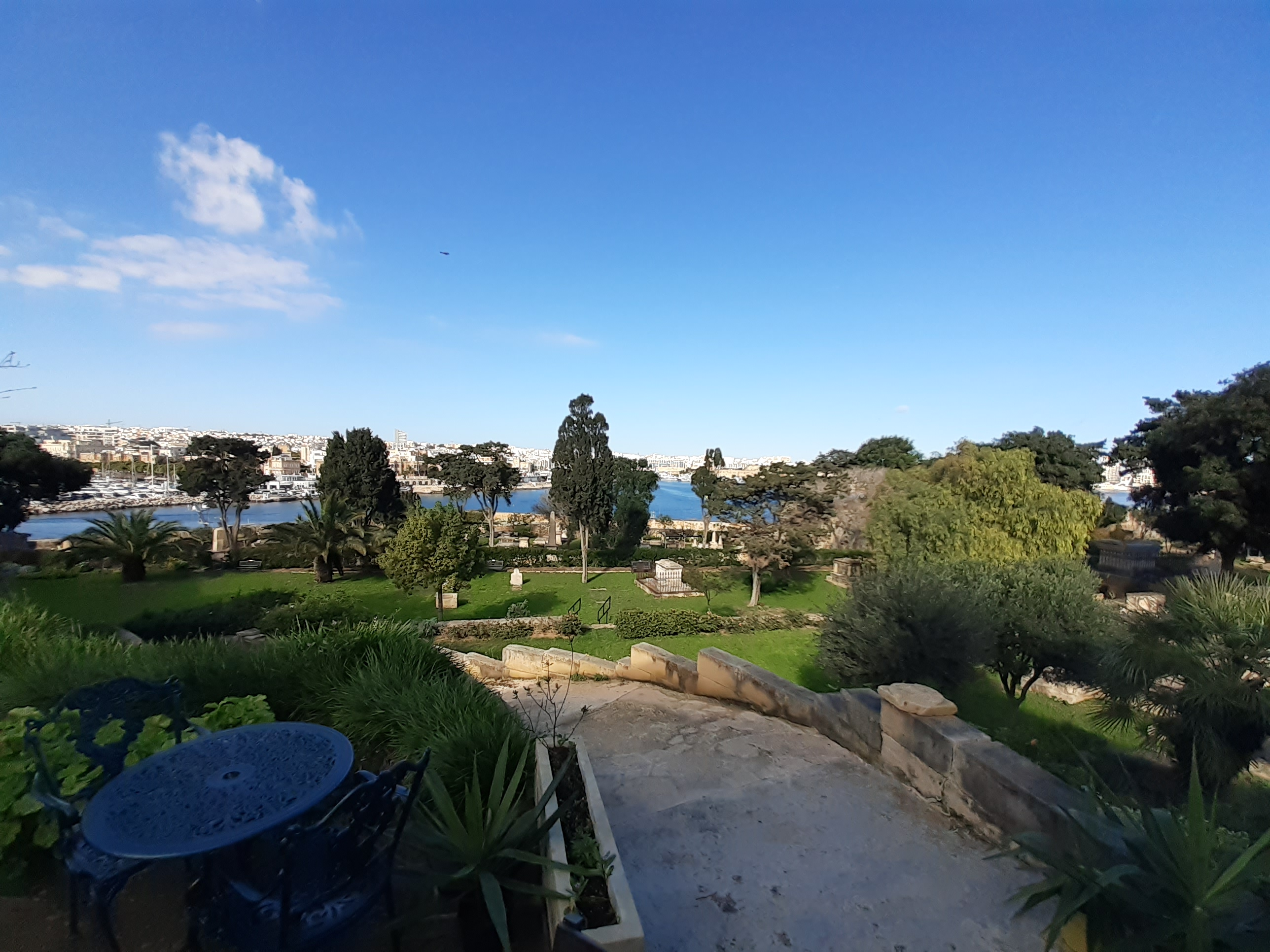
- Interactive map of Msida Bastion Historic Garden (Garden of Rest)

Details
- Established: 1806
- Closed: 1856
- Location: Floriana, Malta
- Coordinates: 35°53′45″N 14°30′8″E
- Style: Neoclassical

The Msida Bastion Historic Garden, also Msida Bastion Cemetery or Msida Bastion Garden of Rest is a former Protestant cemetery in Floriana, Malta, in use from 1806 till 1856. It was restored and reopened as a garden in 2002. It is listed in the National Inventory of the Cultural Property of the Maltese Islands under number 52, as a Grade 1 Monument. Currently, Din l-Art Ħelwa are the caretakers of the Msida Bastions with a team of over 25 volunteers coordinated by the garden's Warden, all aiding in the general upkeep and research of the site.

== History ==
The Cemetery lies within the former St Philip's Bastion, an outer fortification completed in 1653. Under the rule of the Order of Malta, the gallows stood on an area above the site.

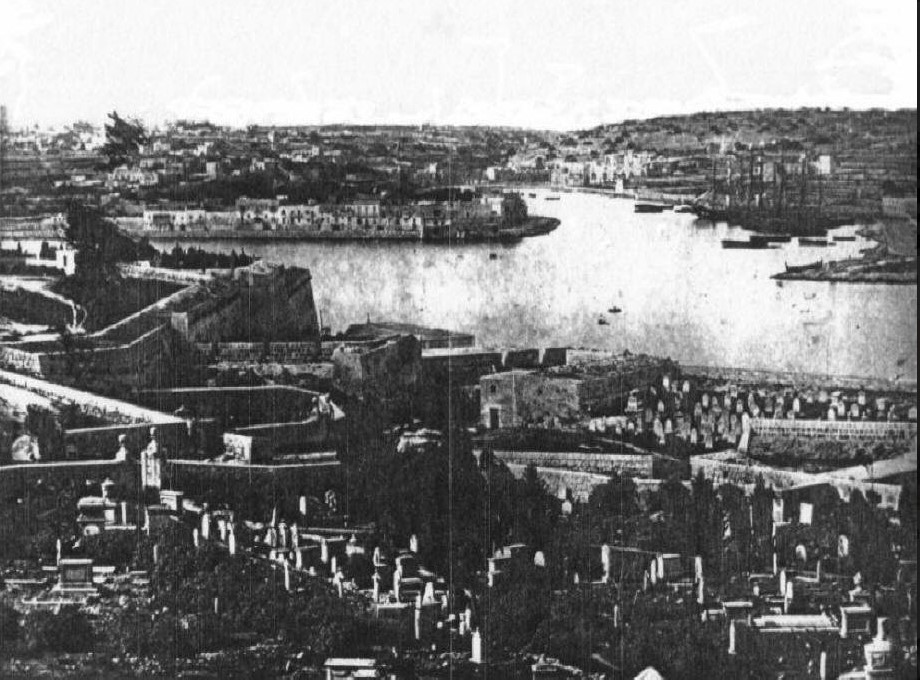
The Gallows area (Taht il-Forka) around 1870; the Msida bastion is visible on the left

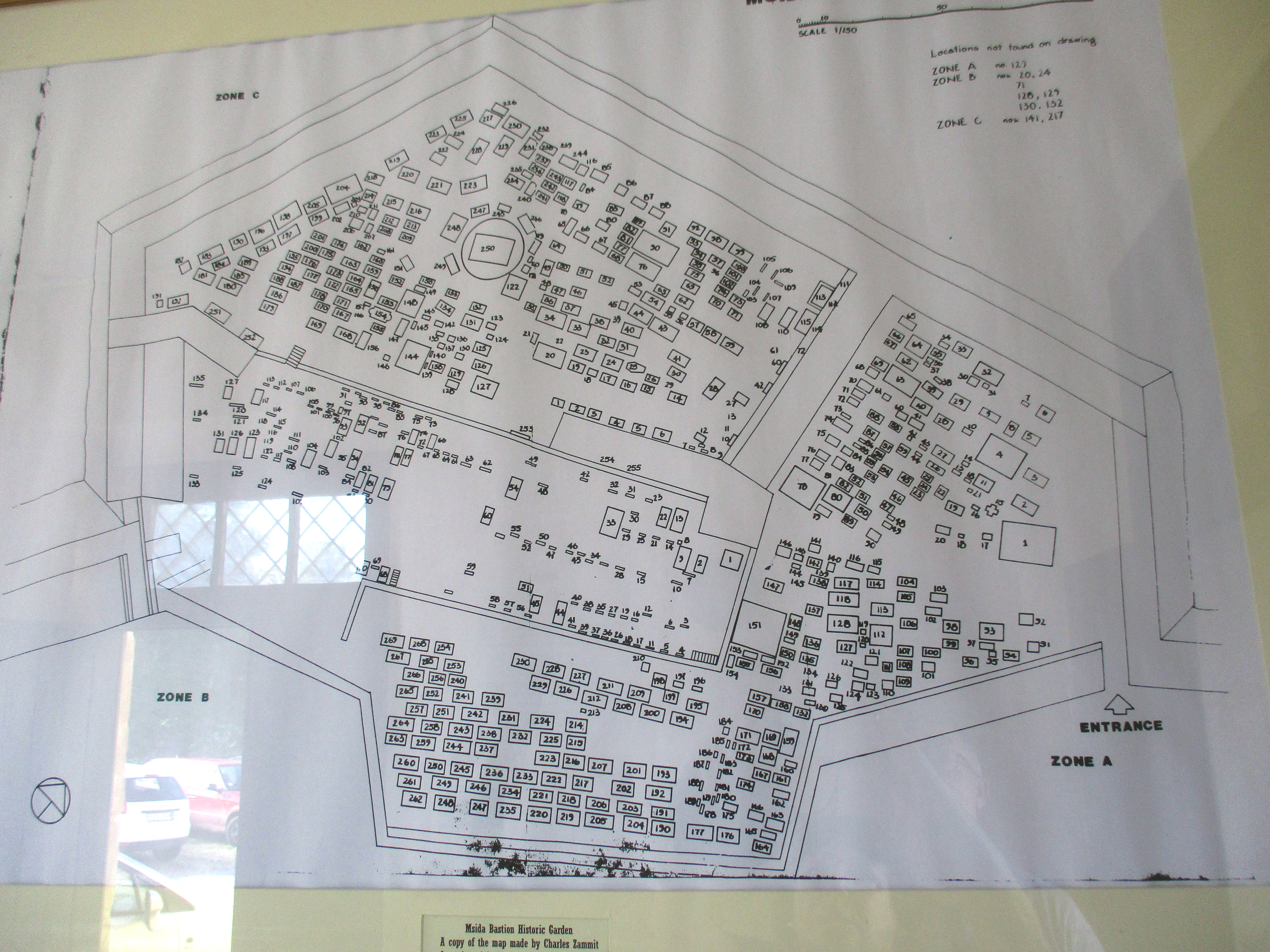
1930 map by Captain Charles Zammit, splitting the site into 3 sectors

After the British Empire took control of the Maltese archipelago at the beginning of the 19th century, a non-Catholic cemetery for British sailors was laid out in 1806. St. Philip's Bastion was the ideal location for a Protestant cemetery due to its being outside the walls of Valletta, thus avoiding clashes with the sometimes fanatical Roman Catholic Maltese. Later, Anglican and Protestant soldiers, administrative officials, merchants and their family members, as well as other foreigners and some Maltese, found their final resting place there.

The use of the cemetery ended around 1857 after the Ta' Braxia Cemetery in Gwardamanġa (Pietà) was established, however burials in existing graves would continue with the last known burial occurring in 1871. In the second half of the century, the tombs fell into disrepair, with many of them being vandalised and robbed, the general area also became overgrown. In 1930, Captain Charles Zammit (son of Sir Themistocles Zammit) came to the cemetery to document the various tombs and names. Captain Zammit also created the first known plan of the cemetery, splitting it into 3 different sectors (A/B/C) and took various photographs. During the Second World War, the former cemetery also suffered several bomb hits, which damaged several graves and part of the bastion walls.

Thanks to the fertile soil and the protected location, the Garden of Rest has developed into a refuge for plants and animals. Some of the trees there are more than 150 years old.

== Burial techniques ==
Graves within the garden seem to follow a standard dimension, 6 feet deep by 7 feet long by 2 feet wide. The grave would be dug into the soil with part of it being dug into the stone. The debris from the excavation would be used to level the ground during the construction of the grave. It would be built out of Maltese Globigerina Limestone blocks and plastered with hydraulic lime. The floor of the grave is usually one foot of soil however, there are a few instances where the floor of the grave would also be made out of stone. Additionally, the grave would also have two thin, perpendicular stone blocks at the bottom for the coffin to rest on, thus making it easier for the undertakers to recover the ropes during burial. The grave would be sealed with 3 blocks, two large ones and one smaller one between them, hydraulic lime would be used to fill the gap.

Often people would be buried with their prized possessions and if they formed part of the military, in uniform. The coffins would also be adorned with metal plates showing designs of angels, bouquets of flowers along with the name of the deceased. The richer the deceased may have been, the more precious the items also buried in the grave. This unfortunately made them a frequent target of grave robbers. They would destroy the monument on top of the grave then, break through the three slabs sealing the grave and finally break through the coffin at which point they would find their treasure. Stories still exist to this day of grave robbers stealing swords and buttons from abandoned graves.

== Notable funerary monuments ==
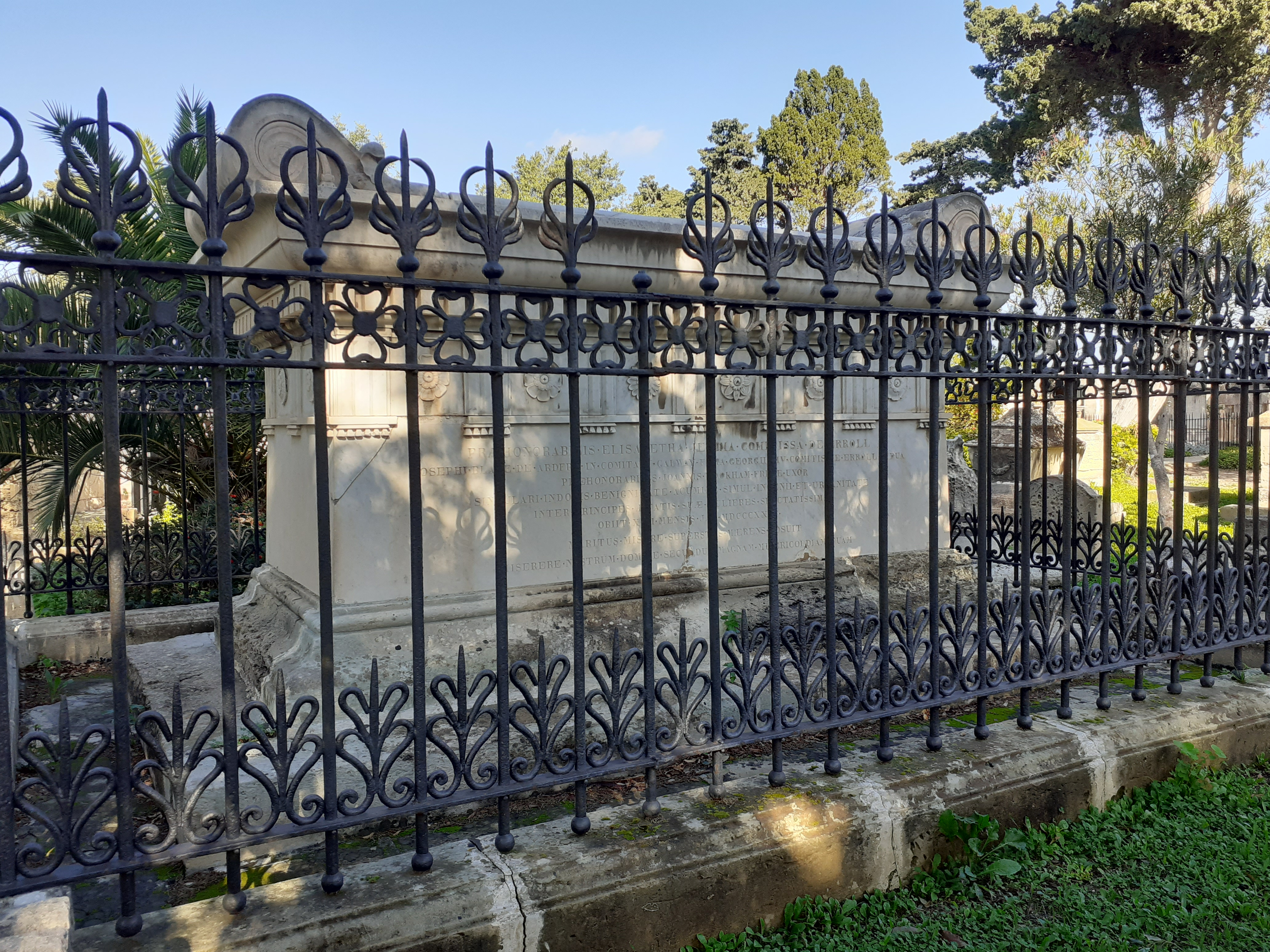
Tomb of John Hookham Frere and his wife Elizabeth

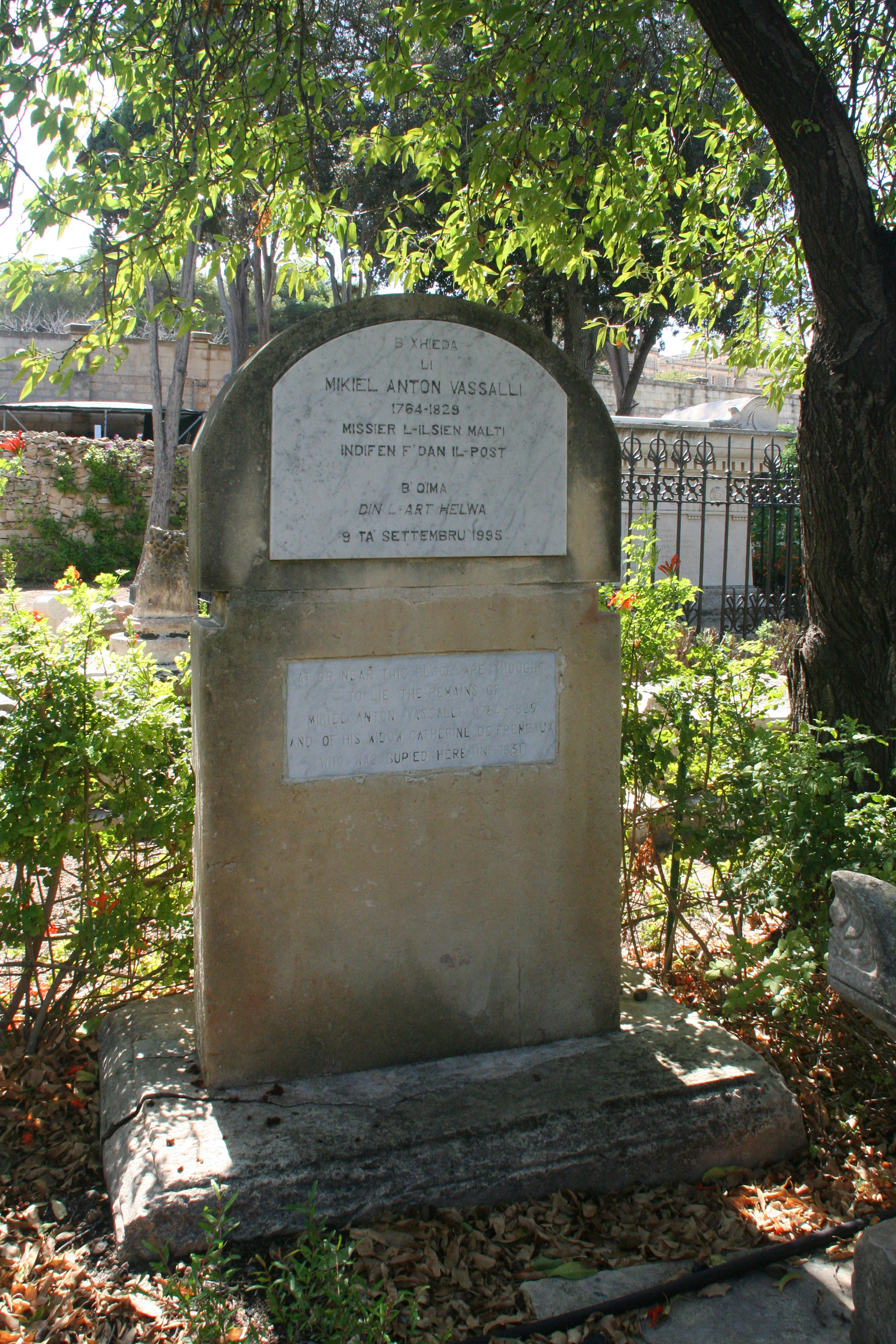
Gravestone of Mikiel Anton Vassalli

At least 528 people were buried here, according to the records. However, modern estimates put this number at over 900 individuals buried in the cemetery. The most elaborate tombs reflect the Neoclassic period in Malta, with ample use of forms taken from Greek and Roman styles (obelisks, pyramids, sarcophagi) and little use of crosses or other Christian symbols. There are only three crosses present in the Msida Bastion, one of which is the Orthodox Cross.

- Mikiel Anton Vassalli (1764–1829), the founder of Maltese linguistics; Because he had translated the New Testament into the Maltese language against the will of the Roman Catholic hierarchy, that Church denied him burial and he was buried in the Msida Bastion Cemetery. Records in St Paul's Pro-Cathedral confirm that he was indeed buried within the Msida Bastion Cemetery, however, the exact location of his grave is still unknown. His wife, Catherine de Fremeaux, was also buried there in 1851.
- Vice-admiral Sir Henry Hotham (19 February 1777 – 19 April 1833); then Commander-in-Chief of the Mediterranean Fleet, is arguably the most notable person buried in the Msida Bastion Garden. Hotham died suddenly in Malta at the age of 56 in 1833, after having served during the French Revolutionary and Napoleonic Wars and the War of 1812.
- Sir Henry Pottinger (3 October 1789 – 18 March 1856); first Governor of Hong Kong,
- John Hookham Frere (21 May 1769 – 7 January 1846); An elaborate funerary monument (an exact copy of the Roman tomb of Scipio Barbatus) is to Frere, a British diplomat and author, and his wife Elizabeth Jemima Blake (died 1831), widow of George Hay, 16th Earl of Erroll, and a sister of Joseph Blake, 1st Baron Wallscourt. Frere's sister Susanna also has a separate grave and memorial nearby.
- Charlotte Hope; a daughter of the Scottish judge Lord Hope
- Hannah Baker; widow of William Baker of HM Ordnance Dept, who died aged 52 in 1834; the monument, with a resting figure covered by a shroud, presents bas-reliefs with the Greek god Morpheus, a winged clessidra and ouroboros, and allegories of her life, and is surrounded by a wrought iron fence with a skull and phoenixes.
- Charles Harper; magistrate and editor of the Malta Government Gazette, he has a very ornate and elaborate monument adorned with seashells and a caring of a dog which has since been lost to time.
- The only Orthodox sepulture is the one of Egor Antonovich Schlippenbach, a Baltic German from Livonia, who died on 20 March 1830 at the command of the frigate Alexandra of the Russian Tzarist Navy. His is the oldest Orthodox tomb in Malta.
- A memorial is dedicated to the four seamen killed on board HMS Castor at the capture of St. Jean d'Acre on 3 November 1840, during the second Egyptian–Ottoman War.
- One of the most ornate monuments which is currently under restoration is dedicated to the 61 people who died, mostly of cholera, aboard HMS Queen during the ship's tour of Malta between 1849 and 1850. Among them was Raphaele Fasanelli of Naples, one of the first Italians serving as a Bandsman on a Royal Navy ship. The monument is adorned with a statuary figure believed to be that of Bellona. She stands with three cannonballs, an anchor, and a cannon at her feet. During the period when the Msida Bastion was abandoned, the monument was heavily vandalised, with the statue being beheaded, thus casting doubt on whether Bellona is its true identity. The plinth of the monument was also destroyed. The pieces of the marble tablet with the inscribed names of the sailors was broken and scattered throughout the garden; some fragments disappeared, making the restoration process even more difficult. However, restoration efforts have started and multiple fragments of the monument itself and of the marble tablet have been recovered, aiding volunteers in their restoration efforts.

== Restoration efforts ==
During the 80s, a national debate arose regarding the exact burial place of Mikiel Anton Vassalli after historians challenged the common belief that Vassalli was buried in a grave which now lies beneath the Excelsior Hotel in Floriana. Church records were brought to light which indicated that Vassalli was indeed buried in the Msida Bastion, however, no exact location within the cemetery was given. This new information sparked fresh interest in the site and in 1988, the then Minister of Education Ugo Mifsud Bonnici promised that the site would be restored and made available as a public garden. It was demarcated by a high wall and a gate to prevent vandalism. The restoration work, which was carried out by volunteers under the responsibility of the National Trust of Malta, Din l-Art Ħelwa (headed by R.G. Kirkpatrick first and then by Andy Welsh), lasted until 2002 when it was awarded Europa Nostra's the silver medal. A small Museum of Maltese Burial Practices was added in 2004 in the former Officers' Stable building.

In 2014 the National Geographic Society named Msida Bastion Cemetery one of the five most beautiful cemeteries in Europe: "Scattered-about benches offer the opportunity for reflection and a tranquil spot to take in the view of sailboats anchored at the marina below, verdant expanses of grass dotted with olive trees, palms, oleanders and ancient pines. Other botanical delights include colourful flower blooms - some visible year-round - such as hibiscus, oleander and blue Mexican petunias.".

Currently, research into the site is still ongoing with the help of various Din l'Art Helwa volunteers. However, the original burial registry for the cemetery has been lost to time and so volunteers rely on finds within the cemetery itself and the archives of St Paul's Pro-Cathedral to piece together the rich history of the place.

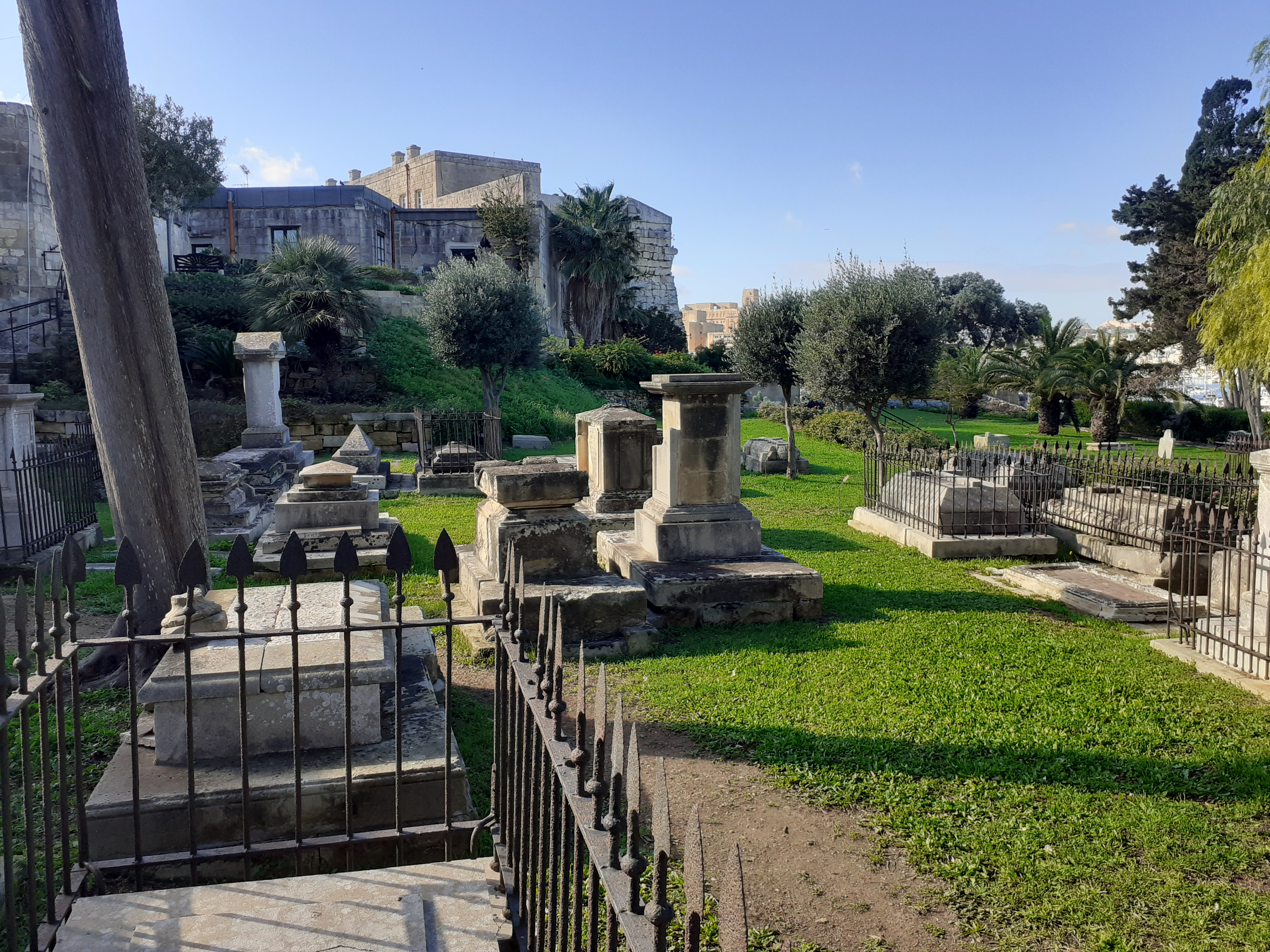
View of the Msida Bastion

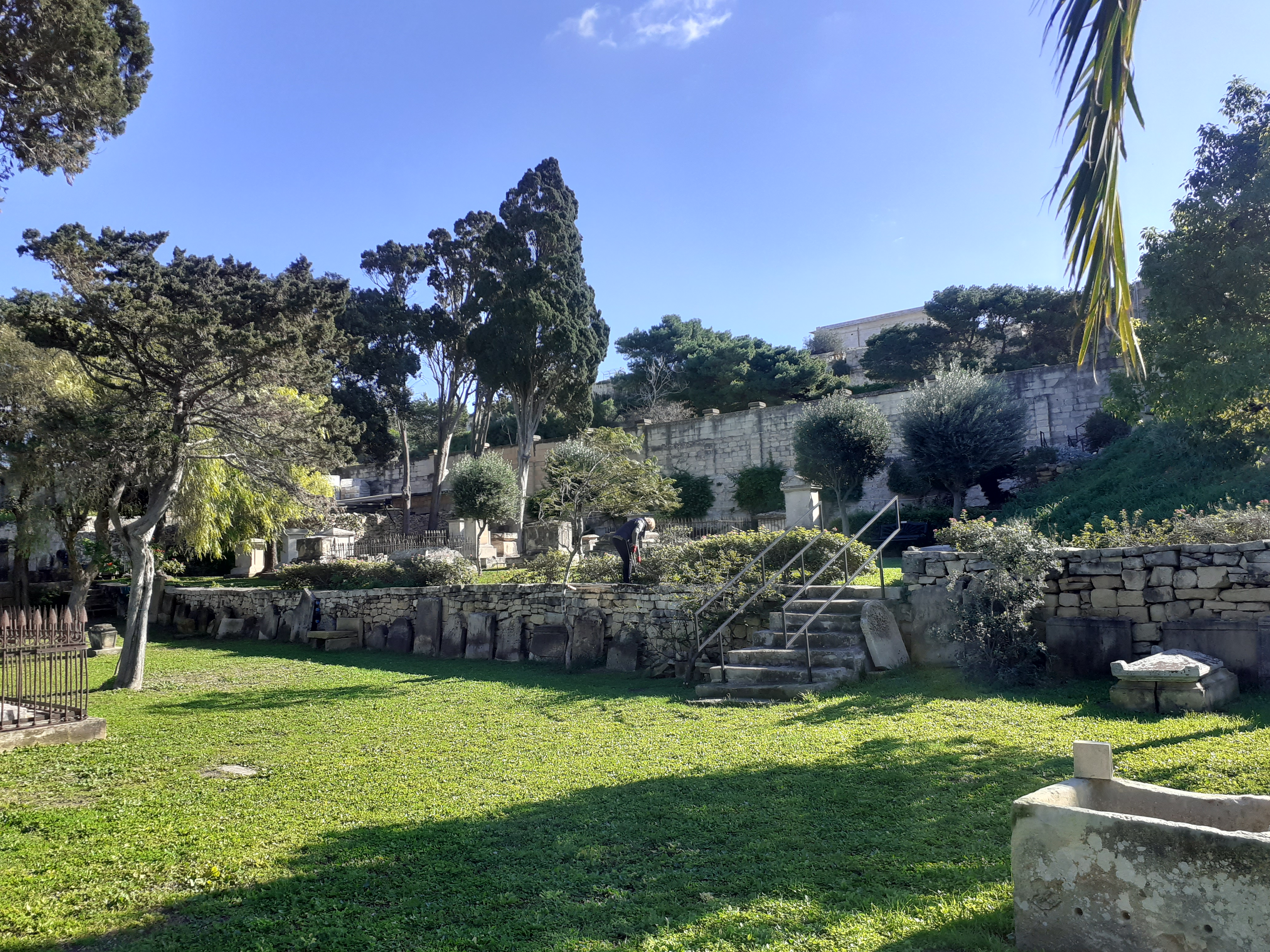
View of the Msida Bastion

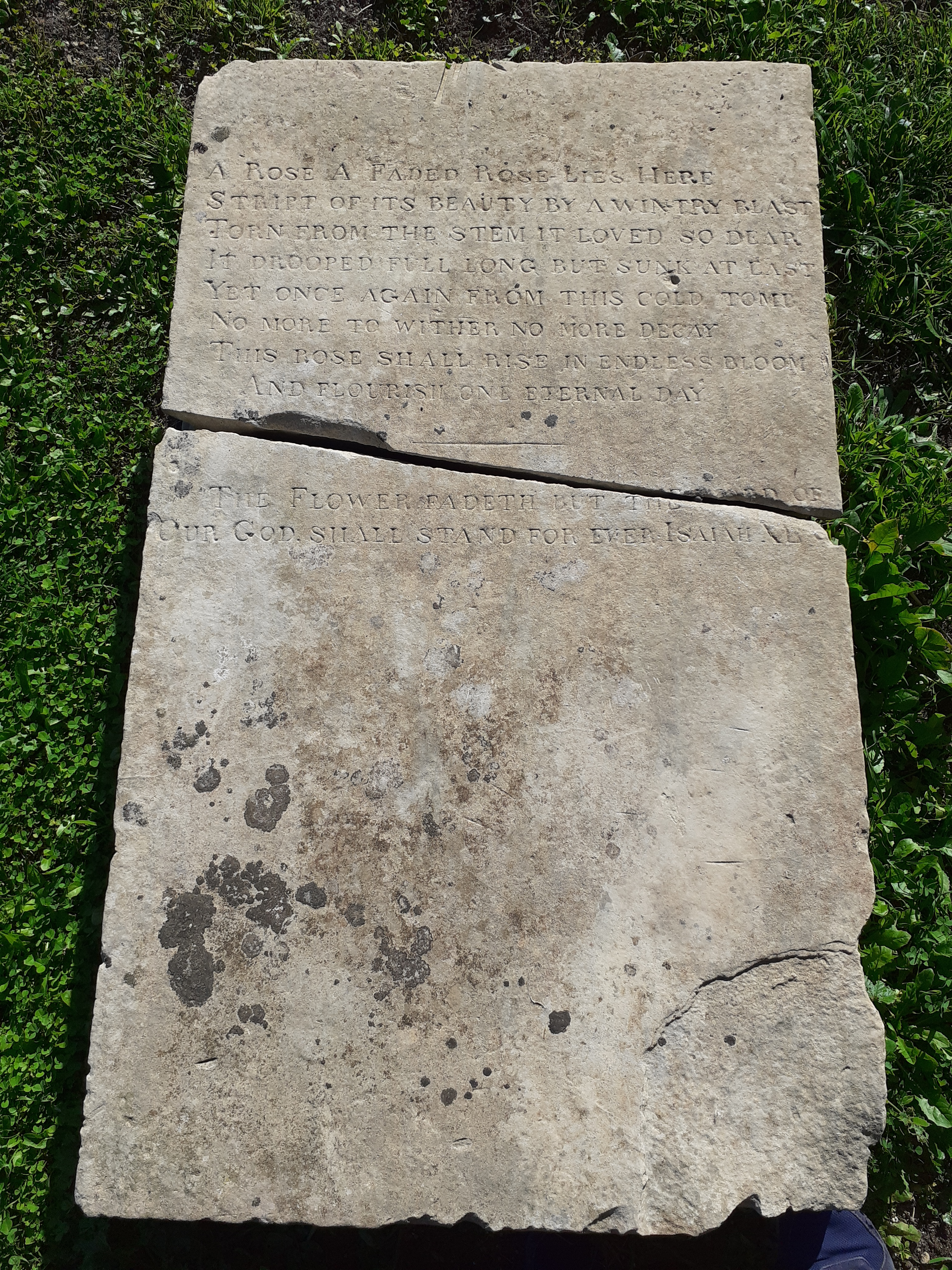
Broken stone tablet with inscriptions

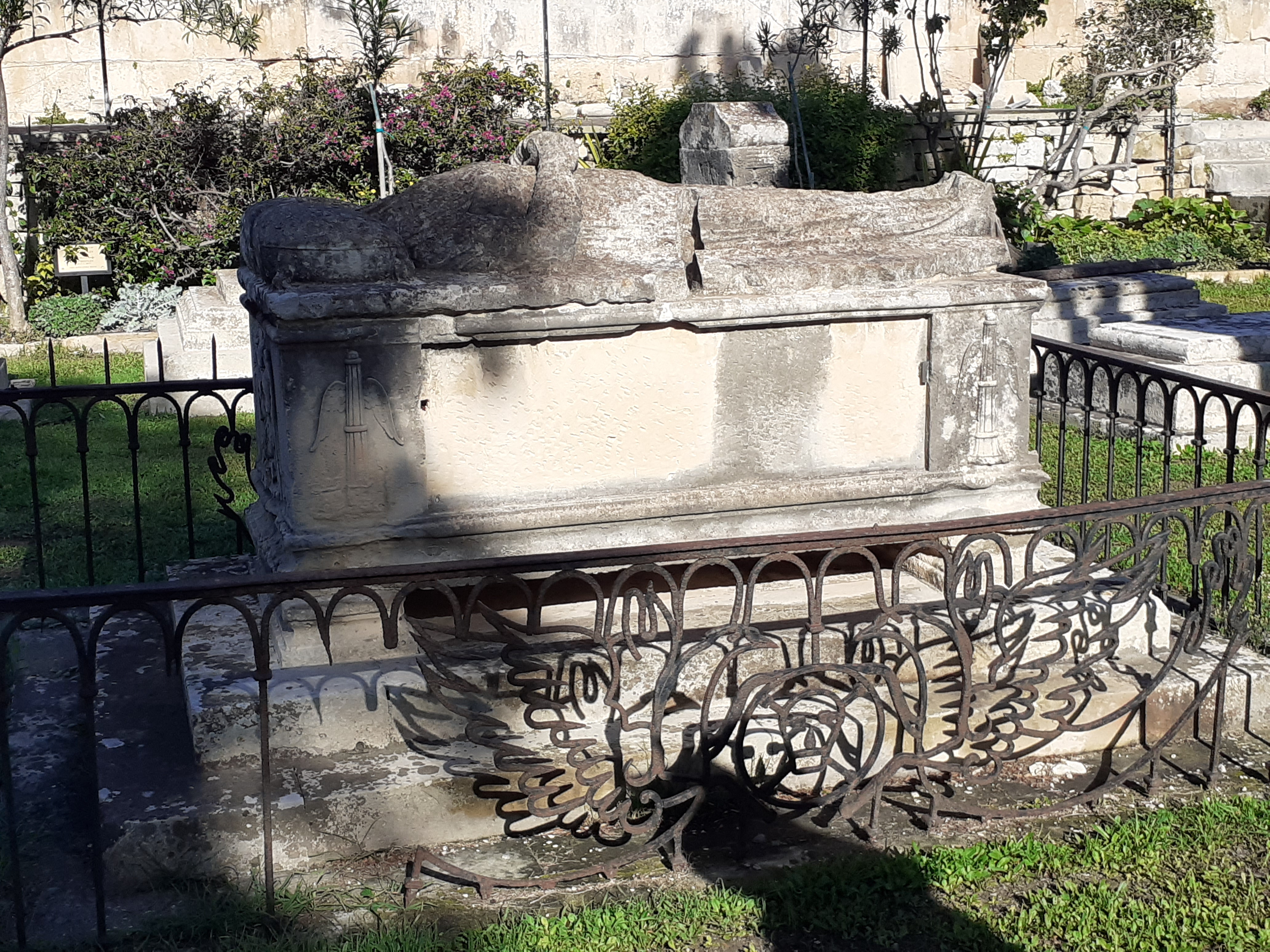
The Greek-style ornate funerary monument to Hannah Baker, widow of William Baker (1834)

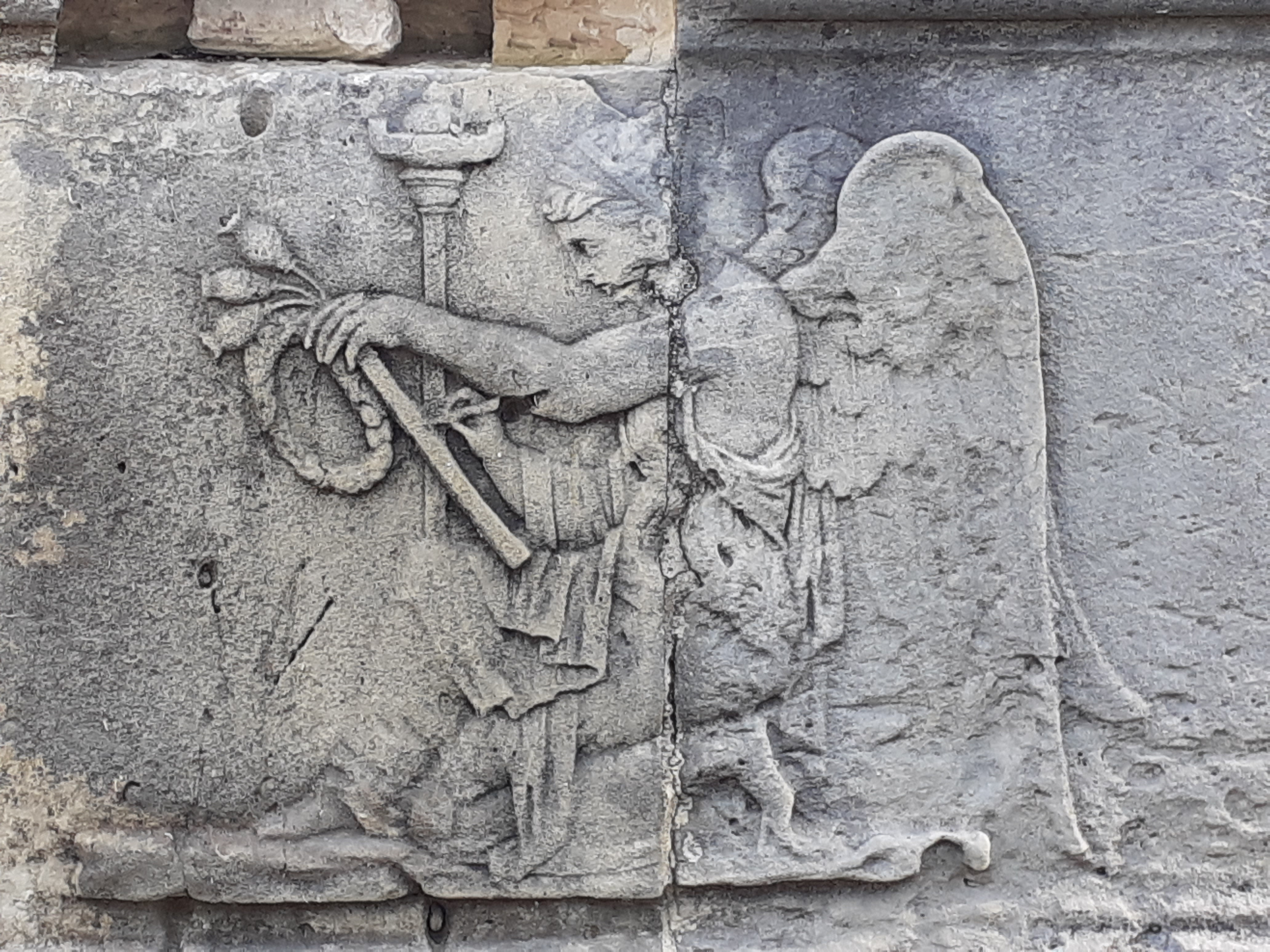
Bas-relief of Morpheus, Greek god of dreams

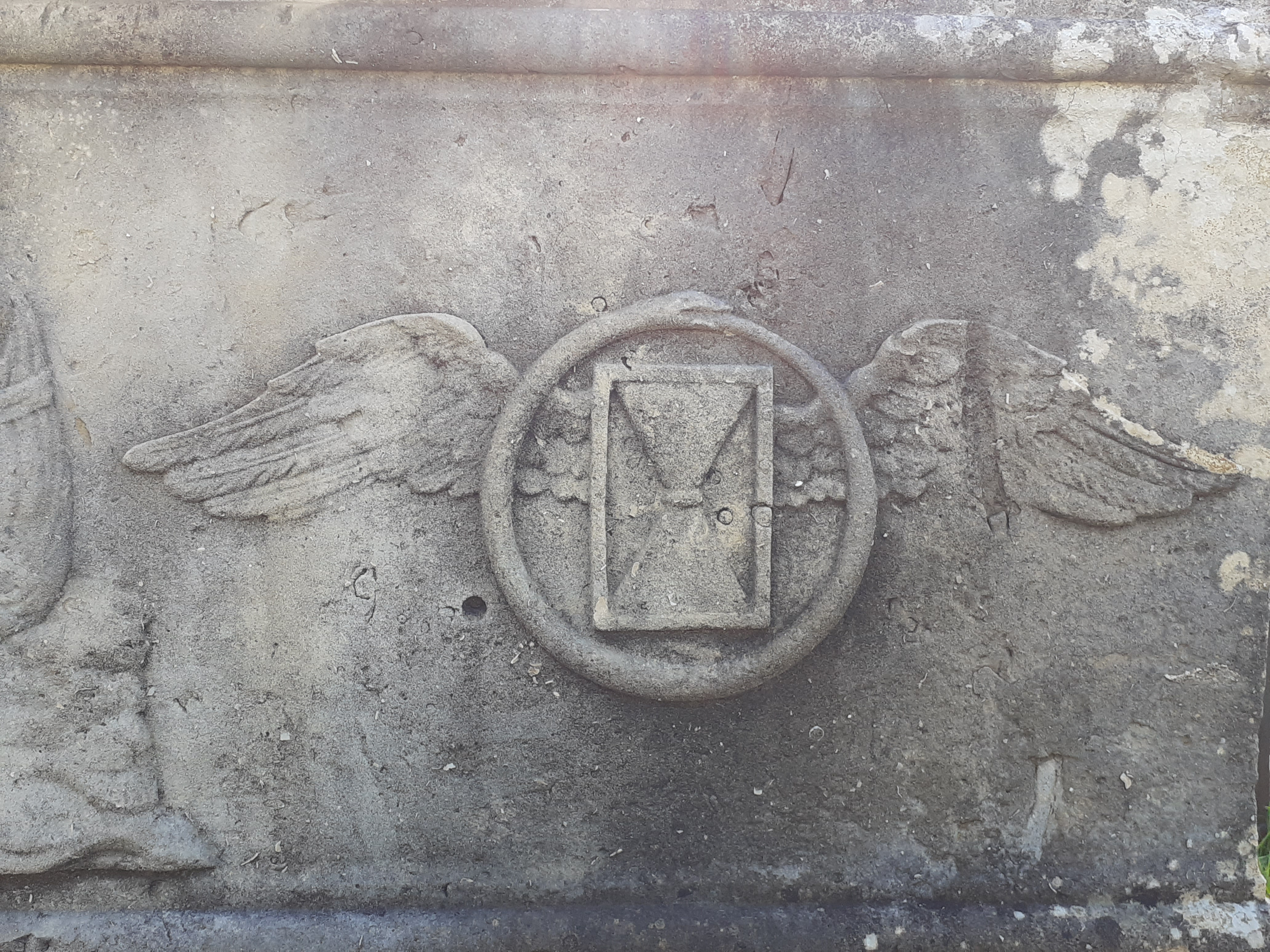
Bas-relief with winged clessidra and ouroboros

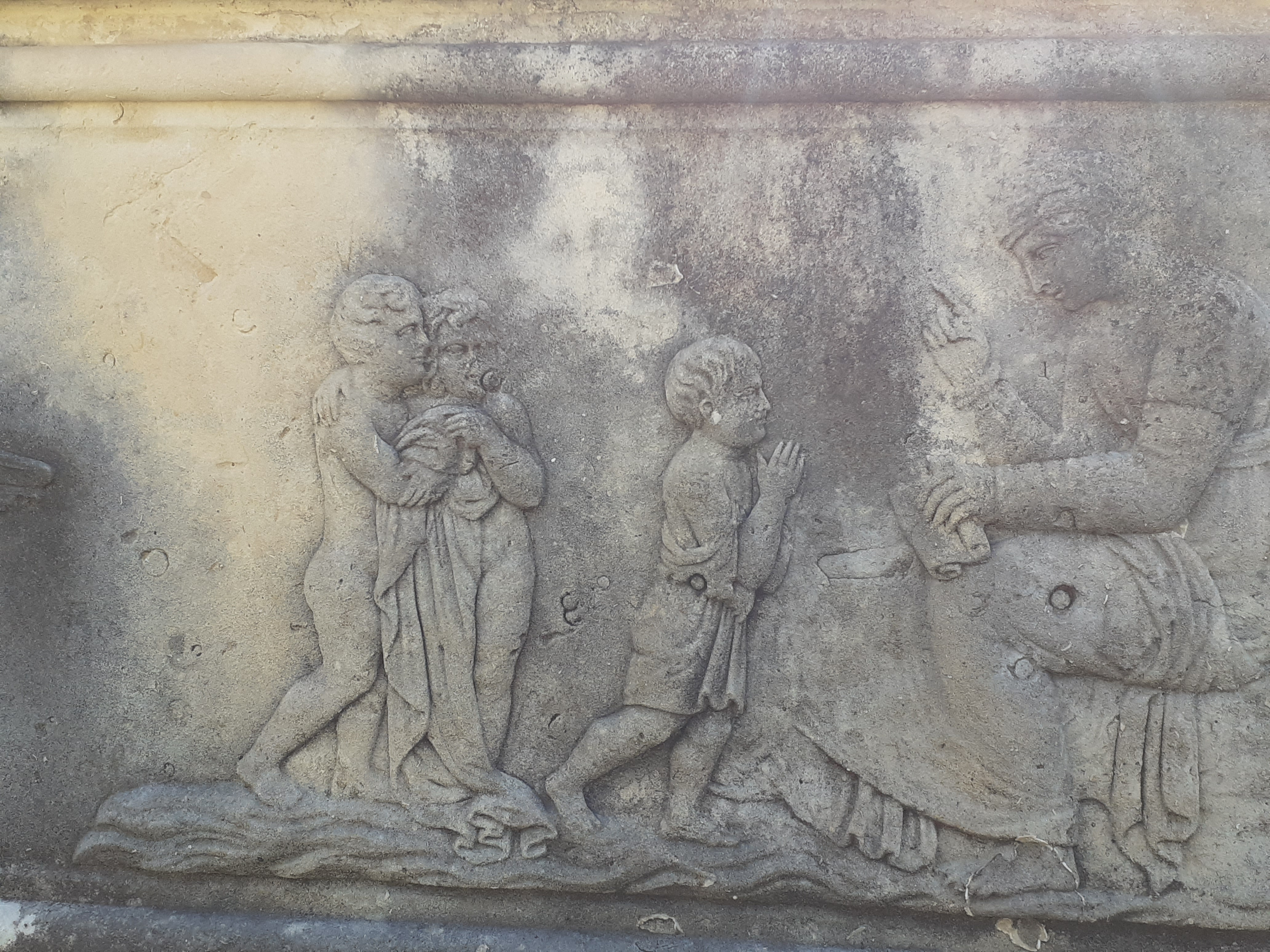
Allegory of Hannah Baker's life episodes
