= Henry Pottinger =

Bombay Army officer and colonial administrator

The Right Honourable Henry Pottinger Bt GCB PC
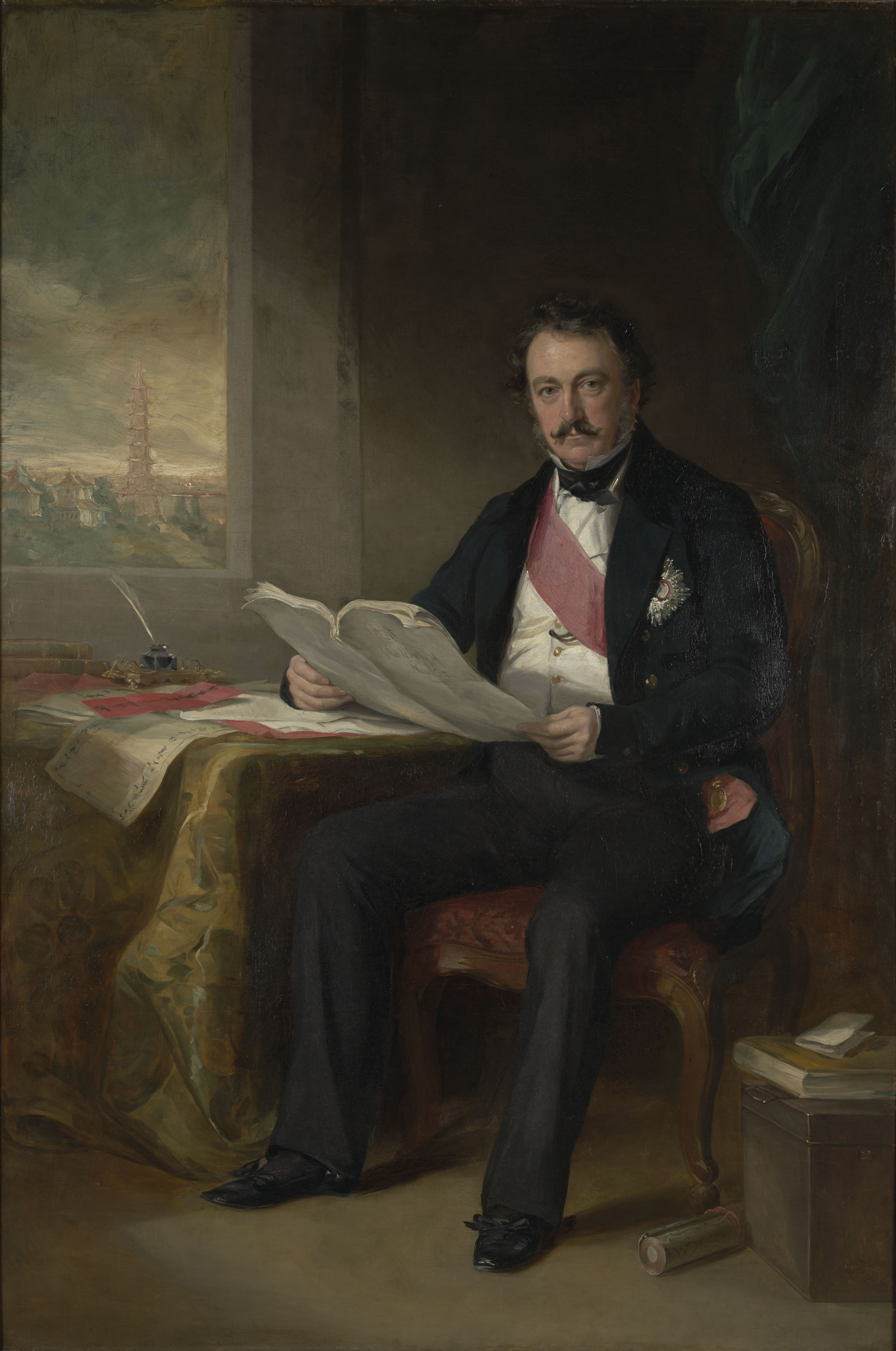
- Portrait, 1845

Governor of Hong Kong
- In office 26 June 1843 – 8 May 1844
- Monarch: Victoria
- Lieutenant: Sir George D'Aguilar
- Preceded by: Office established
- Succeeded by: Sir John Davis

Governor of the Cape Colony
- In office 27 January 1847 – 1 December 1847
- Preceded by: Sir Peregrine Maitland
- Succeeded by: Sir Harry Smith

Governor of Madras
- In office 7 April 1848 – 24 April 1854
- Preceded by: The Marquess of Tweeddale
- Succeeded by: The Lord Harris

Personal details
- Born: 3 October 1789 Ballymacarrett, Ireland
- Died: 18 March 1856 (aged 66) Valletta, Malta
- Resting place: Msida Bastion Historic Garden, Malta
- Spouse: Susanna Cooke (m. 1820)
- Relations: Eldred Pottinger (nephew)
- Children: 4
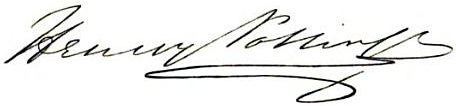
- Signature

Military service
- Allegiance: East India Company
- Branch/service: Bombay Army
- Years of service: 1804–1856
- Rank: Lieutenant-general
- Battles/wars: Third Anglo-Maratha War; First Opium War

Sir Henry Pottinger, 1st Baronet, Bt GCB PC (3 October 1789 – 18 March 1856) was a British military officer and colonial administrator. He served as the first governor of Hong Kong from 1843 to 1844 and became a Lieutenant-General with the Bombay Army in 1851.

== Early life ==
Henry Pottinger was born at his family estate of Mount Pottinger in Ballymacarrett in the north of County Down in Ulster, the northern province in Ireland, on 3 October 1789. At the time of his birth, all of Ireland was part of the British-ruled Kingdom of Ireland. An Ulster Protestant, he was descended from the Pottingers of Berkshire, an English family by origin with a branch that had settled in Ulster during the Plantation of Ulster in the seventeenth century. He was the fifth son of Eldred Curwen Pottinger and his wife Anne. They had three daughters and eight sons. His nephew was also named Eldred Pottinger. Henry attended the Belfast Academy until the age of 12. In 1803, he left for India to join the East India Company's maritime service, but in the following year joined the Company's military service as a cadet instead. He studied local languages in Bombay and became an assistant teacher. On 18 September 1806, he was made an ensign and promoted to lieutenant on 16 July 1809.

== India ==
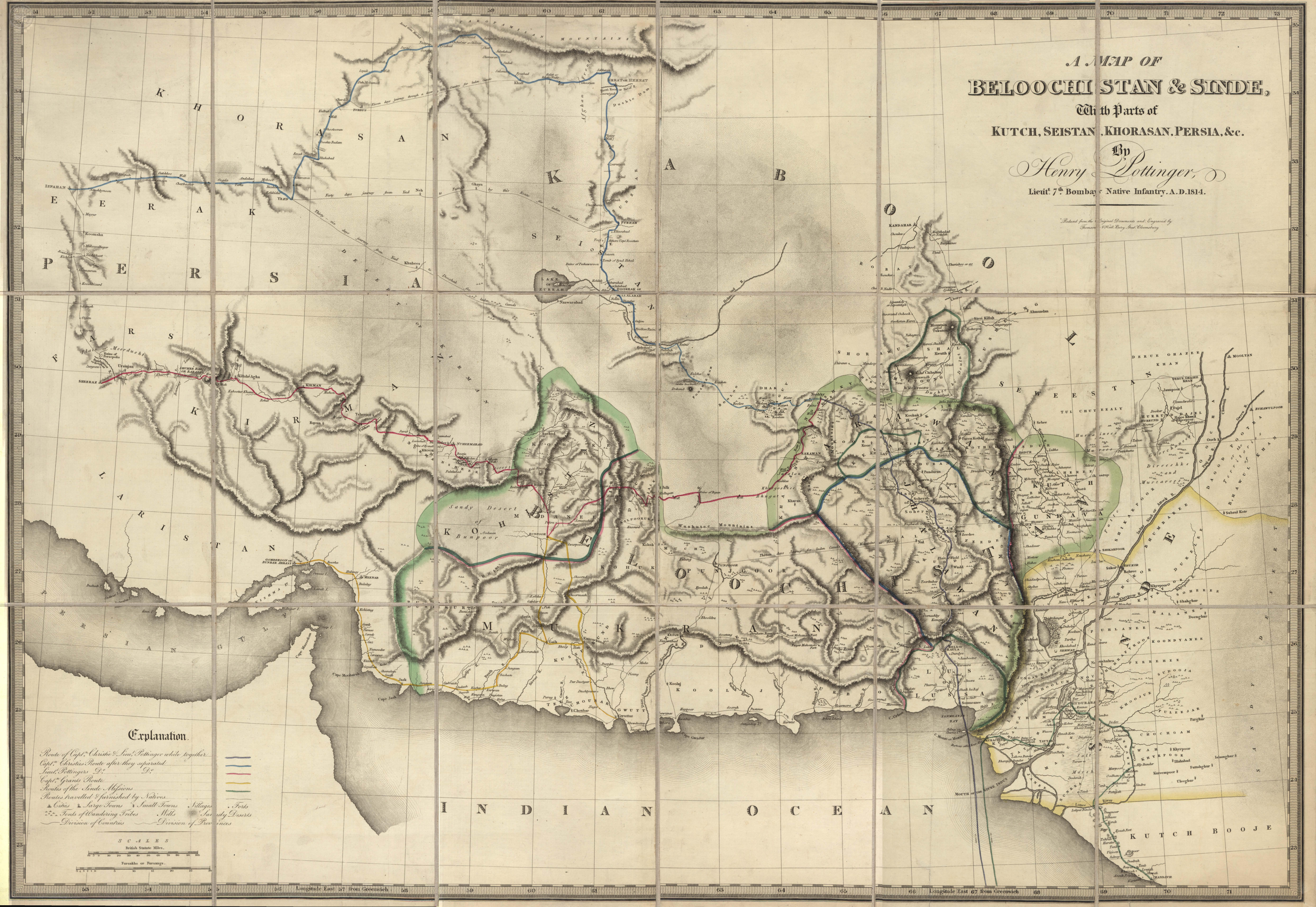
Pottinger's map of Balochistan and Sindh, showing his travel routes

Pottinger explored the lands between the Indus and Persia, traveling in disguise as a Muslim merchant and studying local languages, under the orders of Sir John Malcolm. In 1809, he served as a lieutenant in the Third Anglo-Maratha War. In 1810, he and Charles Christie undertook an expedition from Nushki (Balochistan) to Isfahan (Central Persia) disguised as Muslims. Christie went north to Herat and then west while Pottinger went west across two deserts to Kerman and Isfahan where they rejoined. The expedition was funded by the East India Company to map and research the regions of Balochistan and Persia because of concerns about India being invaded by French forces. It would be 100 years before another European took this route, and Pottinger rose to the rank of Colonel. Pottinger later became Resident Administrator of Sindh in 1820. He later held the same post in Hyderabad.

He was made a baronet when he returned to England in 1839.

== China ==
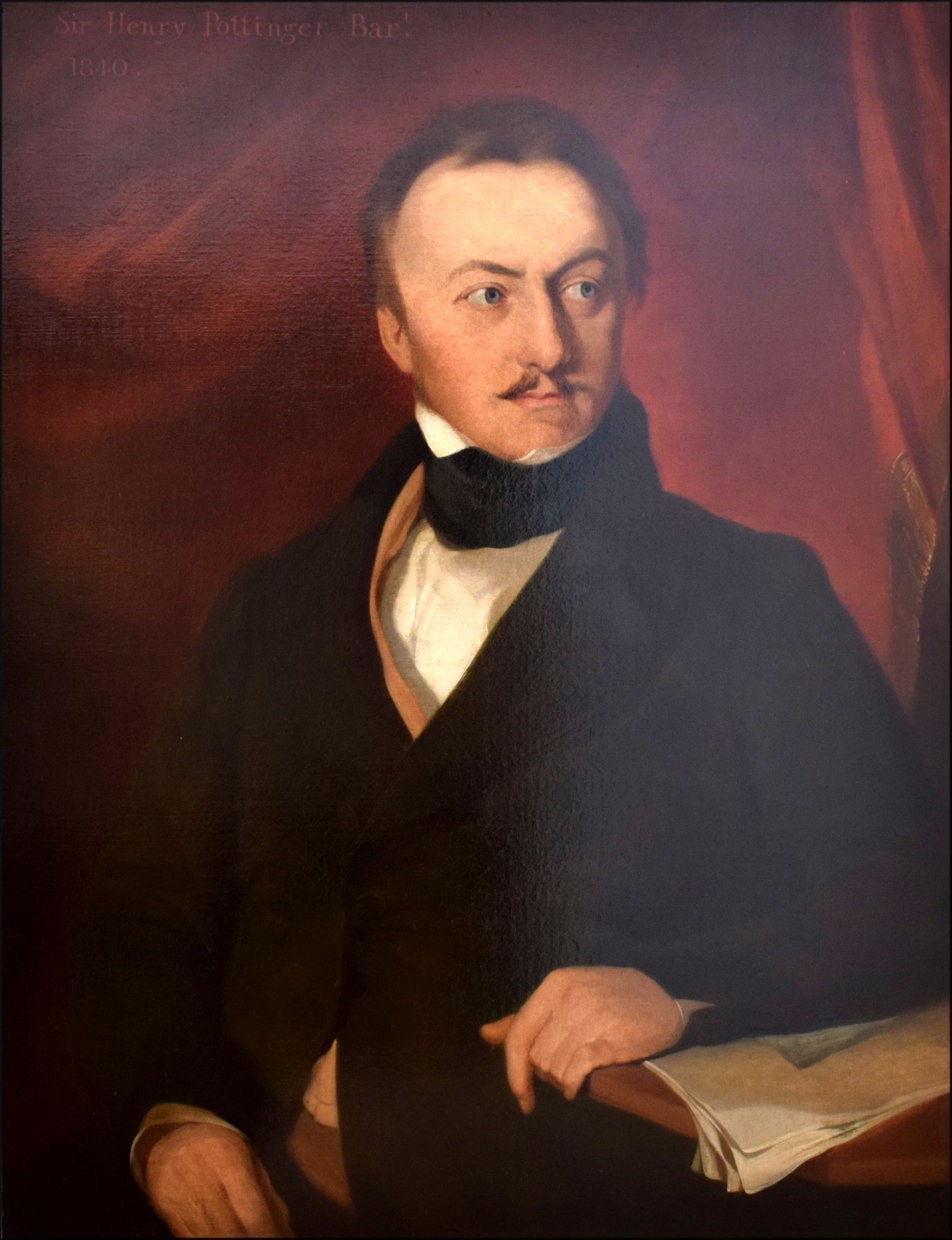
Portrait by Samuel Laurence, 1840

Pottinger accepted Foreign Secretary Lord Palmerston's offer of the post of envoy and plenipotentiary in China and superintendent of British trade, thus replacing Charles Elliot. In 1841, Palmerston instructed him to "examine with care the natural capacities of Hong Kong, and you will not agree to give up that Island unless you should find that you can exchange it for another in the neighbourhood of Canton, better adapted for the purposes in view; equally defensible; and affording sufficient shelter for Ships of War and Commerce".

Pottinger left London on 5 June, travelled by ship through the Mediterranean, over land across the Suez, and reached Bombay on 7 July, where he stayed for 10 days before arriving in China on 10 August. The whole trip took 67 days, a record at the time. On 4 November, Palmerston's successor Lord Aberdeen wrote to Pottinger that he had doubts over Hong Kong's acquisition since it would incur administrative expenses, and complicate relations with China and other nations.

After Pottinger joined the British expeditionary force in northern China, he negotiated the terms of the Treaty of Nanking (1842), which ended the First Opium War and ceded Hong Kong Island to the United Kingdom. Pottinger wrote in a letter to Aberdeen that at a feast celebrating the ratification with his Hong Kong counterpart, Keying, Keying insisted they ceremonially exchange miniature portraits of each member of each others' families. Upon receiving a miniature portrait of Pottinger's wife, Pottinger wrote that Keying "placed it on his head—which I am told is the highest token of respect and friendship—filled a glass of wine, held the picture in front of his face, muttered some words in a low voice, drank the wine, again placed the picture on his head and then sat down" to complete the ceremony of long-term amity between the two families and the two peoples.

== Governor of Hong Kong ==
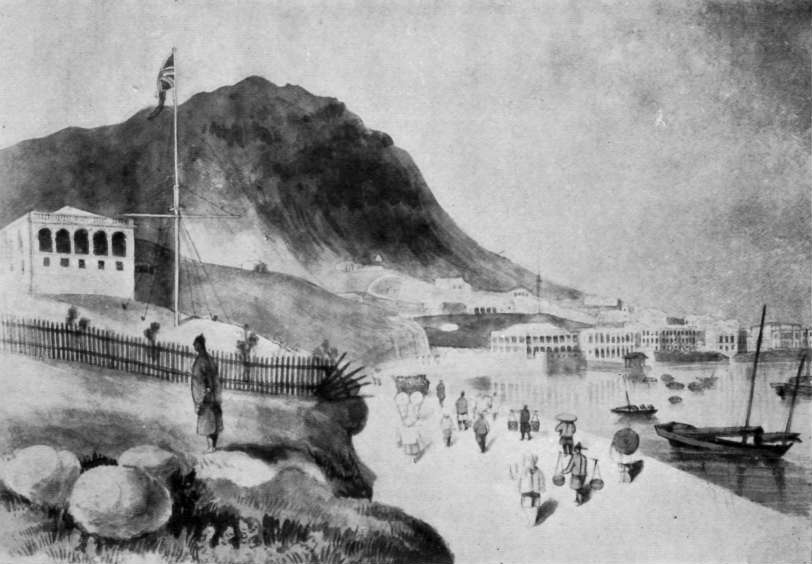
Pottinger's residence in Victoria, Hong Kong, 1845

Pottinger became the second Administrator of Hong Kong (1841–1843) and the first Governor of Hong Kong (1843–1844). When he forwarded the treaty to Aberdeen, Pottinger remarked, "the retention of Hong Kong is the only point in which I have intentionally exceeded my modified instructions, but every single hour I have passed in this superb country has convinced me of the necessity and desirability of our possessing such a settlement as an emporium for our trade and a place from which Her Majesty's subjects in China may be alike protected and controlled."

On 26 April 1843, Pottinger's residence, now the Former French Mission Building, was burgled. In May 1843, he recommended a police force of four officers and 50 men be recruited from Britain, but this was rejected on financial grounds.

On 26 June 1843, he was appointed to become the Chief Commander of the British troops stationed in Hong Kong.

During his short tenure, Pottinger established executive and legislative chambers, with one discussing political affairs and one designing legal codes. However, the chambers did not convene often, and this gave Pottinger wide-ranging powers to decide on policy.

Towards the end of his tenure, Pottinger lost the support of the local British merchants and was isolated. He left on 7 May 1844.

During his governorship, Hong Kong became the major port for trading opium in China.

== Later life ==
Pottinger returned to Britain in 1844. He became a member of the Privy Council on 23 May 1844, was presented with the freedom of many cities, and in June 1845 the House of Commons voted to grant him £1,500 a year for life. In 1847, he served as Governor of the Cape Colony. He returned to India as Governor of Madras from 1848 to 1854, and was promoted to lieutenant-general in 1851. He died in retirement in Valletta, Crown Colony of Malta, on 18 March 1856. He was buried in the Protestant cemetery, now known as the Msida Bastion Historic Garden, in Floriana. A marble plaque is still visible.

== Family ==
In 1820, Pottinger married Susanna Maria Cooke (1800–1886), daughter of Captain Richard Cooke. They had three sons and a daughter:

- Eldred Elphinstone Pottinger (born 1822); died in infancy.
- Frederick Pottinger, 2nd Baronet (1831–1865); police inspector.
- Henry Pottinger, 3rd Baronet (1834–1909); barrister; married in 1863; one daughter who married Henry Meysey-Thompson, 1st Baron Knaresborough.
- Henrietta Maria Pottinger (died 1905); married in 1850; three sons and a daughter.

== Namesakes ==
- Pottinger Street, Central, Hong Kong
- Pottinger Peak, Hong Kong
- Pottinger Gap, Hong Kong
- Pottinger Battery, Devil's Peak, Hong Kong
- Pottingers Entry, Belfast, Northern Ireland
- Pottinger House, Belfast Royal Academy, Northern Ireland
- Belfast Pottinger, UK Parliament constituency
- Pottinger County, New South Wales, Australia

== Honours ==
- (United Kingdom) 1839: Baronetcy (Bt)
- (United Kingdom) 2 December 1842: Knight Grand Cross of the Order of the Bath Civil Division (GCB)
- (United Kingdom) 23 May 1844: Member of Her Majesty's Most Honourable Privy Council (PC)

=== Freedom of the City ===
- (England) 13 February 1845: London
- (Scotland) Glasgow
- (Scotland) Edinburgh

== Works ==
- Travels in Beloochistan and Sinde. London: Longman. 1816.

Government offices
| Preceded by Sir Charles Elliot | Chief Superintendent of British Trade in China; 1841–1843 | Succeeded by Sir John Davis |
| Preceded by Sir Charles Elliot | Administrator of Hong Kong; 1841–1843 | Succeeded by Himself as Governor of Hong Kong |
| Preceded by Himself as Administrator of Hong Kong | Governor of Hong Kong; 1843–1844 | Succeeded by Sir John Davis |
| Preceded by Sir Peregrine Maitland | Governor of the Cape Colony; 1847 | Succeeded by Sir Harry Smith, Bt |
| Preceded by The Marquess of Tweeddale | Governor of Madras; 1848–1854 | Succeeded by The Lord Harris |
Baronetage of the United Kingdom
| New creation | Baronet (of Richmond); 1839–1856 | Succeeded by Frederick Pottinger |
