= Frederick Pottinger =

Australian police officer (1831–1865)

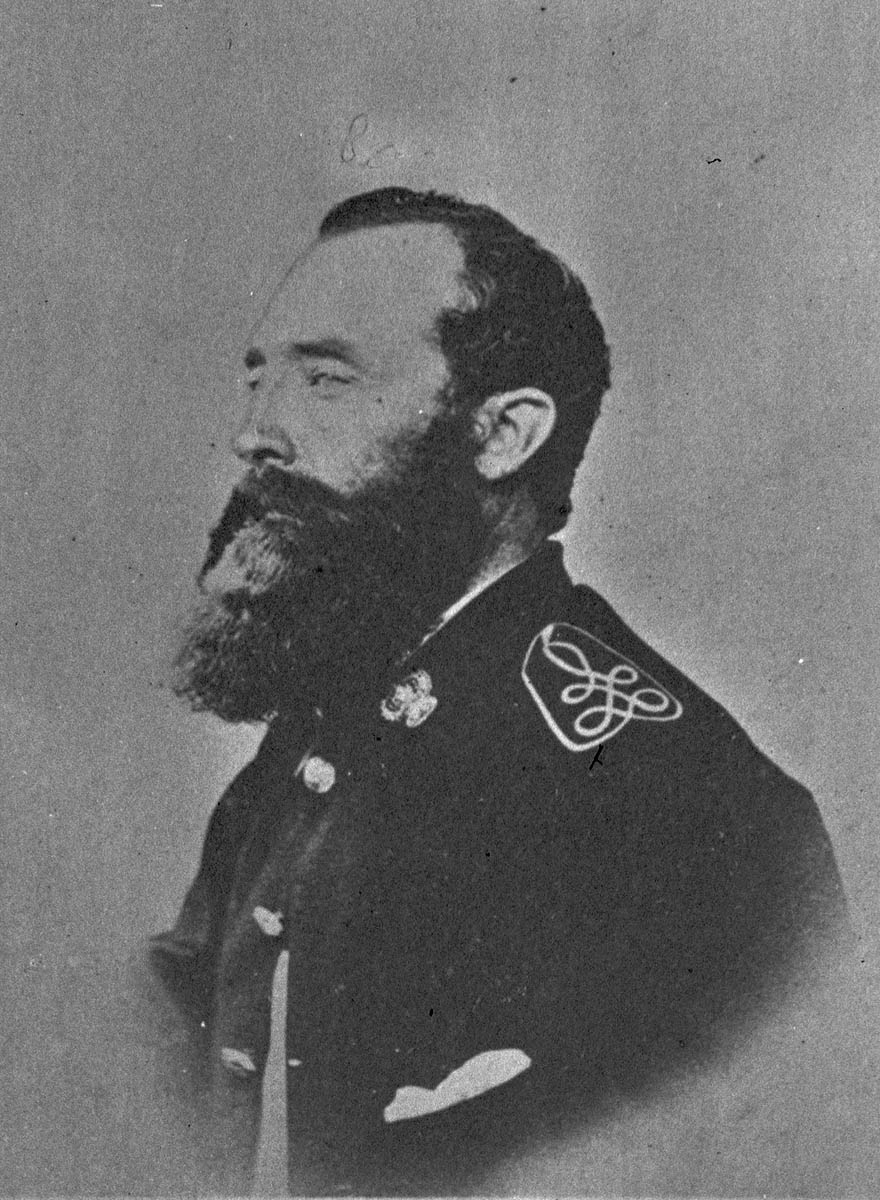
Official portrait of Frederick Pottinger

Sir Frederick William Pottinger, 2nd Baronet (27 April 1831 – 9 April 1865) was a police inspector in New South Wales, Australia, who gained fame for his fight against bushrangers.

== Early life ==
Pottinger was born in India, son of Lieutenant-General Sir Henry Pottinger of the British East India Company, and his wife Susanna Maria, née Cooke, of Dublin. He was educated privately before attending Eton from 1844 to 1847.

== Career ==
In 1850, Pottinger purchased a commission in the Grenadier Guards and served in England until 1854. Active in social life, he lost much of his adoring mother's wealth on the race-course. In 1856, he succeeded his father as second baronet and soon dissipated his inheritance. Forced by debt to leave England, he migrated to Sydney. After failing on the goldfields he joined the New South Wales police force as a mounted trooper. A superb horseman, he spent the next few years on the gold escort between Gundagai and Goulburn.

Probably because of conditions imposed by his family who still supported him with funds, Pottinger kept his title secret but in 1860 it was discovered by the inspector-general of police, John McLerie, and promotion came rapidly. In November he became clerk of petty sessions at Dubbo and, on 1 October 1861, assistant superintendent of the Southern Mounted Patrol. Although determined to succeed in his career, he was involved in a drunken brawl at Young on 20–21 December 1861. Sued, he received a public rebuke from the New South Wales premier, Charles Cowper, for his "highly discreditable" behaviour. Posted to the Lachlan area, he proved an indefatigable but unlucky hunter of bushrangers.

=== Inspector of police ===
Under the 1862 Police Regulation Act, Pottinger was appointed an inspector of police for the Western District of New South Wales. The Act was bitterly criticised and Pottinger seen as a symbol of its defects. In April 1862, he arrested Ben Hall at Forbes on a charge of highway robbery, but Hall was acquitted and joined Frank Gardiner's gang, which robbed the Lachlan escort of some £14,000 on 15 June 1862. Quickly in pursuit, Pottinger remained on the trail for a month, and arrested two of the bushrangers. They escaped several days later in a gun battle but Pottinger did recover the stolen gold. Criticised for his failure to send an adequate guard with the escort, and his return without prisoners, Pottinger was praised by others for his determination and endurance. On the night of 9 and 10 August, Pottinger and a party of police surrounded the house of Gardiner's mistress, Kate Brown, but the bushranger escaped when Pottinger's pistol misfired.

Up started then Sir Fred. and his men, with cock'd carbine in hand,
And call'd aloud on the Ranger proud, on pain of death, to "stand";
But the Ranger proud, he laughed aloud, and bounding rode away,
While Sir Frederick Pott. shut his eyes for a shot, and miss'd—in his usual way.

That incident earned Pottinger the nickname "Blind Freddie", which has since entered into the Australian vernacular.

The police arrested a young boy on suspicion of being an accomplice of Gardiner, and allowed him to remain in the lock-up without comforts. The boy's death from gaol fever in March 1863 further diminished Pottinger's reputation. On 27 September 1862, Pottinger appeared before a Bathurst court on a charge of assault.

He again became the subject of public notice in February 1863, when he attended the Sydney trials of the escort robbers and was jostled by larrikins in the street. He also threatened politician Joseph Harpur with his whip for charges made against him in the New South Wales Legislative Assembly. Meanwhile, the bushrangers in his district became more active. He later captured Patrick Daley but, on 17 August 1864, failed to arrest James Alpin McPherson.

In May 1863, the inspector-general had directed the police to act on their own initiative. Early in January 1865, hoping to lure Hall and his associate, fellow bushranger John Dunn, into the open, Pottinger rode in the Wowingragong races, in breach of police regulations. Despite his claim that his action "fully warranted the discretionary departure in point from the letter (tho' not the spirit)" of the regulation, he was dismissed from the police force on 16 February 1865. Protest meetings against his dismissal were held on the diggings and in the towns, with petitions for his reappointment.

== Death ==
On 5 March 1865, at Wascoe's Inn in the Blue Mountains, while boarding a moving coach on his way to Sydney to seek redress, Pottinger accidentally shot himself in the upper abdomen. He recovered sufficiently to be moved to the Victoria Club in Sydney, but he died intestate on 9 April 1865, and was buried at St Jude's Anglican Church, Randwick. He was succeeded by his brother, Henry, as 3rd Baronet.

== See also ==
- Pottinger Baronets

== Notes ==
Baronetage of the United Kingdom
Preceded by Henry Pottinger	Baronet (of Richmond); 1856–1865	Succeeded by Henry Pottinger
