= Markus Pöttinger =

German ice hockey player

- Born: January 5, 1978 (age 48) Munich, West Germany
- Height: 6 ft 0 in (183 cm)
- Weight: 185 lb (84 kg; 13 st 3 lb)
- Position: Defence
- Shot: Left
- Played for: Star Bulls Rosenheim; Berlin Capitals; DEG Metro Stars; Iserlohn Roosters
- Playing career: 1995–2006

Markus Pöttinger (born January 5, 1978) is a German former ice hockey player who last played for Iserlohn Roosters. Pöttinger has played for the national team 8 times and achieved 2nd place in the European Junior championship in 1995. As of 2007 he is working on an ice hockey related doctorate and is a member of the disciplinarian committee of the Deutsche Eishockey Liga.

== Career statistics ==
			Regular season					Playoffs
Season	Team	League	GP	G	A	Pts	PIM	GP	G	A	Pts	PIM
1994–95	Starbulls Rosenheim U20	Junioren-BL	32	3	8	11	18	—	—	—	—	—
1995–96	Starbulls Rosenheim U20	Junioren-BL	18	3	5	8	35	—	—	—	—	—
1995–96	Starbulls Rosenheim	DEL	26	0	0	0	6	4	0	0	0	0
1996–97	Starbulls Rosenheim	DEL	38	1	0	1	10	2	0	0	0	0
1997–98	Ottawa 67's	OHL	54	0	17	17	18	14	0	3	3	4
1998–99	EC Bad Tölz	Germany2	43	3	5	8	28	14	1	1	2	2
1999–00	EC Bad Tölz	Germany2	12	0	0	0	6	1	0	0	0	0
1999–00	Berlin Capitals	DEL	50	0	1	1	12	7	0	0	0	12
2000–01	Berlin Capitals	DEL	60	2	3	5	10	5	0	0	0	2
2001–02	Berlin Capitals	DEL	59	0	6	6	14	—	—	—	—	—
2002–03	DEG Metro Stars	DEL	46	0	5	5	24	5	0	0	0	0
2003–04	DEG Metro Stars	DEL	48	0	2	2	34	3	0	0	0	0
2004–05	DEG Metro Stars	DEL	49	1	5	6	16	—	—	—	—	—
2005–06	Iserlohn Roosters	DEL	50	3	7	10	76	—	—	—	—	—
DEL totals			426	7	29	36	202	26	0	0	0	14
