= Eldred Pottinger =

British Diplomat

Eldred Pottinger CB
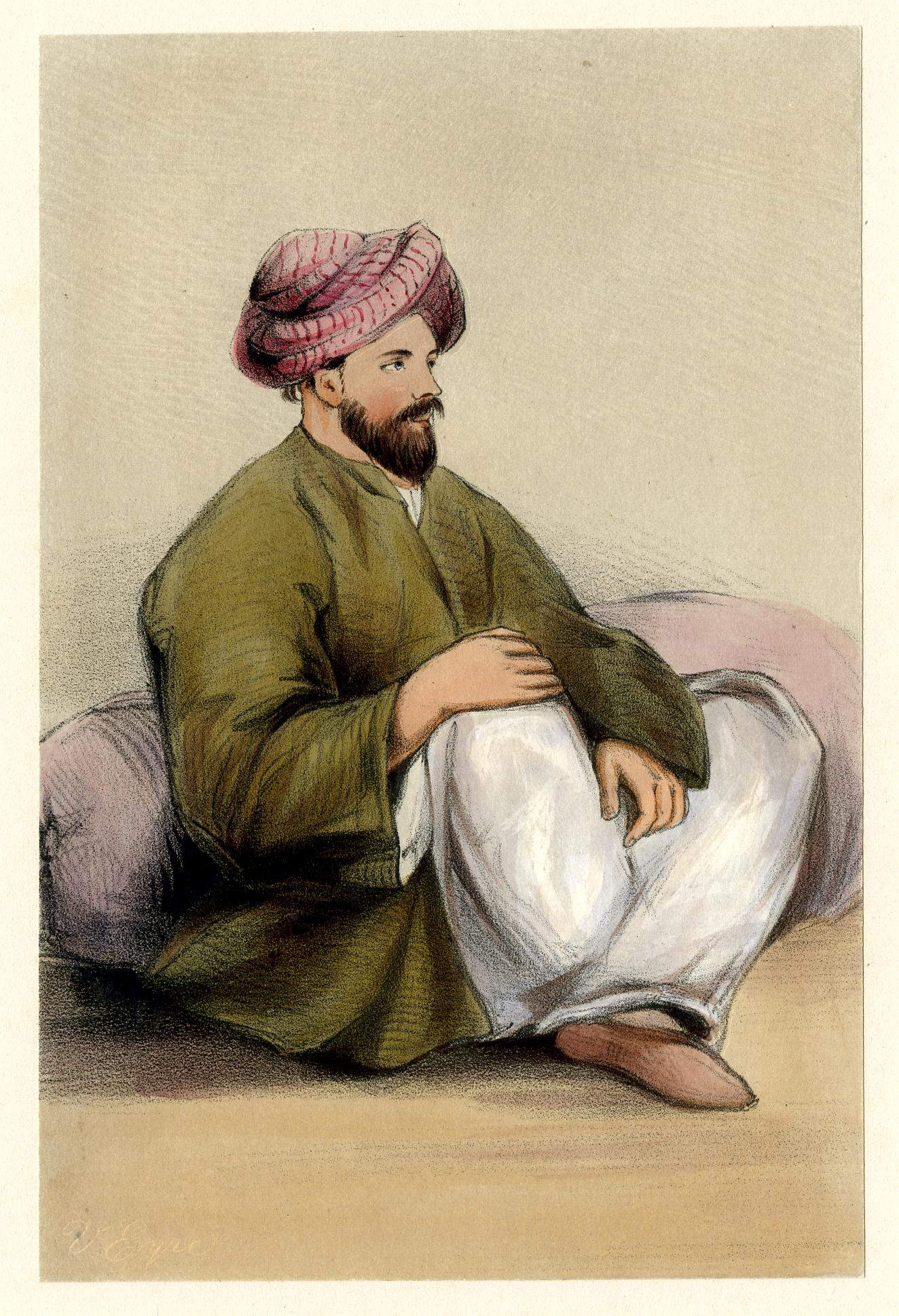
- Sketch by Vincent Eyre
- Born: 12 August 1811; Ireland, United Kingdom of Great Britain and Ireland
- Died: 15 November 1843 (aged 32); Hong Kong, British Empire
- Relatives: Henry Pottinger (uncle)

Eldred Pottinger (12 August 1811 – 15 November 1843) was a Bombay Army officer and diplomat. In 1837 he happened to be in Herat in Afghanistan to gather intelligence on the area when the Persian army, supported by Russians, laid siege to the city. He helped the Afghan commander repulse the Persians, and was subsequently dubbed the "Hero of Herat" by British historians.

== Life ==
Pottinger was born on 12 August 1811 in Ireland. He was the eldest son of Thomas Pottinger of Mount Pottinger, County Down (now in Northern Ireland), and Charlotte Moore. He was educated at Addiscombe Military Seminary (1826–1827) and entered the Bombay Artillery in 1827. After some years of regimental duty he was appointed to the political department under his uncle, Colonel (afterwards knighted and promoted to Lieutenant General) Henry Pottinger.

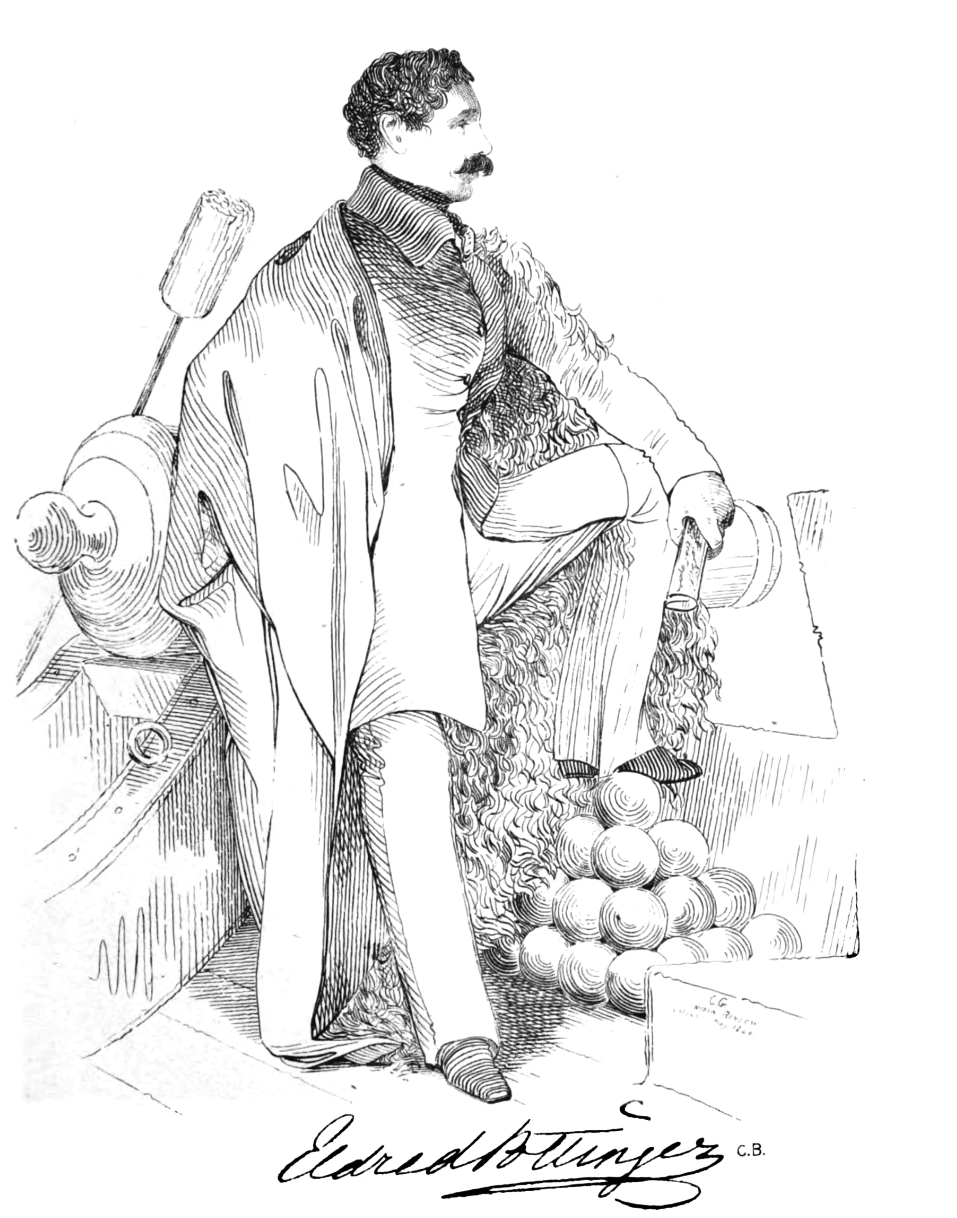
Portrait by Colesworthey Grant

In 1837 he made a journey through Afghanistan in disguise. Arriving at Herat, he found it threatened by a Persian army (with whom were some Russian officers) and immediately made himself known to the Afghan commander, offering his services. The attack which soon followed was conducted with vigour, but the defence, inspired by Pottinger, was ultimately successful, and after a year the siege was lifted.

For this service Pottinger was thanked by the governor-general, the Earl of Auckland, made brevet-major, and also received the C.B. He was also appointed Political Officer at Herat. In 1841 he was political officer in Kohistan when the revolt against Shah Shuja broke out there. Taking refuge with the Gurkha garrison of Charikar, Major Pottinger withstood a siege of fourteen days, and then made an adventurous retreat to Kabul. Less than a fortnight after his arrival Sir William Macnaghten was murdered, and Pottinger succeeded to his position as envoy to the Afghan court. The apathy of the military leaders made resistance hopeless, and it only remained to negotiate for the withdrawal of the British army. Pottinger himself was one of the hostages handed over to Akbar Khan, and thus escaped the near-total massacre of the retreating British and Sepoy troops in the evacuation from Kabul to Jelalabad in January 1842. Released, after some months in captivity, by Sir George Pollock's army, he returned to India.

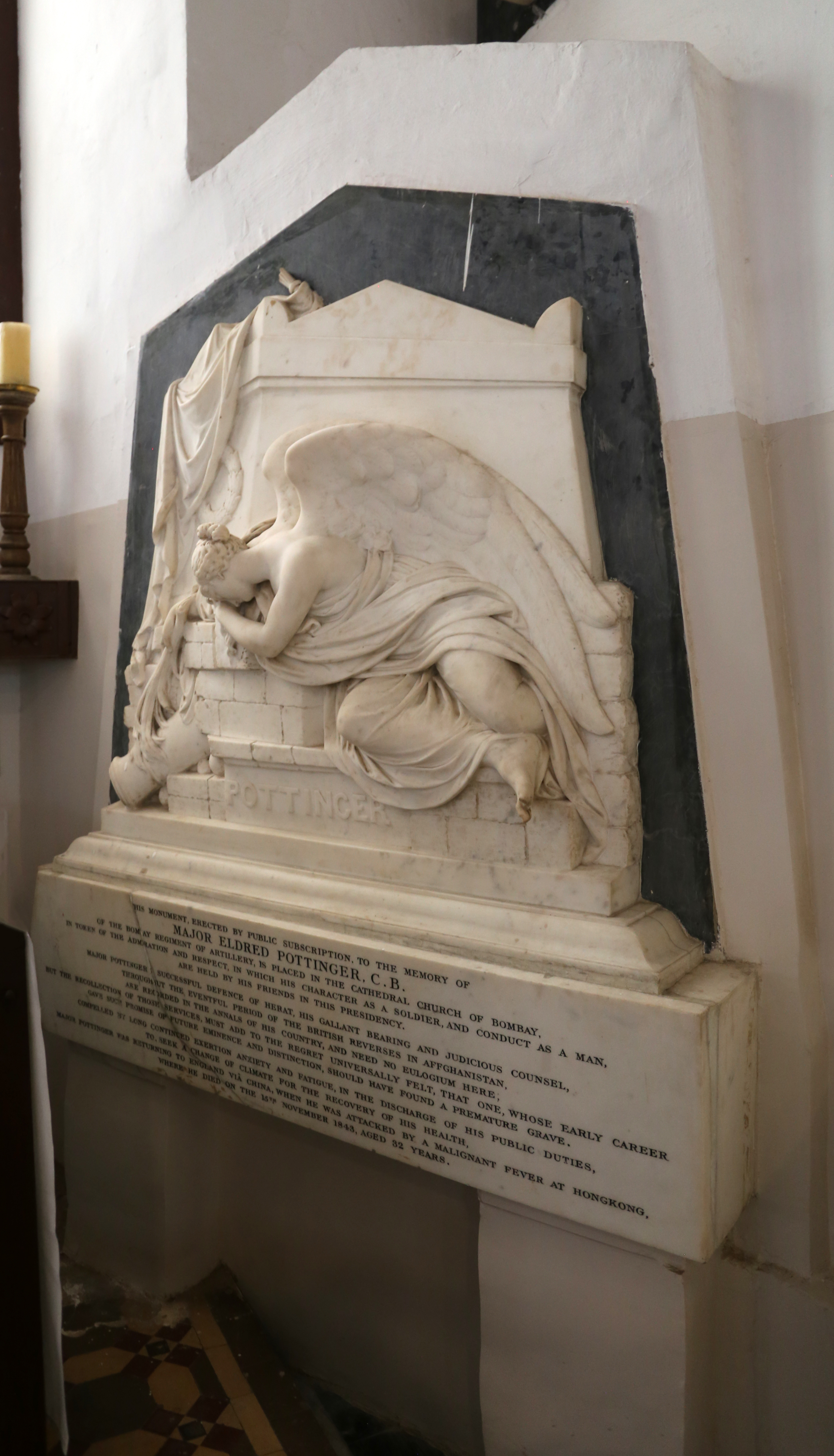
The cenotaph in Mumbai

Pottinger died on 15 November 1843 in Hong Kong while visiting his uncle Henry Pottinger, the first Governor of Hong Kong. He is commemorated by a cenotaph in St. Thomas Cathedral, Mumbai.

== Legacy ==
Pottinger's role in the siege of Herat was repeatedly noted by 19th-century British historians, who described him as a genius of defensive sieges and dubbed him the "Hero of Herat". These historians described Pottinger as the man who defended the "pearl of the British Empire" from the Russo-Persian threat. However, although Pottinger defended the strategic interests of British India, Herat was never part of the British Empire.

== See also ==
- Siege of Herat (1837–1838)
