= Hymns by Dun Karm Psaila =

This is a list of hyms authored by Dun Karm Psaila.

== Eucharistic Hymn (T’Adoriam Ostia Divina) ==
Among the many religious hymns written by Dun Karm, one that became popular even abroad was "T'adoriam ostia divina" or "Nadurawk ja Ħobż tas-Sema". When the International Eucharistic Congress was held in Malta in 1913, Maestro Joseph Caruana asked Dun Karm to write a hymn for the occasion. Many of the bishops present at the Congress loved the hymn, took it with them to their respective dioceses and had it translated. It has since become popular in many languages, for example, in English with the title "Host Divine, we bow in Worship" and in Spanish "Te adoramos, Hostia Divina". Dun Karm himself provided a Maltese version in 1924.

T'adoriam ostia divina	Nadurawk ja Ħobż tas-Sema	Host Divine, we bow in Worship
Italian Original (Dun Karm, 1913)	Maltese Translation (Dun Karm, 1924)	English Translation (attrib. H. St Lavin, SJ)
T'adoriam, Ostia divina, t'adoriam, Ostia d'amor. Tu dell'angelo il sospiro, tu dell'uomo sei l'onor. T'adoriam, Ostia divina, t'adoriam, Ostia d'amor.	Nadurawk ja Ħobż tas-Sema Frott l-imħabba l-iżjed bnin. Għalik l-anġli dlonk titniehed, Inti l-hena tal-bnedmin. Nadurawk ja Ħobż tas-Sema Frott l-imħabba l-iżjed bnin.	Host Divine, we bow in worship, Host Divine, we sing thy praise, Thou desire of all the angels Glory of our humble ways. Host Divine, we bow in worship, Host Divine, we sing thy praise.
Tu dei forti la dolcezza, tu dei deboli il vigor, tu salute dei viventi, tu speranza di chi muor. T'adoriam, Ostia divina, t'adoriam, Ostia d'amor.	Nadurawk, ja Ħobż tas-sema, Frott l-imħabba l-iżjed bnin. Int is-saħħa tal-qawwija, Int il-faraġ tad-dgħajfin. Nadurawk ja Ħobż tas-Sema Frott l-imħabba l-iżjed bnin.	Host Divine, we bow in worship, Host Divine, we sing thy praise, To the strong Thou givest meekness And the weak to strength dost raise. Host Divine, we bow in worship, Host Divine, we sing thy praise.
Tu dei forti la dolcezza, tu dei deboli il vigor, tu salute dei viventi, tu speranza di chi muor. T'adoriam, Ostia divina, t'adoriam, Ostia d'amor.	Nadurawk, ja Ħobż tas-sema, Frott l-imħabba l-iżjed bnin. Inti l-qawma ta’ min raqad, Inti l-għaxja tal-ħajjin. Nadurawk ja Ħobż tas-Sema Frott l-imħabba l-iżjed bnin.	Host Divine, we bow in worship, Host Divine, we sing thy praise, Thou salvation of the living Hope of those whom death dismays. Host Divine, we bow in worship, Host Divine, we sing thy praise.
Ti conosca il mondo e t'ami, tu la gioia d'ogni cuor; ave, o Dio nascosto e grande, tu dei secoli il Signor. T'adoriam, Ostia divina, t'adoriam, Ostia d'amor.	Nadurawk, ja Ħobż tas-sema, Frott l-imħabba l-iżjed bnin; Jalla d-dinja tagħraf tħobbok, Fik il-qlub huma henjin. Nadurawk, ja Ħobż tas-sema, Frott l-imħabba l-iżjed bnin.	Host Divine, we bow in worship, Host Divine, we sing thy praise, May thy children know and love Thee, For the world thy love displays. Host Divine, we bow in worship, Host Divine, we sing thy praise.
Ti conosca il mondo e t'ami, tu la gioia d'ogni cuor; ave, o Dio nascosto e grande, tu dei secoli il Signor. T'adoriam, Ostia divina, t'adoriam, Ostia d'amor.	Nadurawk, ja Ħobż tas-sema, Frott l-imħabba l-iżjed bnin, Insellmulek, Alla moħbi, Inti biss taħkem is-snin. Nadurawk, ja Ħobż tas-sema, Frott l-imħabba l-iżjed bnin.	Host Divine, we bow in worship, Host Divine, we sing thy praise, Hail, o God of hidden splendour Lord of time through endless days. Host Divine, we bow in worship, Host Divine, we sing thy praise.

== Maltese National Anthem (L-Innu Malti) ==
In 1922, Professor Mro. Robert Samut composed a short melody, which was obtained a year later by Dr A.V. Laferla, Director of Primary Schools in Malta, who wanted to have an anthem composed which could be sung by students in Malta's schools as an expression of their Maltese identity. Laferla asked Dun Karm to write lyrics to fit the melody, which then became the Maltese National Anthem.

L-Innu Malti	The Maltese National Anthem	
Maltese original	English singable translation (René M. Micallef)	Simplified English translation (May Butcher)
Lil din l-art ħelwa, l-Omm li tatna isimha, (1) Ħares, Mulej, kif dejjem Int ħarist: (2) Ftakar li lilha bil-oħla dawl libbist. (3)	Guard, Lord, forever, as you've done erst and ceasing never, This land whose name we received, our motherly-named Mother. Her you have draped with a light whose grace exceeds all other.	Guard her, O Lord, as ever Thou hast guarded! This Motherland so dear whose name we bear! Keep her in mind, whom Thou hast made so fair!
Agħti, kbir Alla, id-dehen lil min jaħkimha, (4) Rodd il-ħniena lis-sid, saħħa 'l-ħaddiem: (5) Seddaq il-għaqda fil-Maltin u s-sliem. (6)	On those who govern, sovereign God, bestow understanding, Grant wellness to those who work, largesse to those employing, Make firm, make just all our bonds, the peace we are enjoying.	May he who rules, for wisdom be regarded! In master mercy, strength in man increase! Confirm us all, in unity and peace!

== Morning and Evening Hymns ==
These hymns are frequently used in many parishes during morning and evening masses, and are used for solemnities in the Maltese translation of the Liturgy of the Hours.

L-Innu ta' Filgħodu	A Hymn for the Morning
Maltese Original	English Translation (René M. Micallef, 2017)
Reġa’ sebaħ, ja Mulejja, Għati tiegħek dan il-jum: Lejk nittajjar bil-ħsieb tiegħi Kull filgħodu malli nqum. Fix-xemx jiddi l-ġmiel ta’ wiċċek, Inti ssebbaħ il-ħolqien; Isellmulek l-art u s-sema Kull filgħodu bl-ogħla lsien. [R.] Ja Mulejja niżżik ħajr, Għaliex int tal-ħajja s-Sid: Fik is-setgħa, fik il-ħniena, Int fawwara ta’ kull ġid.	Dawn again, my Lord, has broken, May your day be but a gift, Every morn I soar to meet you When my thoughts to you I lift. In the sun your face is beaming All creation you array, Heav'n and earth come out to greet you With their sweetest voice, each day. [R.] You're the Master of all life, So I'm grateful to you, Lord. Full of power, full of mercy, You are goodness, gushing forth.
F’dan il-lejl li għadda fuqi Int ħaristni, Alla ħanin; Int wennistni minn kull biżgħa, Warrabt minni l-ħolm ħażin. Bħal missier f’telfa ta’ mħabba It-taħbit ta’ qalbi smajt; Xħitt is-saħħa ġewwa sidri Ma’ kull nifs li jiena tajt. //R.	You've watched over me, O God, all Through the night which passed my way, You have shielded me from horrors, You have pushed bad dreams away. As a father crazed with love, you Heard the beatings of my heart: You've thrust power in my bosom Every time a breath would start. //R.
F’dan il-jum tħallix, Mulejja, Li jitnissel f’qalbi d-dnub; Inti taf li l-għadu tagħna Għandu x-xbiek dejjem minsub. Tini l-Omm tal-Iben tiegħek Biex tħarisni mit-tiġrib, U tgħallimni b’imħabbitha Kif inħaddan is-salib. //R.	Let no evil sprout within me, I beseech you, Lord, this day, You know well how ill ensnares us Setting traps along the way. Give me your Son's mother, Mary, So to keep me from the test, By her love she'll also teach me To embrace the cross, as crest. //R.

L-Innu ta'Filgħaxija	A Hymn for the Evening	
Maltese Original	English Translation (metric) (René M. Micallef, 2017)	English Translation (singable) (René M. Micallef, 2017)
Riesaq il-lejl, Mulejja, Bil-wegħda tal-mistrieħ; Ġa beda s-sema jħammar Fi nżul ix-xemx sabiħ: Dalwaqt jixirfu l-kwiekeb, Fil-għoli tas-smewwiet; Dalwaqt il-ħajja torqod, Kull ħoss imut fis-skiet. [R.] Inti, li dejjem tgħammar, Fis-sebħ ta’ jum bla tmiem, Fid-dlam tal-lejl ħarisna, Xerred ġo qlubna s-sliem.	Night is approaching, O Lord, Bearing a promise of rest. Crimson is decking the sky While sets the sun in the west. Soon will the stars show their face Filling the heavens up high, Soon will the living retire, Silence: when all noises die. [R.] Thou, who the glorious dawn, Dwellest, of nev'rending Day: Shelter us when falls the night, Peace in our hearts, sweetly lay.	See how the night approaches, Boding a time of rest; Heaven is decked in crimson Sun ’s setting in the west. Stars will soon make their entrance Filling, up high, the skies, Soon will the living slumber, All noise is hushed, and dies. [R.] You, Lord, indwell the daybreak, An endless morn you fill, Yet we know night. So keep us, Make our hearts whole and still.
Temmejna l-jum, Mulejja, Imqassam ħidma u serħ, Xi waqt miksur bin-niket; Mogħni xi waqt bil-ferħ. Kollox mit-tieba tiegħek, Għax int Missier ħanin, Li trid il-ħlejjaq kollha Bi mħabbtek biss henjin. //R.	Our day is done, gentle Lord, Split between labour and rest, Fractured by sorrow, sometimes, Sometimes with merriment blest. All from thy bounty comes forth, Father of mercy, above, Who all thy creatures desirest Joyous with naught but thy love. //R.	See how the day is ended, Layers of work and rest, Shattered, at times, by sorrow, Sometimes with pleasure blest. Father so rich in mercy, All things come from your trove, You wish to see creation Enthralled with but your love. //R.
Ieqaf, Mulej, mal-fqajjar, ’Tih l-għata, ’tih l-għajxien, Sabbar lil min hu mibki, Serraħ lil min għajjien. Iġbed bil-ħlewwa l-midneb, Li regħxek mingħajr jedd, Tħalli lil ħadd fil-biża’, Tal-ħaqq imur jimtedd. //R.	Stand by our poor brethren, Lord, Clothe them, their sustenance give, Comfort the crying, the tir'd Well may they rest and may live. Sweetly draw sinners to thee, Though they have reddened thy face Let no one lie down in fear, Biding chastisement, but grace. //R.	Sustain and clothe the needy, Stand by them, Lord, today, Comfort them, who are weeping, The tir’d, with rest, repay. Beckon the sinner, gently, Who wronged you and his kin, Let none lie down in anguish A fear of doom within. //R.

== A Marian Hymn (Fil-Ħlewwa ta' Mejju) ==
Innu lill-Madonna (Fil-Ħlewwa ta' Mejju)	A Marian Hymn
Maltese Original	English Translation (René M. Micallef, 2017)
Fil-ħlewwa ta’ Mejju, Omm tagħna Marija O kemm idoqq ħlejju dak ismek sabiħ Kemm toħroġ qawwija dil-kelma minn qalbna Bit-tama li talbna jagħtik l-akbar ġieħ. [R.] Int l-għaxqa tas-sema, ix-xemx tal-ħolqien Int l-omm ta’ min ħalqek, bik mimli kull żmien.	In May, mother Mary, a month so delightful, Your name gently rises, its beauty rings out, The word ushers forth from our hearts, beating strongly: We hope so to laud you, a pray'r on our mouth. Delight of the heavens, creation's bright star, You fill every age, for God's mother you are.
Jekk tiftaħ fil-ġonna il-warda Maltija, Tfakkarna o Madonna fil-lewn ta’ ħaddejk! Jekk tidħak id-dija tal-kwiekeb irżina, Tfakkarna o ħanina fid-dawl ta’ għajnejk! //R.	The rose, when it blossoms, perfuming our gardens, Evokes for us, Lady, the hew of your cheeks! Your eyes come to mind when the stars' glow and flicker, So pure yet so mirthful, your kind radiance leaks! //R.
Minn dejjem bint Alla, nadifa mill-ħtija Infrixt bħal qawsalla fuq ras il-bnedmin. Int ftaħt o Marija l-għejun ta’ kull ħniena Fuq l-aħwa ħosbiena, fuq l-aħwa ħatjin. //R.	Preserved at the outset, God's daughter and sinless, Unfurled as a rainbow on all humankind, You've opened, o Mary, the wellsprings of mercy For our troubled brethren, those guilty and blind. //R.
Għalhekk ja sultana tal-ħlewwa Marija Int biss tama tagħna, int qawwa tar-ruħ. Bil-grazzja mimlija, kull waqt insellmulek, Bil-ħrara ngħajtulek fis-siegħa tad-dmugħ. //R.	That's why, dearest Mary, our Queen sweet and tender, You sate us with hope and you shore up our soul. We greet you, and greet you, O grace-filled; when shattered We cry our hearts out to you: come and console. //R.

== Hymn to the Sacred Heart (Tina l-Ħlewwa) ==
Innu lill-Qalb ta' Ġesù (Tina l-Ħlewwa)	Hymn to the Sacred Heart
Maltese Original	English Translation (René M. Micallef, 2017)
Tina l-ħlewwa tal-ilsna tas-sema Biex il-ġieħ li jixraqlek nagħtuk, Qalb ħanina li tagħder li taħfer, Kif ħabbejtna nixtiequ nħobbuk. [R.] Qalb imqaddsa ta' Ġesù Li berikt lit-tfal ċkejknin Kebbes fina n-nar ta' mħabbtek Żommna miegħek imħaddnin.	Make us apt, like the sweet tongues of heaven, To deliver the praise you deserve, Heart of mercy, condoling, forgiving, As we're loved, may we love, may we serve. [R.] Sacred heart of Jesus, who blessed the children, bless us too. With your love set us ablaze, and Keep us all in your embrace.
Biex tifdina mill-jasar ewlieni, ta' Missierek l-għamara ħallejt Int li tgħaxxaq is-sema bi ġmielek, ta' suritna fil-faqar inħbejt. //R.	To redeem us from primordial slav'ry You took off from your Father's abode, You whose beauty enraptures the heavens, in the want of our form, hid your lode. //R.
L-aħħar qatra ta' demmek tajthielna, Meta b'daqqa ta' lanza nifduk, Int għallimtna tan-niket il-hena, Int għallimtna fil-hemm inberkuk. //R.	When the lance pierced your heart, and you gave us The last drop of your blood as a boon, There you fed us with sorrows' contentment, There you taught us to bless you in doom. //R.
