= Christianity in Malta =

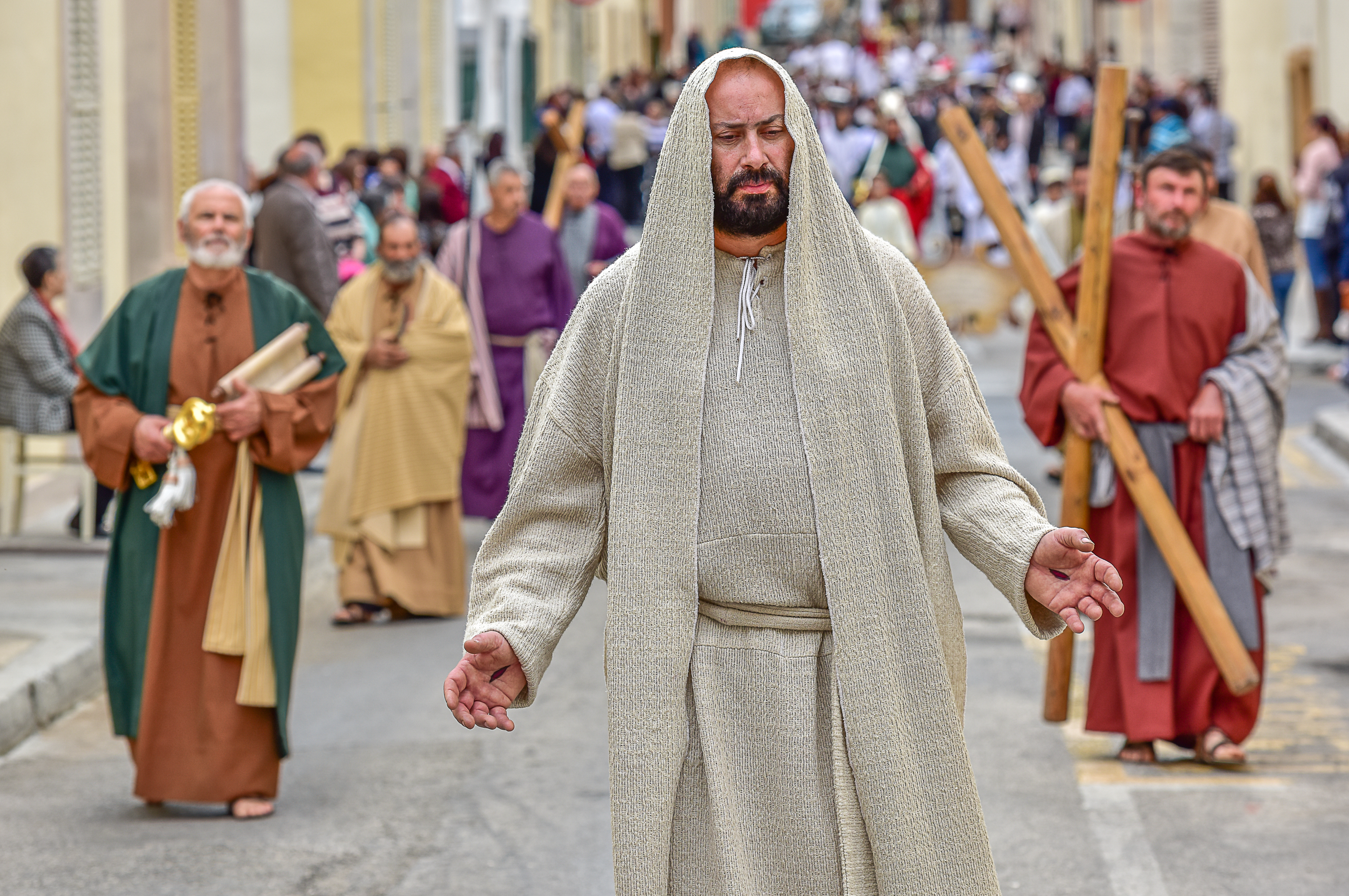
Holy Friday procession in Malta

In the small Mediterranean island nation of Malta, the predominant religion is Roman Catholicism.

A 2021 survey conducted by the University of Malta showed that 88% of respondents identified as Catholic, while 11% said they had no religious belief.

== History of Christianity in Malta ==
=== Saint Paul ===
The apostle Paul's time in Malta is described in the Acts of the Apostles (Acts 27:39–42; Acts 28:1–11). Tradition holds that the church was founded by its patrons Saint Paul the Apostle and Saint Publius, who was its first bishop. The Islands of St. Paul (or St. Paul's Islets), in effect only one island during low tide, are traditionally believed to be the site where Saint Paul was shipwrecked in AD 60, on his way to trial and eventual martyrdom in Rome.

=== Establishment of the Archdiocese of Malta ===
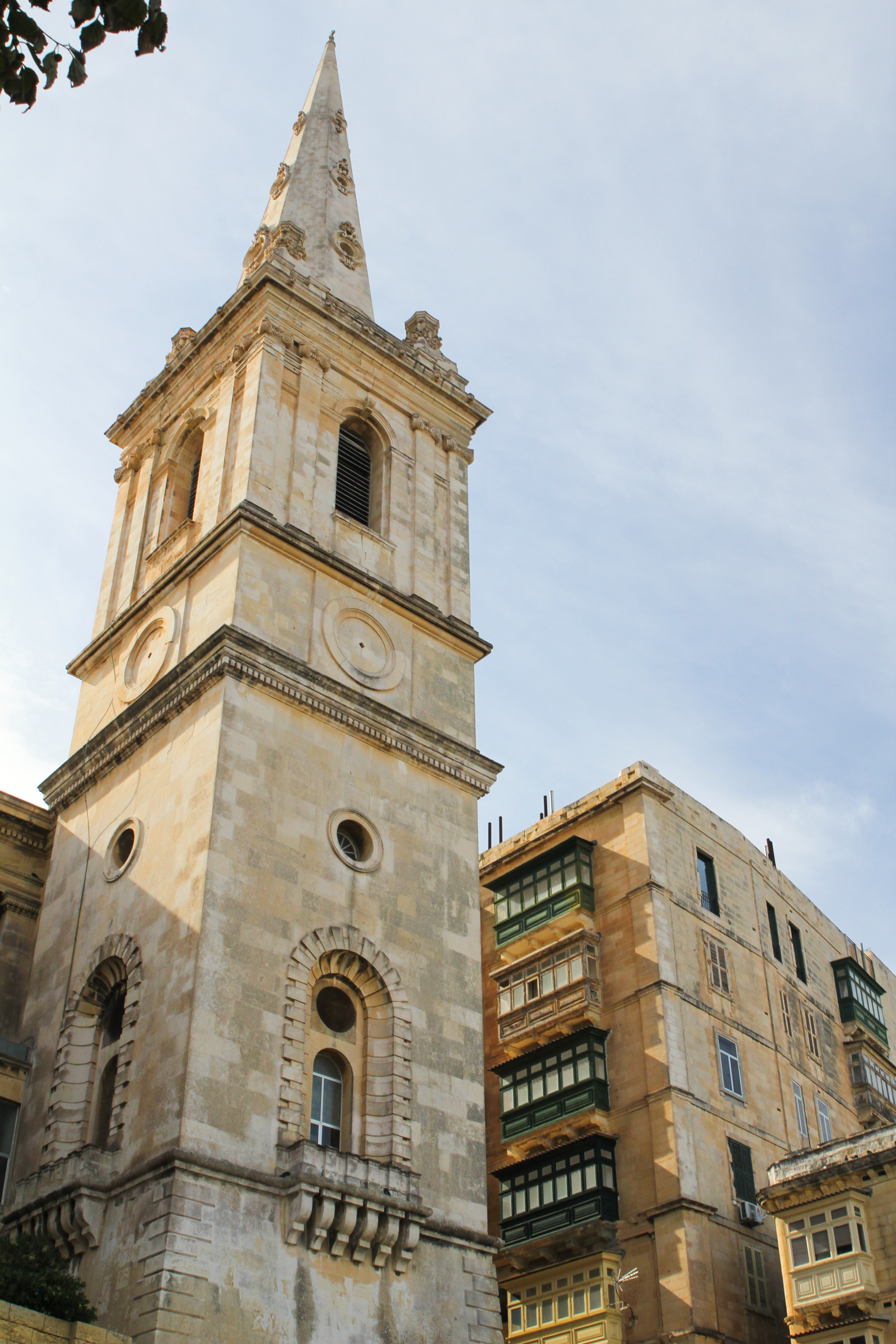
St Paul's Anglican Cathedral

According to tradition, Publius, the Roman Governor of Malta at the time of Saint Paul's shipwreck, became the first Bishop of Malta following his conversion to Christianity. After ruling the Maltese Church for 31 years, Publius was transferred to the See of Athens in 90 AD, where he was martyred in 125 AD. There is scant information about the continuity of Christianity in Malta in subsequent years, although tradition has it that there was a continuous line of bishops from the days of St. Paul to the time of Emperor Constantine. The Acts of the Council of Chalcedon record that in 451 AD, a certain Acacius was Bishop of Malta (Melitenus Episcopus). It is also known that in 501 AD, a certain Constantinus, Episcopus Melitenensis, was present at the Fifth General Council. In 588 Tucillus, Miletinae civitatis episcopus, was deposed by Pope Gregory I, and his successor Trajan elected by the clergy and people of Malta in 599 AD. The last recorded Bishop of Malta before the Arab invasion of the Islands was a Greek by the name of Manas, who was subsequently incarcerated at Palermo, Sicily.

=== Period the Knights of St John ===
While the Maltese Islands were under the dominion of the Knights of Malta, from the 15th century through to the late 18th century, the Grand Master had the status of a prince of the Catholic Church, and enjoyed a special relationship with the Pope, which occasionally led to a considerable amount of friction with the local Bishops. Occasional attempts to implant Quakerism and other forms of Protestantism in the 17th century were unsuccessful.

=== French occupation ===
Over the years, the power of the Knights declined; their reign ended when Napoleon Bonaparte's fleet arrived in 1798, en route to his expedition of Egypt. As a ruse, Napoleon asked for safe harbor to resupply his ships, and then turned his guns against his hosts once safely inside Valletta. Grand Master Hompesch capitulated, and Napoleon stayed in Malta for a few days during which he systematically looted the moveable assets of the Order and established an administration controlled by his nominees. He then sailed for Egypt leaving a substantial garrison in Malta. Since the Order had also been growing unpopular with the local Maltese, the latter initially viewed the French with optimism. This illusion did not last long. Within months the French were closing convents and seizing church treasures. The Maltese people rebelled, and the French garrison of General Claude-Henri Belgrand de Vaubois retreated into Valletta. After several failed attempts by the locals to retake Valletta, they asked the British for assistance. Rear Admiral Lord Horatio Nelson decided on a total blockade, and in 1800 the French garrison surrendered.

=== Establishment of the Diocese of Gozo ===
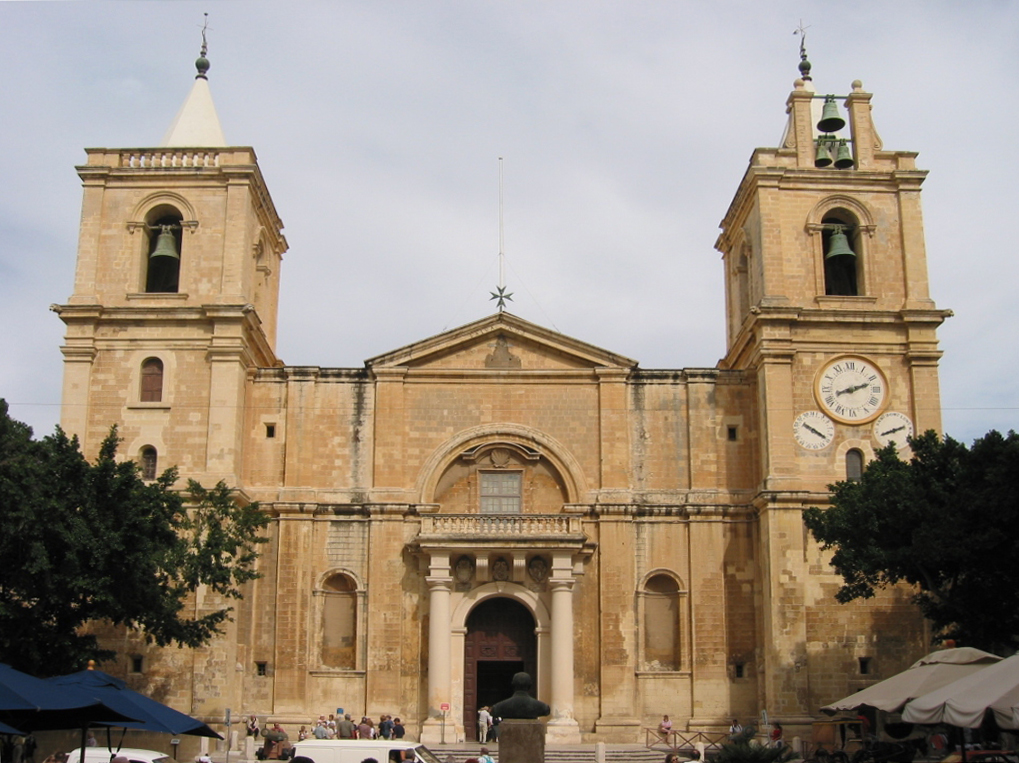
St John's Co-Cathedral

Historically part of the Diocese of Malta, Gozitans brought forward several petitions for the creation of an independent diocese, including in 1798, during the French occupation, and again in 1836. A third petition, brought directly to Pope Pius IX in 1855, met with success. Instrumental in this effort were a young priest named Don Pietro Pace, who would several years later serve as Bishop of Gozo, and Sir Adriano Dingli, Crown Advocate. The British Colonial Office signalled its approval in October 1860.

In 1863, Archpriest Michele Francesco Buttigieg was elected Auxiliary Bishop of Malta with instructions to reside in Gozo. One year later, on September 16, 1864, the Pope issued a Bull entitled "Singulari Amore" (With remarkable Love), which decreed that the islands of Gozo and Comino were separated from the Diocese of Malta. On September 22, 1864, Bishop Buttigieg was elected the first bishop of Gozo, with the "Matrice" in Victoria, dedicated to the Assumption of the Blessed Virgin (Maltese: "Marija Assunta"), serving as his Cathedral.

=== United Kingdom ===
In 1814, Malta became British in accordance with the Treaty of Paris. British rule lasted 150 years until 1964 when Malta gained independence. British rule brought the first sizeable population of members of the Anglican Church and Protestant denominations in the form of civil servants and retirees.

== Patron saints ==
=== Saint Paul ===
St. Paul is venerated as the patron saint of Malta. A number of parishes throughout Malta and Gozo are dedicated to him, including: the Cathedral Church at Mdina, the Collegiates of Rabat and Valletta, and the parishes of Ħal-Safi and Munxar.

=== Saint Publius ===
Saint Publius is the first Maltese Saint, a patron saint of Malta and Floriana, and also the first Bishop of the Maltese Islands. The Floriana Parish Church is dedicated to St. Publius. There is a huge devotion across Malta towards this Saint as he was also Maltese.

=== Saint Agatha ===
Saint Agatha, is also a patron Saint of Malta as during the persecution in Sicily she came to Malta and kept on teaching the Maltese the Christian faith.

Out of approximately 60 parishes in Malta and Gozo, 11 are dedicated to the Assumption. These include the Cathedral Church of Gozo, the parishes of Gudja, Ħal-Għaxaq, l-Imqabba, Qrendi, Mosta, Dingli, Attard, Mġarr, Birkirkara and Żebbuġ (Gozo). Many other churches have a treasured statue representing the mystery of the Assumption. As titular statues, they are the most treasured sacred artifacts of their respective communities. All statues in churches are kept with great care and devotion, however the devotion to statues representing patrons of villages is far greater than devotion to other representations.

Noteworthy details linked to the feast of the Assumption are the world-famous Mosta Rotunda (known as the Mosta Dome), the magnificent Gozo Cathedral found in the old Citadel Knisja Katidrali ta' Għawdex, and the annual fireworks display held on 14 August at Imqabba, organized by the St Mary Fireworks Factory of Imqabba, winners of the First Malta International Fireworks Festival (2006). This fireworks display is renowned as the best pyro-musical show on the island and thousands cram the village streets annually in order to watch it.Soċjetà Santa Marija u Banda Re Ġorġ V, Mqabba

== Current status and law ==
The Constitution of Malta provides for freedom of religion but establishes Roman Catholicism as the state religion. Freedom House and the World Factbook report that 98 per cent of the Maltese are Roman Catholic, making the nation one of the most Catholic countries in the world. The rate of regular mass attendance was estimated at 36.1% in 2017, down from 52.6% (51% for Malta Island, 72.7% for Gozo) in 2005. In 1995 the rate stood at 63.4%. There are two territorial jurisdictions: the Archdiocese of Malta and the Diocese of Gozo.

In public schools religious instruction in Roman Catholicism is part of the curriculum but students may opt to decline participation in religious lessons. Subsidies are granted to private Catholic schools.

Pope John Paul II made a total of three pastoral visits to Malta – twice in 1990 and once in 2001, during which he beatified three Maltese.

The percentage of people that attend Mass in every locality of Malta in 2005:

Locality	% of attenders
Mdina - St. Paul	88%
Kerċem - St. Gregory and Our Lady of Health	86%
San Lawrenz - St. Lawrence	85%
Fontana - Sacred Heart of Jesus	83%
Lija - Transfiguration of Jesus	78%
Victoria, Gozo - St. Mary and St. George	77%
Xewkija - St. John the Baptist	75%
Xagħra - Nativity of Our Lady	74%
Għarb - Visitation of Our Lady	75%
Għajnsielem - Our Lady of Loreto	73%
Qala - St. Joseph	72%
Mġarr - St. Mary	72%
Sannat - St. Margharite	70%
Għargħur- St. Bartholomew	67%
Għasri - Corpus Christi	66%
Nadur - St. Peter and St. Paul	66%
Balzan - The Annunciation	66%
Munxar - St. Paul	64%
Gudja - The Assumption of Our Lady	60%
Mosta - The Assumption of Our Lady	60%
Iklin - Holy Family	60%
Siġġiewi - St. Nicholas	58%
Rabat - St. Paul	58%
Dingli - The Assumption of Our Lady	57%
Attard - The Assumption of Our Lady	57%
Tarxien - The Annunciation	55%
Żebbuġ, Malta - St. Philip of Aggira	54%
Qormi - Parish of St. George and Parish of St. Sebastian	54%
Naxxar - Our Lady of Victory	54%
Santa Luċija - St. Pius X	54%
Ħamrun - Parish of St. Cajten and Parish of the Immaculate Conception	54%
Mellieħa - Our Lady of Victory	53%
Qrendi - The Assumption of Our Lady	53%
Żabbar - Our Lady of Graces	53%
Paola - Parish of Christ the King and Parish of Our Lady of Lourdes	52%
Marsaxlokk Our Lady of Pompeii	52%
Floriana - St. Publius	52%
Mqabba - The Assumption of Our Lady	52%
Żebbuġ, Gozo - The Assumption of Our Lady	52%
Żurrieq - St. Catherine of Alexandria	51%
Marsa - Parish of the Holy Trinity and Parish of Maria Regina	51%
Għaxaq - The Assumption of Our Lady	51%
Pembroke	51%
Kalkara - St. Joseph	51%
Żejtun - St. Catherine of Alexandria	50%
Safi - St. Paul	49%
Fgura - Our Lady of Monte Carmel	47%
Valletta - Parish of St. Paul's Shipwreck, Parish of Our Lady of Porto Salvo, and Parish of St. Augustine	47%
Kirkop - St. Leonard	45%
Birgu - St. Lawrence	45%
Msida - St. Joseph	45%
Birżebbuġa - St. Peter in Chains	43%
San Ġwann - Our Lady of Lourdes	43%
Mtarfa - St. Lucy	42%
Gżira - Our Lady of Monte Carmel	41%
Swieqi - The Immaculate Conception	41%
Marsaskala - St. Anne	40%
Bormla - The Immaculate Conception	39%
Luqa - St. Andrew	39%
Pietà - Our Lady of Fatima	38%
Isla - Our Lady of Victory	37%
San Pawl il-Baħar - Parish of Our Lady of Sorrows, Parish of Sacred Heart of Mary, and Parish of St. Francis of Assisi	36%

Other totals of people attending Mass, because these localities are not in percentage:

Locality	total of attenders
Balluta Bay - Our Lady of Monte Carmel	1,284
Birkirkara - Parish of St. Helen, Parish of Our Lady of Monte Carmel, Parish of St. Mary and Parish of St. Joseph the Worker	9,851
San Ġiljan - St. Julian	3,267
Santa Venera - St. Venera	2,508
Sliema - Parish of Stella Maris, Parish of Sacro Cour, Parish of St. Gregory the Great, and Parish of Jesus of Nazzareth	5,585

Additionally, between a quarter and a fifth of Mass attendees are active members of a Church Movement, group or initiatives such as the Catholic Charismatic Renewal, the Neocatechumenal Way, the Legion of Mary, Opus Dei, Youth Fellowship or other Church groups within the parish. Malta also has the highest number of members of the Neocatechumenal Way per population in the world.

Malta introduced divorce after a referendum on the 28 May 2011. In an SMS poll, Malta chose the Maltese cross to be the image on the Maltese Euro and rejected one of John the Baptist baptizing Jesus, which had garnered a strong majority in a previous poll, after attracting opposition even from the local Bishops who did not see it fit to place Jesus' face on a coin.

== Patron saints in Malta ==
- Assumption of Mary, the patron of Attard, Birkirkara, Bubaqra, Dingli, Gudja, Għaxaq, Mġarr, Mosta, Mqabba, Qrendi, Victoria, Malta, and Żebbuġ, Gozo
- Corpus Christi (Body of Christ), the patron of Għasri
- Christ the King, the patron of Paola, Malta
- Holy Family, the patron of Bidnija and Iklin
- Holy Trinity, the patron of Marsa, Malta
- Immaculate Conception, the patron of Bormla, Ħamrun, Mqabba, Qala and Swieqi
- Jesus of Nazareth, the patron of Sliema
- Maria Regina, the patron of Marsa, Malta
- Nativity of Mary, the patron of Mellieħa, Naxxar, Senglea, and Xagħra
- Our Lady of Fatima, the patron of Pietà, Malta
- Our Lady of Good Counsel, the patron of Paceville
- Our Lady of Graces, the patron of Xgħajra and Żabbar
- Our Lady of Lourdes, the patron of Paola, Malta, Qrendi and San Ġwann
- Our Lady of Mount Carmel, the patron of Balluta, Fgura, Fleur-de-Lys, Gżira, Valletta, Xlendi, and Żurrieq
- Our Lady of Pompeii, the patron of Marsaxlokk
- Our Lady of Porto Salvo, the patron of Valletta
- Our Lady of Sorrows, the patron of San Pawl il-Baħar
- Our Lady of Angels, the patron of Baħar iċ-Ċagħaq
- Our Lady of Loreto, the patron of Għajnsielem
- Our Lady of Perpetual Help, the patron of Kerċem
- Our Lady of Ta' Pinu, the patron of Gozo
- Our Lady, Star of the Sea, the patron of Sliema
- Risen Christ, the patron of Pembroke, Malta
- Sacred Heart of Jesus, the patron of Fontana, Malta
- Sacred Heart of Mary, the patron of Burmarrad and Sliema
- Saint Andrew, the patron saint of Luqa
- Saint Anne, the patron saint of Dwejra, Marsaskala and Żebbiegħ
- Saint Augustine of Hippo, the patron saint of Valletta
- Saint Bartholomew the Apostle, the patron saint of Għargħur
- Saint Cajetan, the patron saint of Ħamrun
- Saint Catherine of Alexandria, the patron saint of Żejtun and Żurrieq
- Saint Dominic, the patron saint of Birgu and Valletta
- Saint Francis of Assisi, the patron saint of Qawra
- Saint George, the patron saint of Qormi and Victoria, Malta
- Saint George Preca, the patron saint of Swatar (Birkirkara)
- Saint Gregory, the patron saint of Kerċem and Sliema
- Saint John of the Cross, the patron saint of Ta' Xbiex
- Saint John the Baptist, the patron saint of Valletta and Xewkija
- Saint Joseph, the patron saint of Birkirkara, Għaxaq, Kalkara, Kirkop, Manikata, Msida, Qala and Xemxija
- Saint Julian the Hospitaller, the patron saint of San Ġiljan
- Saint Helena (Empress), the patron saint of Birkirkara
- Saint Lawrence of Rome, the patron saint of Birgu and San Lawrenz
- Saint Leonard, the patron saint of Kirkop
- Saint Lucy, the patron saint of Mtarfa and Santa Luċija, Gozo
- Saint Margaret the Virgin, the patron saint of Sannat
- Saint Martin of Tours, the patron saint of Baħrija
- Saint Maximilian Kolbe, the patron saint of Buġibba
- Saint Nicholas, the patron saint of Siġġiewi
- Saint Paul, the patron saint of Marsalforn, Mdina, Munxar, Nadur Rabat, Malta, Safi, Malta, and Valletta
- Saint Peter, the patron saint of Birżebbuġa and Nadur
- Saint Philip of Agira, the patron saint of Żebbuġ, Malta
- Saint Pius X, the patron saint of Santa Luċija
- Saint Publius, the patron saint of Floriana, Malta
- Saint Sebastian, the patron saint of Qormi
- The Annunciation, the patron of Balzan and Tarxien
- The Transfiguration of Jesus, the patron of Lija
- Visitation of the Blessed Virgin Mary, the patron of Għarb

== Other saints venerated in Malta ==
- Mater Bon Consilii, the patron of Paceville
- Our Lady of Angels, the patron of Bahar ic-Caghaq
- Our Lady of the Abandoned, the patron of Wardija
- Our Lady of Cicero, in Zebbug, Gozo
- Our Lady of Doctrine, the patron of Tarxien
- Our Lady of Grotto, in Mellieha and Rabat, Malta
- Our Lady of Liesse, in Valletta
- Our Lady of Light, in Zebbug, Malta
- Our Lady of Lily, the patron of Mqabba
- Our Lady of Mercy, the patron of Bir id-Deheb
- Our Lady of Miracles, in Lija
- Our Lady of Montserrat, in Birgu
- Our Lady of Providence, in Siggiewi
- Our Lady of Rosary, the patron of Gudja
- Our Lady of Ta Pinu, in Gharb
- Our Lady of the Rock, in Gzira
- Saint Agatha, the patron of Malta
- Saint Albert
- Saint Alexis
- Saint Alphonsus
- Saint Alysius, in Birkirkara
- Saint Angel, in Zejtun
- Saint Anthony, patron of Birkirkara
- Saint Anthony the Abbot, in Mosta
- Saint Aristides
- Saint Barbara
- Saint Basil, in Mqabba
- Saint Benedict
- Saint Bernard
- Saint Bernadette
- Saint Baglan
- Saint Blaise
- Saint Cataldus
- Saint Cecil
- Saint Charles
- Saint Christopher
- Saint Claire
- Saint Clement
- Saint Clementin
- Saint Constantine
- Saint Cyrus
- Saint David, in Mtarfa
- Saint Deodatus
- Saint Dmitry, in Gharb
- Saint Edward, in Birgu
- Saint Elias
- Saint Elizabeth
- Saint Emidius
- Saint Erasmus, in Valletta
- Saint Faustina
- Saint Faustina Kowalska
- Saint Felix
- Saint Francis Xavier
- Saint Fredrick
- Saint Gabriel
- Saint Gerald
- Saint Henry
- Saint Ignatius of Loyola
- Saint James, in Zabbar
- Saint Jerome
- Saint Joachim
- Saint John, in Valletta
- Saint John Bosco
- Saint John Paul II
- Saint John the Evangelist
- Saint Lazare
- Saint Leo
- Saint Leopold
- Saint Liberata
- Saint Lucian
- Saint Luke
- Saint Mansuy
- Saint Marcianus
- Saint Mark
- Saint Martha
- Saint Martin, the patron of Bahrija
- Saint Mary Magdalene, the patron of Madliena
- Saint Matthew, in Qrendi
- Saint Maximilian Kolbe, the patron of Bugibba
- Saint Michael, the patron of Zabbar
- Saint Monica
- Saint Oswald, in Mtarfa
- Saint Pacifico
- Saint Patrick
- Saint Pius V
- Saint Porphyry
- Saint Raphael
- Saint Remigius
- Saint Rita
- Saint Roch
- Saint Rosa
- Saint Scholastica
- Saint Simon
- Saint Sophie
- Saint Sylvester
- Saint Stephen
- Saint Theodora
- Saint Theresa
- Saint Theresa of Calcutta
- Saint Thomas, in Marsaskala
- Saint Timothy
- Saint Trophimus
- Saint Ubaldesca
- Saint Ursula
- Saint Valentine, in Balzan
- Saint Victor
- Saint Vincent
- Saint Vincent de Paul, in Luqa
- Saint Vincent Ferrer
- Saint Zachary

== See also ==
- Malta
- List of Maltese Catholic saints
- List of monasteries and convents in Malta
- Religion in Malta
- Roman Catholicism in Malta
- Culture of Malta
- Maltese people
- Religion by country
