= Saint Faustina =

Saint Faustina may refer to:

- Saint Faustina (Como), 6th-century Italian nun, feast day January 18
- Saint Faustina Kowalska (1905–1938), Polish mystic, feast day October 5

== See also ==
- Saint Faustinus (disambiguation)
