= Religion in Malta =

Religion in Malta, age 15+ (2021 census)
1. Catholicism (82.6%)
2. Eastern Orthodoxy (3.60%)
3. Church of England (1.30%)
4. Other Christians (1.00%)
5. Islam (3.90%)
6. Hinduism (1.40%)
7. Buddhism (0.50%)
8. Judaism (0.30%)
9. Other religious groups (0.04%)
10. No religion (5.10%)

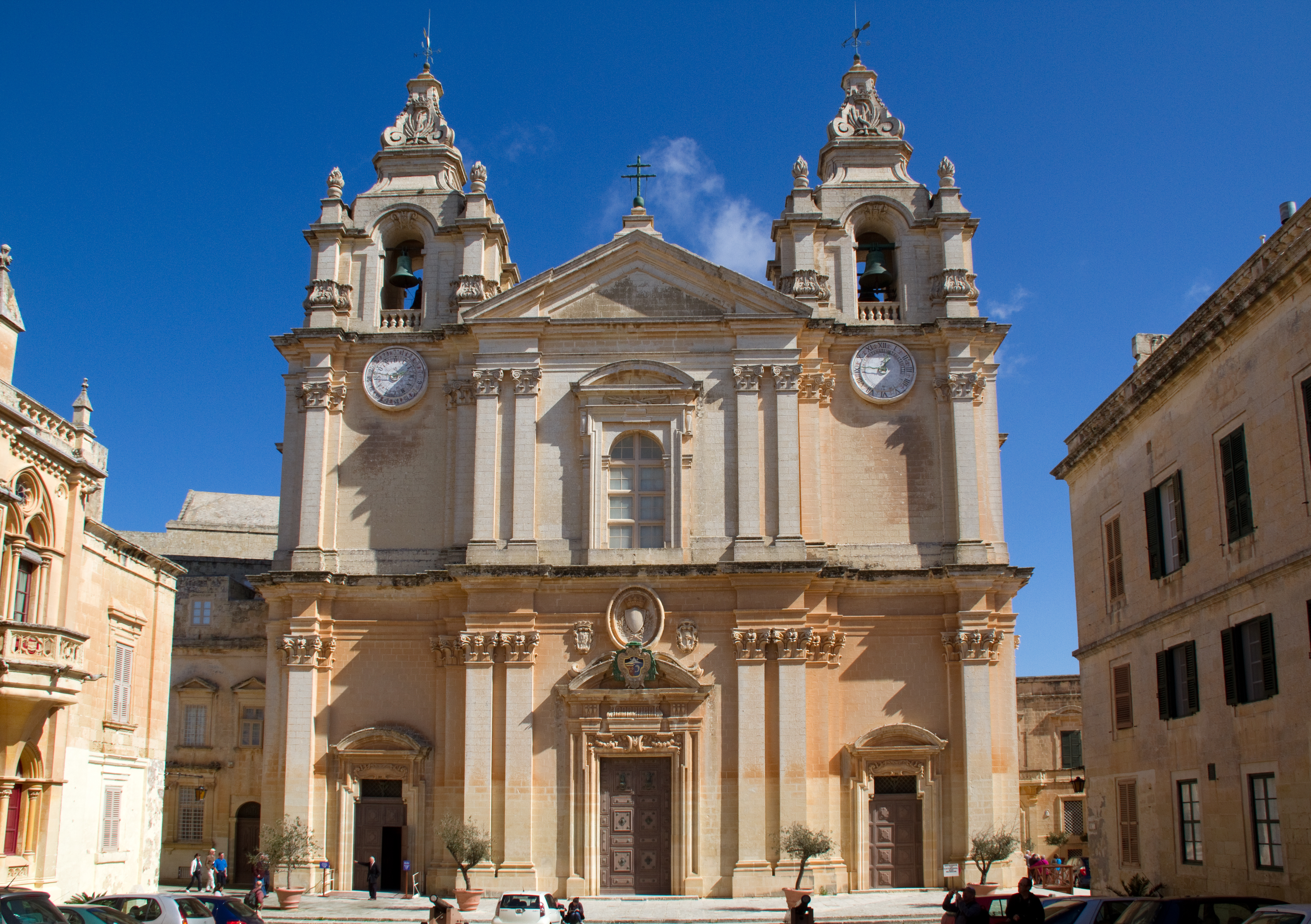
St. Paul's Cathedral in Mdina

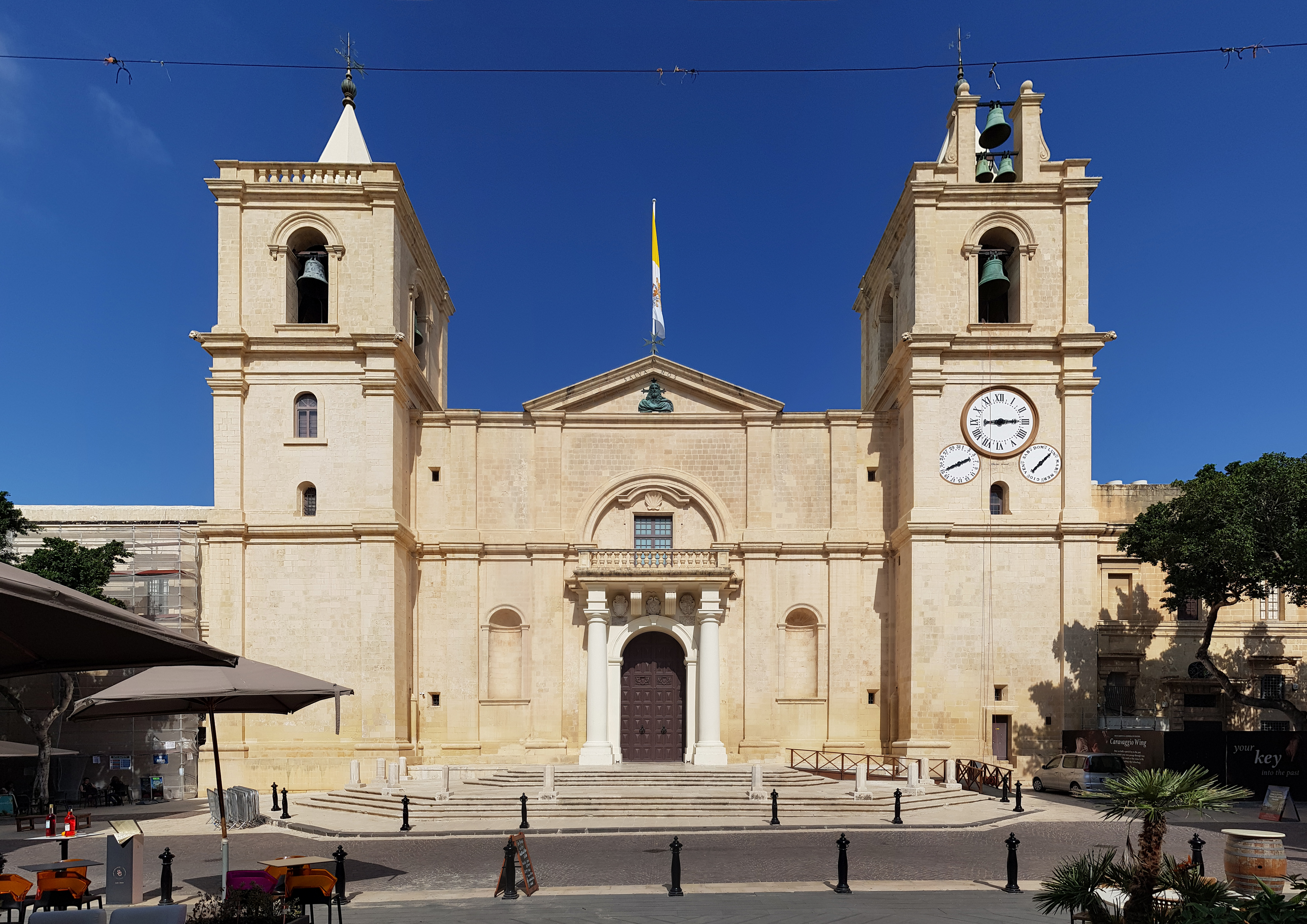
St. John's Co-Cathedral in Valletta

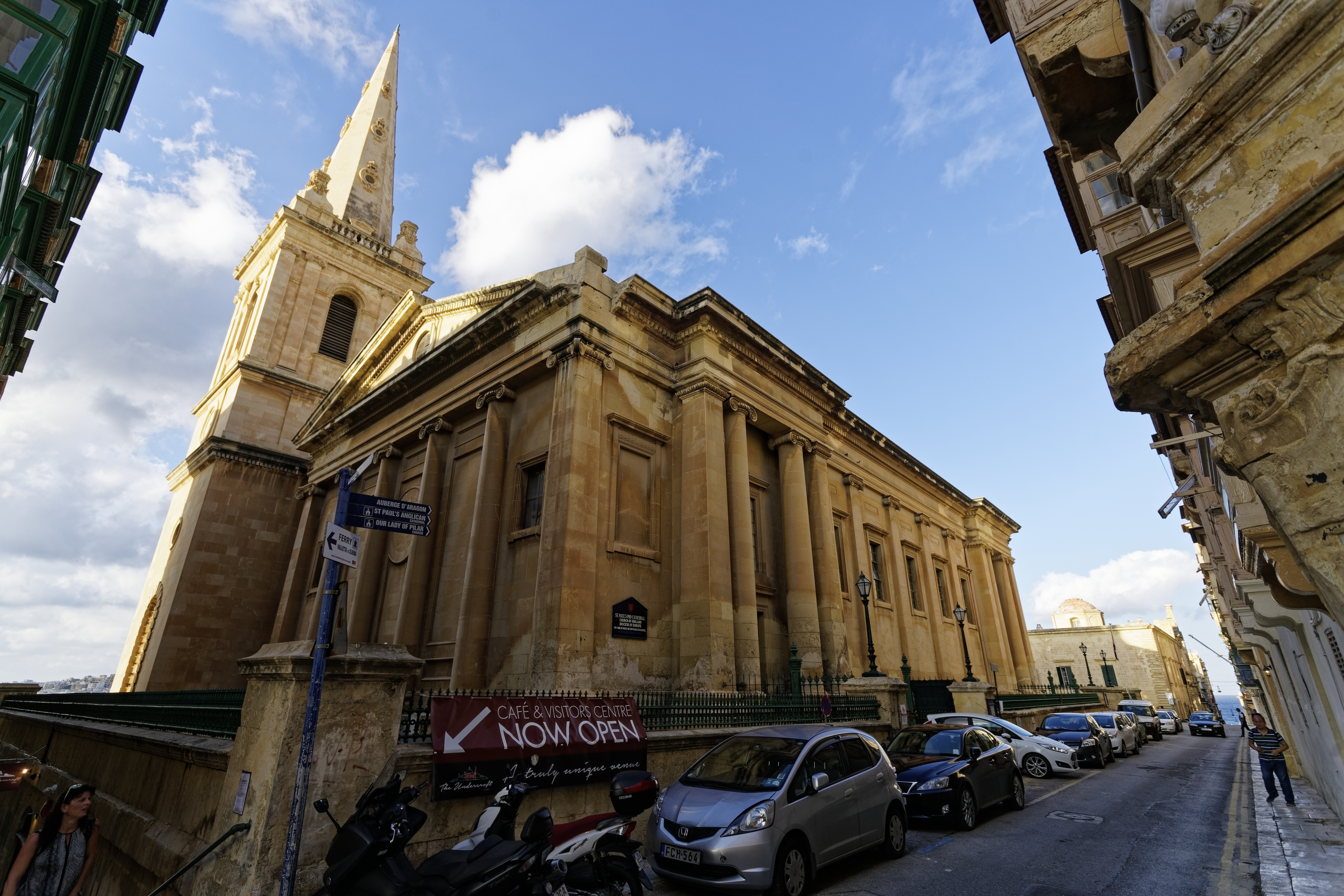
St Paul's Pro-Cathedral in Valletta, mother church of the Anglican church in Malta

Catholic Christianity is the predominant religion in Malta. The Constitution of Malta establishes Catholicism as the state religion, and it is also reflected in various elements of Maltese culture.

According to a 2018 survey, the overwhelming majority of the Maltese population adheres to Christianity (95.2%) with Catholicism as the main denomination (93.9%). According to a Eurobarometer survey conducted in 2019, 83% of the population identified as Catholic. Similarly, the 2021 census of the population found that 82.6% belonged to the Catholic church.

Malta's patron saints are St Paul, St Publius and St Agatha. The Assumption of Mary known as Santa Marija is the special patron of several towns in Malta and she is celebrated each 15 August.

Religion	2021 census
Catholic Christian	373,304
Muslim	17,454
Orthodox Christian	16,457
Hindu	6,411
Anglican Christian	5,706
Protestant Christian	4,516
Buddhist	2,495
Jewish	1,249
Other	911
None	23,243
Total	451,746

== Religion and the law ==
=== Constitutional standing ===
Article 2 of the Constitution of Malta states that the religion of Malta is the "Roman Catholic apostolic religion" (paragraph 1), that the authorities of the Catholic Church have the duty and the right to teach which principles are right and wrong (paragraph 2) and that religious teaching of the Catholic apostolic faith shall be provided in all state schools as part of compulsory education (paragraph 3).

Malta, a signatory to the Protocol 1 to the European Convention on Human Rights, made a declaration saying that it accepts the protocol's article 2 (on parents' right to have their children educated in line with their religious or philosophical views) only insofar "as it is compatible with the provision of efficient instruction and training, and the avoidance of unreasonable public expenditure, having regard to the fact that the population of Malta is overwhelmingly Roman Catholic".

However, article 2(1) and (3) of the Constitution are not entrenched, unlike article 40 which guarantees full freedom of conscience and of religious worship and bars the requirement of religious instruction or to show proficiency in religion. This means that if the provisions of article 2(1) and (2) are in conflict with the rights guaranteed under article 40, the provisions of the latter prevail. With regards to religious instruction in public schools for example, students may opt to decline participation in Catholic religious lessons.

Malta officially supported Italy and was one of ten states presenting written observations when the case Lautsi v. Italy was to be heard by the Grand Chamber of the European Court of Human Rights over the exhibiting of the crucifix in classrooms.

=== Religion and public policy ===
Malta was the last European country (excluding Vatican City) to introduce divorce in October 2011 after voting in a referendum on the subject earlier in the year.

Malta decriminalised vilification of religion in July 2016.

Abortion in Malta is illegal in all circumstances. Over the years some loopholes (non-inclusion of outer territorial waters, no mention of advertising) permitted individuals to circumvent the ban for limited time periods.

Assisted dying in Malta is illegal in all circumstances.

Same sex marriage has been legal since September 2017.

Catholic members of the medical profession are required by a State Regulation to abide by the tenets of the Roman Catholic Apostolic Religion.

Roman Catholic church schools are largely funded by the state and, under a 1993 Concordat with the Vatican, they are not obliged to provide any sex education.

There are state-sanctioned crucifixes in every hospital room, classroom and public building.

A prayer is recited at the start of every parliamentary sitting.

== Religious beliefs and participation ==
According to a Eurobarometer poll held in 2005, 95% of Maltese responded that they "believe there is a God", 3% responded that they "believe there is some sort of spirit or life force" and 1% responded that they "don't believe there is any sort of spirit, God or life force", which was the lowest percentage of non-believers in all countries surveyed, together with Turkey, Romania and Poland. 1% gave no response.

In a report published in 2006, it was reported that 52.6% of Maltese (older than 7 years and excluding those not able to attend) attended Sunday Mass in 2005, down from 75.1% in 1982 and 63.4% in 1995. Hence, Sunday Mass attendance has dropped annually by 1% since 1982. According to Archbishop Charles Scicluna, Sunday Mass attendance dropped further to roughly 40% by 2015. The 2017 census revealed that 36.1% of the catholic population attended Mass on the census day, which was over the course of a weekend in December 2017, a significant decline compared to previous years.

Church weddings have also declined since 2010, with a rapid increase in civil weddings. In 2010 a total of 1,547 church weddings and 740 civil weddings were registered. In 2018, church weddings declined to 1,129 while civil weddings increased to 1,423.

The number of students who opt out of studying religious knowledge in schools has increased. In 2014, an ethics class was created for those who choose not to attend school religion lessons, which are still part of the curriculum. In 2014, there was a total of 1,411 students who opted out of religions lessons; in 2019, the number increased to 3,422, an increase of 142%.

According to a 2018 survey, around 63.7% of the Maltese population considered themselves practicing members of their religion. In a 2021 State of the Nation survey commissioned by the Maltese President, 93% of respondents said they believe in God, and 60% said religion is important to them.

Church attendance in Malta among Catholics
Year	% of weekly church attendance in Malta among Catholics
1967	81.9
1982	75.1
1995	63.4
2005	52.6
2017	36.1

=== Vernacular cult and beliefs ===
- Karmni Grima, Our Lady of Ta' Pinu, Frenċ tal-Għarb, Our Lady of Mellieħa, Our Lady of Consecration

== Christianity in Malta ==
=== Catholicism in Malta ===
==== Catholic churches ====
On the islands of Malta and Gozo, which are two separate dioceses, there are a total of 359 churches (313 in Malta and 46 in Gozo). Of these, 78 are parishes (63 in Malta and 15 in Gozo) and six are national parishes. This means that there is a "church density" of slightly more than one church per square kilometer. In Malta, every locality has its parish church, apart from two or three small localities. There are also localities that have more than one parish church, like Sliema and Birkirkara, which have four parishes each.

==== Catholic organisations ====
- Zghazagh Azzjoni Kattolika: Catholic children and youth organization, member of Fimcap

==== Papal visits ====
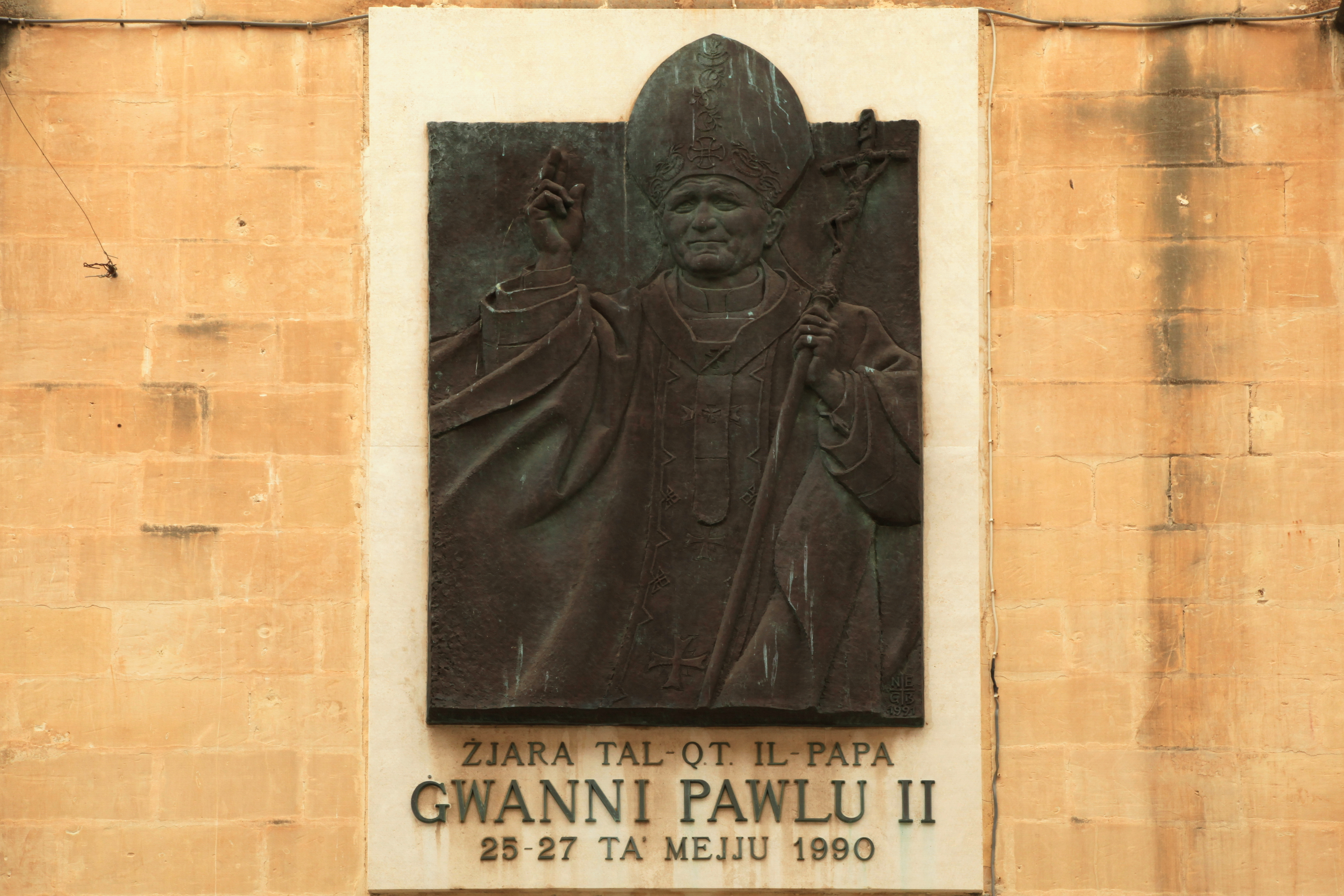
Plaque in Valletta commemorating Pope John Paul II's visit in 1990

Pope John Paul II made three pastoral visits to Malta: twice in 1990 and once in 2001. In his last visit he beatified three Maltese people: George Preca (who was then canonised in 2007), Nazju Falzon and Adeodata Pisani.

In April 2010, Pope Benedict XVI also visited Malta in celebration of 1,950 years since the shipwreck of Paul on the island of Malta.

In April 2022, Pope Francis visited Malta in commemoration of St Paul's Shipwreck on the island.

=== Other Christian denominations in Malta ===
==== Eastern and Oriental Orthodox churches ====
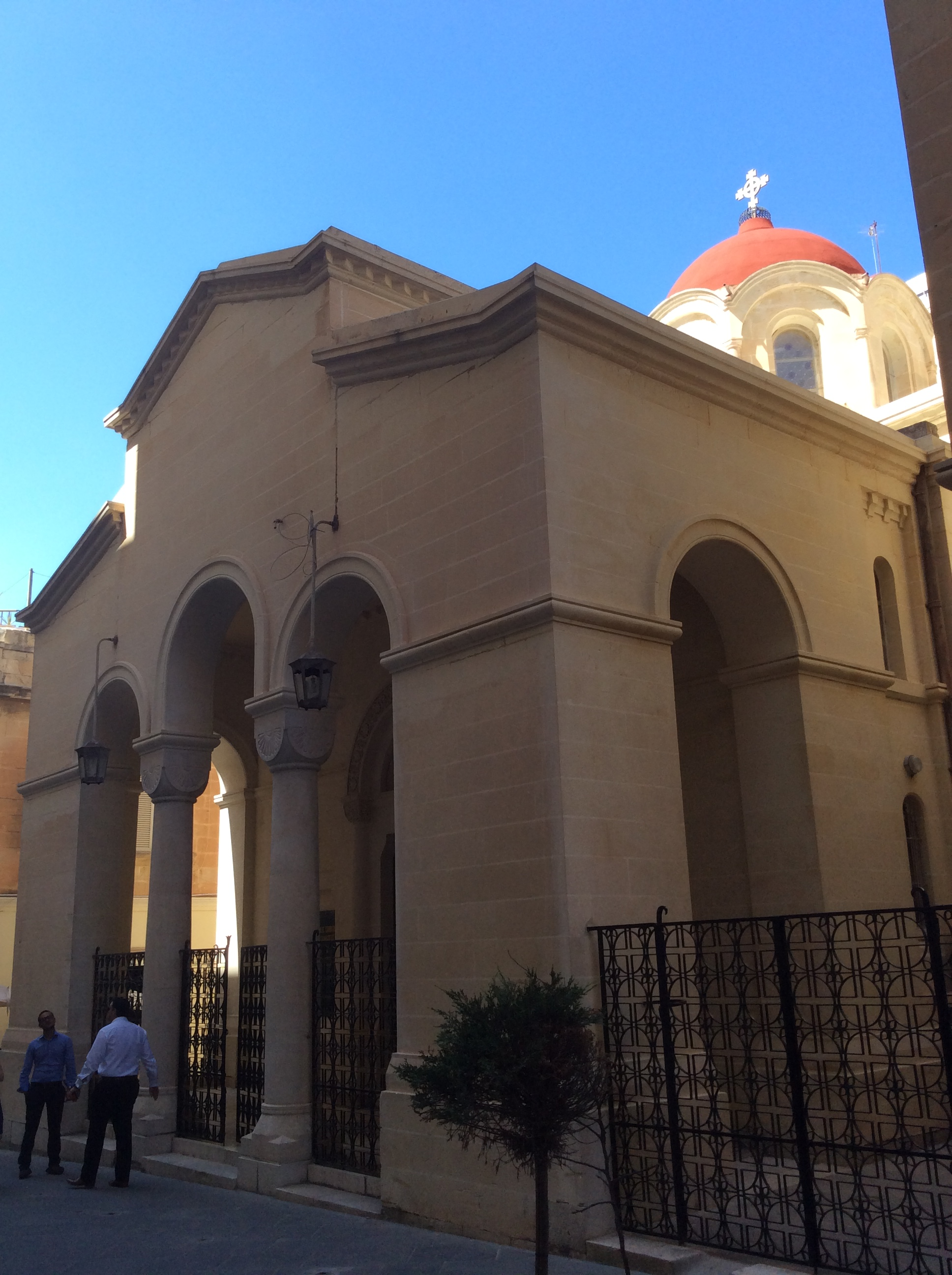
Church of Our Lady of Damascus, Valletta

The Eastern Orthodox presence in Malta has experienced a substantial increase. In 2014 there were at least 5,000 orthodox believers or 1.2% of the total population. The 2021 census found 16,457 Christian Orthodox believers.

The Russian Orthodox Church in Malta has its own parish of St Paul, however, they do not have a permanent church, and use the Greek Catholic church of Our Lady of Damascus in Valletta for services.

The Bulgarian Orthodox and Armenian Apostolic congregations also use the same church for services.

There is a Greek Orthodox congregation which has its own church of St George, part of the Greek Orthodox Archdiocese of Italy and Malta until the erection of a Malta exarchate in 2021.

The Romanian Orthodox Church congregation worships in St Roque's Church and is part of the Romanian Orthodox Diocese of Italy.

There is also a strong Serbian Orthodox congregation in Malta, who currently use the Parish Church of Saints Paul and Nicholas, the former parish church of Birżebbuġa for worship. The Serbian parish is part of the Serbian Orthodox Eparchy of Austria and Switzerland.

The Coptic Orthodox Church congregation forms part of the Patriarchate of Alexandria and worships in St James' Chapel in Żebbuġ.

There are also congregations belonging to the Ethiopian Orthodox Tewahedo Church and the Eritrean Orthodox Tewahedo Church, both of which use the Church of St James, Valletta.

==== Protestant churches ====
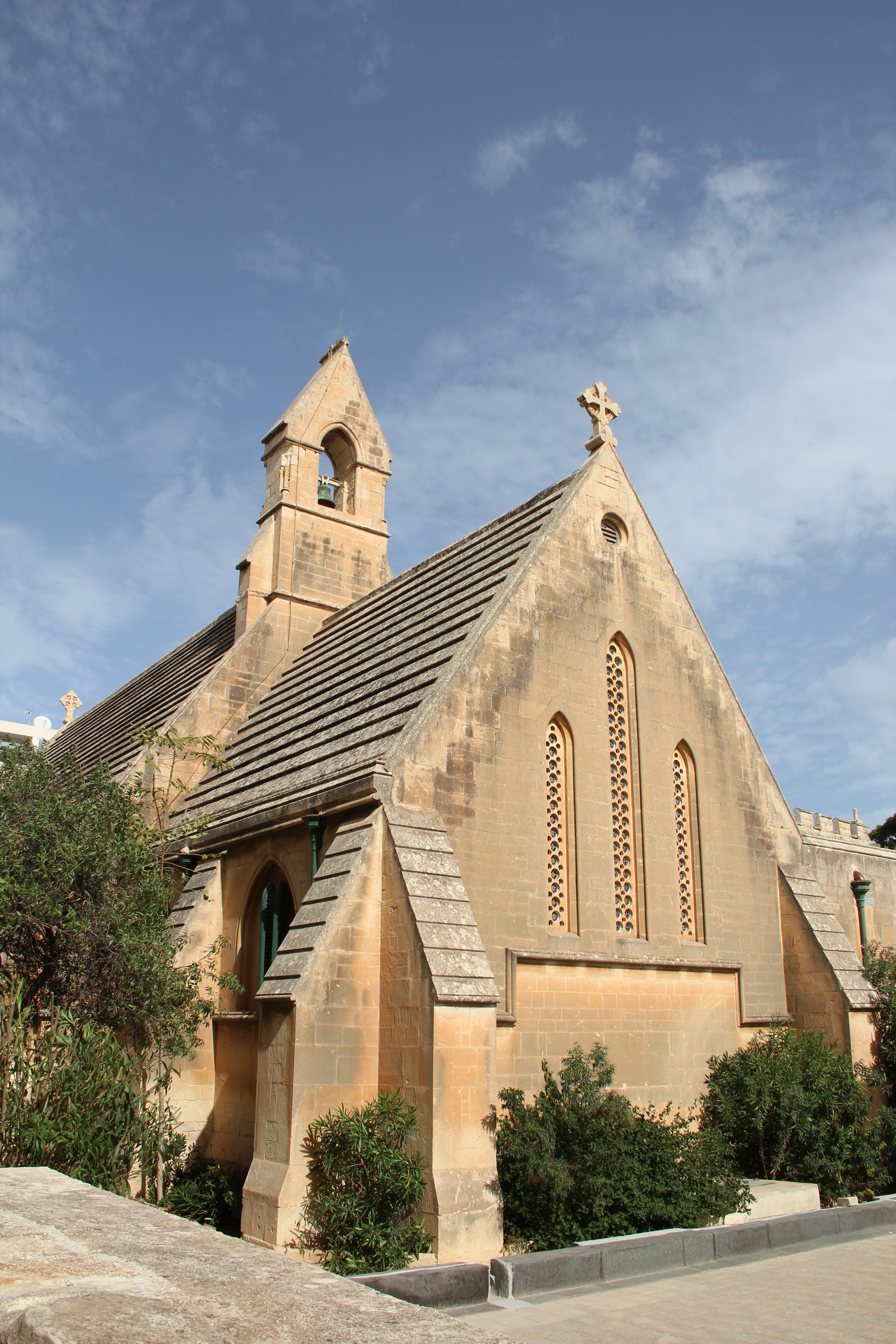
Trinity Church in Sliema

The Anglican church in Malta has two parish churches, St Paul's and Trinity, and one chaplaincy which covers all of Gozo. The parishes are part of the Diocese in Europe of the Church of England. There are around 300 active Anglicans in Malta however the inactive Anglican population is significantly higher.

There is also a Presbyterian congregation which united with the Methodist congregation in 1975 and today worship as one congregation in St Andrew's. The Presbyterian congregation is part of the International Presbytery of the Church of Scotland.

A Lutheran congregation, mostly made up of Germans and Scandinavians, worship in St Andrew's Church as well though as a separate congregation.

The Evangelical Alliance of Malta (TEAMalta) has five churches and two organisations that are affiliated, with about 500 members between them.

The Assemblies of God in Malta forms part of the World Assemblies of God which is the largest Pentecostal denomination in the world. Cornerstone Pentecostal Church is the main Assemblies of God Church in Malta and is a member of the Evangelical Alliance of Malta (TEAM).

The Bible Baptist Church caters to the Baptists congregation in Malta.

Other Protestant Denominations include: Christian Fellowship, New Life Christian, Pentecostalism (including Christian Assembly), New Apostolic Church The Redeemed Christian Church of God, Methodist Church of Great Britain,

A Church of Christ non-denominational congregation started to meet in Malta around 1975.

==== Others ====
As of 2020, there are a reported 10 congregations and 783 Jehovah's Witnesses in Malta, with 1,245 who attended the memorial of Jesus death that they host yearly.

The Church of Jesus Christ of Latter-day Saints (Mormons) also has two congregations in Malta.

== Non-Christian religions in Malta ==
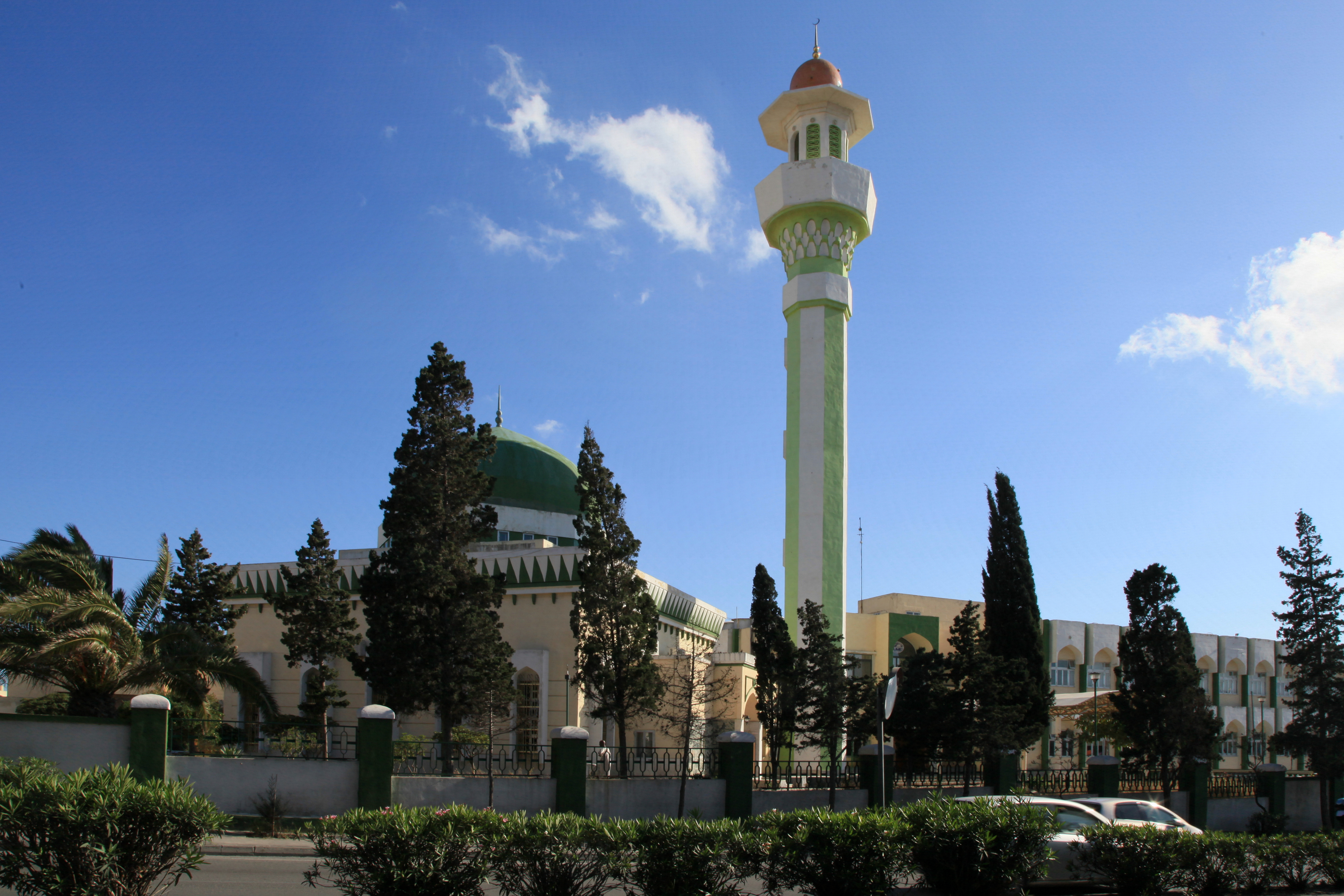
Mariam Al-Batool Mosque in Paola

There are at least 10 places of Muslim prayer and a Muslim faith school in Malta, but only one mosque with minaret. Of the estimated 3,000 Muslims in 2003, some 2,250 are foreigners, some 600 are naturalized citizens, and some 150 are native-born Maltese. The 2021 census found that the Muslim population in Malta grew from 6,000 in 2010 to 17,454 in 2021, mainly foreigners, totalling 3.9% of the population. Of these a small amount, 1,746, are Maltese citizens.

The Ahmadiyya Muslim Community is also present.

There is one Jewish congregation in Malta. There are various Hindu families in Malta that practice their own Hindu faith, but there are no Hindu temples, and the Hindu deceased are buried in Malta, instead of being cremated.

Zen Buddhism and the Baháʼí Faith also have about 40 members.

Paganism is also present in Malta, with a community counting at least 100 individuals who identify as such.

Humanists Malta gathered more than 2,000 followers since its foundation in 2010.

Combined, survey figures suggest that around half the population are not practicing Catholics, or adhere to a different religion, or to none.

== Non-religious in Malta ==
According to a 2018 survey, 3.9% of the Maltese population identified as atheist, and 12.9% as non-practicing members of their religion.

According to a 2021 survey, commissioned by the Maltese President, religion is not important to 10% of the population, and 3% said they did not believe in God.

The 2021 Maltese census found a total of 23,243 residents (5.1%) who stated that they did not belong to any religion, religious denomination, or body. Of those with no religious affiliation, a third (7,254) were Maltese citizens, while two-thirds were foreign residents.

== See also ==
- Christianity in Europe
- Culture of Malta
- Freemasonry in Malta
- History of Malta
- List of Churches in Malta
- List of Maltese saints
- Religion by country
- Religion in Europe
- Religion in the European Union
