= List of Maltese Catholic saints =

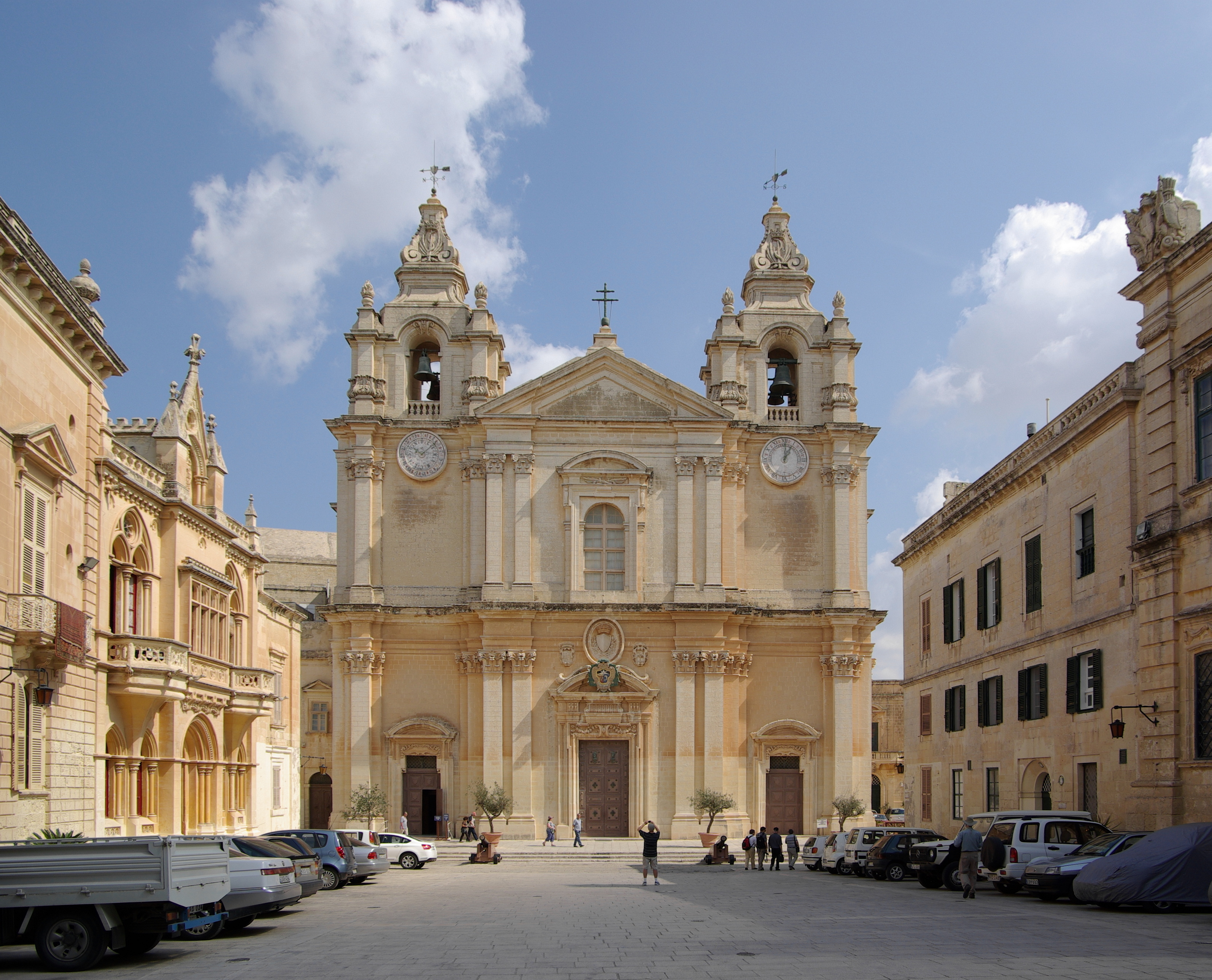
St. Paul's Cathedral, seat of the Archbishop of Malta

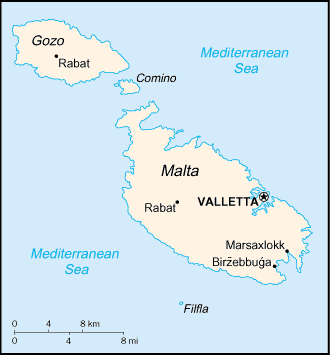
The Republic of Malta comprises its mainland and the islands of Gozo and Comino.

The Catholic Church recognizes some deceased Catholics as saints, blesseds, venerables, and Servants of God. Some of these people have been associated with the nation of Malta. There are only two dioceses in the island group of Malta, and these are the Roman Catholic Archdiocese of Malta and its suffragan diocese, the Roman Catholic Diocese of Gozo. The first Maltese saint in the history of Malta is Saint Publius, who died around the year 112 A.D.

== Saints ==
- Saint Publius (ca. 33–112 A.D.), first Bishop of Malta (Malta - Athens, Greece)
  - Canonized: Pre-Congregation
- Saint Ġorġ Preca (1880–1962), Priest of the Archdiocese of Malta; Founder of the Society of Christian Doctrine; Member of the Third Order Carmelites (Valletta – Santa Venera, Malta)
  - Declared "Venerable": June 28, 1999
  - Beatified: May 9, 2001 by Pope John Paul II
  - Canonized: June 3, 2007 by Pope Benedict XVI

== Blesseds ==
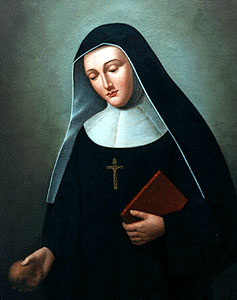
Blessed Maria Adeodata Pisani

- Blessed Teresa Pisani (Maria Adeodata) (1806–1855), Professed Religious of the Benedictine Nuns (Naples, Italy – Mdina, Malta)
  - Declared "Venerable": April 24, 2001
  - Beatified: May 9, 2001 by Pope John Paul II
- Blessed Nazju Falzon (1813–1865), Cleric of the Archdiocese of Malta; Member of the Secular Franciscans (Valletta, Malta)
  - Declared "Venerable": October 23, 1987
  - Beatified: May 9, 2001 by Pope John Paul II
- Blessed Jeanne Littlejohn (Angèle-Marie) (1933–1995), Professed Religious of the Missionary Sisters of Our Lady of Apostles; Martyr (Tunis, Tunisia – Algiers, Algeria)
  - Declared "Venerable": 26 January 2018
  - Beatified: December 8, 2018 by Cardinal Giovanni Angelo Becciu

== Venerables ==
- Virginja de Brincat (rel. name: Margerita of the Sacred Heart of Jesus) (1862–1952), Cofounder of the Franciscan Sisters of the Heart of Jesus (Gozo, Malta)
  - Declared "Venerable": 27 January 2014

== Servants of God ==
- Adelaide Cini (1838–1885), Layperson of the Archdiocese of Malta (Valletta – Ħamrun, Malta)
- Maria Teresa Nuzzo (1851–1923), Founder of the Daughters of the Sacred Heart (Valletta – Ħamrun, Malta)
- Isidor Formosa (1851–1931), Priest of the Archdiocese of Malta; Founder of the Ursuline Sisters of Malta (Valletta, Malta)
- Ġużeppi de Piro (1877–1933), Priest of the Archdiocese of Malta; Founder of the Missionary Society of Saint Paul (Mdina – Ħamrun, Malta)
- Franġisk Grima (1908–1939), Priest of the Diocese of Gozo (Gozo, Malta)
- Lwiġi Fenech (rel. name: Avertan) (1871–1943), Professed Priest of the Carmelites of the Ancient Observance (Il-Mosta – Mdina, Malta)
- Ewgenju Borg (1886–1967), Layperson of the Archdiocese of Malta; Consecrated Member of the Society of Christian Doctrine (Isla – Ħamrun, Malta)
- Ġemma Camilleri (1889-1973), Professed Religious of the Franciscan Sisters of the Heart of Jesus (Gozo, Malta)
- Emanuel Galea (1891–1974), Auxiliary Bishop of Malta (Isla – Żejtun, Malta)
- Mikiel Azzopardi (1910–1987), Priest of the Archdiocese of Malta (Valletta, Malta)
- Henry Casolani (1917–1999) and Inez Vassallo Casolani (1915–1992), Married Layperson of the Archdiocese of Malta (Cospicua – Valletta, Malta)
- Mikiel Attard (1933–2004), Priest of the Diocese of Gozo (Gozo, Malta)
- Nazzareno Gauci (rel. name: Grazzja) (1911–2005), Professed Priest of the Augustinians (Gozo – Birkirkara, Malta)
- Brother Louis Camilleri (rel. name: Antonio) (1923–2011), Professed Religious of the Brothers of the Christian Schools (De La Salle Brothers) (Żurrieq – Gzira, Malta)

== Candidates for sainthood ==
- Andrea Xuereb [Xuérès or Xuareb] (d. 1378), Professed Priest of the Dominicans (Malta – Syracuse, Italy)
- Santo Benigno Grech (rel. name: Rosario) (1723–1793), Professed Priest of the Dominicans (Valletta, Malta – Palermo, Italy)
- Tancredi Alfred Agius (rel. name: Ambrose) (1856–1911), Professed Priest of the Benedictines; Titular Archbishop of Palmyra; Apostolic Nuncio to the Philippines (Alexandria, Egypt – Manila, Philippines)
- Pietro Pace (1831–1914), Bishop of Malta; Titular Archbishop of Rhodes (Gozo, Malta)
- Giovanna Borg (rel. name: Veronica of the Holy Spirit) (1890–1918), Professed Religious of the Benedictine Nuns (Birkirkara – Valletta, Malta)
- Karmni Grima (1838–1922), Layperson of the Diocese of Gozo (Gozo, Malta)
- Ġużeppi Diacono (1847–1924), Priest of the Diocese of Gozo; Founder of the Franciscan Sisters of the Heart of Jesus (Gozo, Malta)
- Franġisk Portelli (1854–1926), Layperson of the Diocese of Gozo; Member of the Secular Franciscans (Gozo, Malta)
- Francesca Tereża Parlar (1842–1927), Layperson of the Archdiocese of Malta; Member of the Lay Dominicans (Valletta, Malta)
- Ġużepp Portelli (1880–1949), Priest of the Diocese of Gozo (Gozo, Malta)
- Karm Cachia (1882–1950), Priest of the Diocese of Gozo (Gozo, Malta)
- Carlo Manché (1905–1950), Priest of the Archdiocese of Malta (Valletta – Gzira, Malta)
- Ġuża Bugeja (1927–1964), Layperson of the Archdiocese of Malta (Rabat, Malta)
- Francis Xavier Mercieca (Frenċ tal-Għarb) (1892–1967), Layperson of the Diocese of Gozo (Gozo, Malta)
- Emmanuela Vassallo (1942–1989), Professed Religious of the Franciscan Missionaries of Mary; Martyr (Valletta, Malta – Tripoli, Libya)
- Egidio Galea (1918–2005), Professed Priest of the Augustinians (Birgu, Malta)
- Guido de Marco (1931–2010), Married Layperson of the Archdiocese of Malta; President of Malta (Valletta – Msida, Malta)
- Charles Vella (1928–2018), Priest of the Archdiocese of Malta; Founder of the Cana Movement (Gżira – Sliema, Malta)
- Helen Gladys Douglas (rel. name: Mary Frederick) (1935–2024), Professed Religious of the Missionaries of Charity (Valletta, Malta – Rome, Italy)
