= Għarb =

Għarb L-Għarb Garbo
- Local council
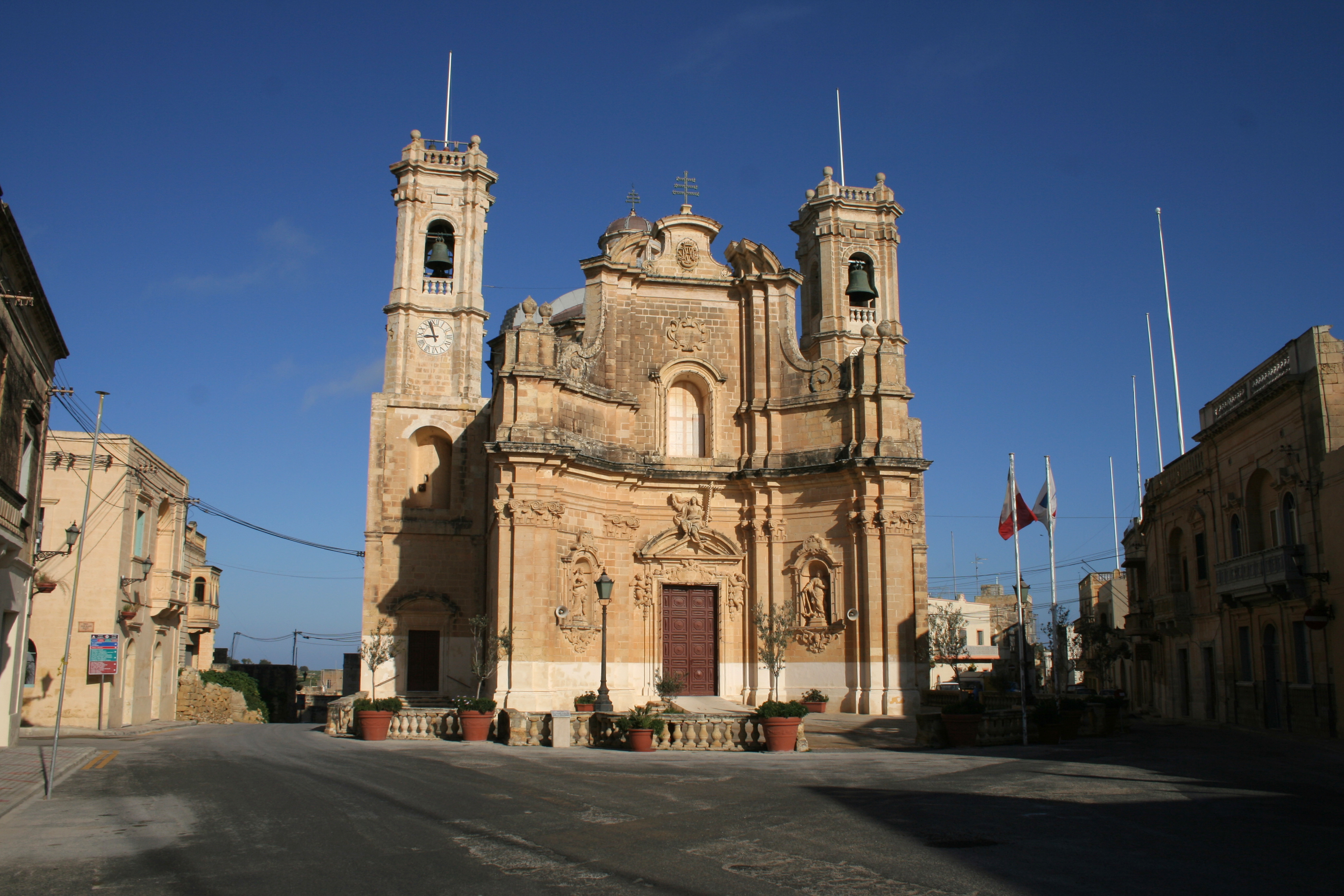
- Collegiate Basilica of the Visitation

- Flag Coat of arms
- Motto(s): In Estremo Vigilat (Sentinel at the Borderline)
- Għarb
- Coordinates: 36°3′40″N 14°12′33″E
- Country: Malta
- Region: Gozo Region
- District: Gozo and Comino District
- Borders: Kerċem, Għasri, San Lawrenz

Government
  - Mayor: David Apap Agius (Għarb l-Ewwel)

Area
  - Total: 4.6 km^{2} (1.8 sq mi)

Population (Jul 2024)
  - Total: 1,595
  - Density: 350/km^{2} (900/sq mi)
- Demonym: Tal-Għarb
- Time zone: UTC+1 (CET)
  - Summer (DST): UTC+2 (CEST)
- Postal code: GRB
- Dialing code: 356
- ISO 3166 code: MT-14
- Patron saint: Visitation of Our Lady to Saint Elizabeth
- Website: Official website

Għarb (Maltese: L-Għarb) is an administrative unit of Malta, located at the westernmost point of the island of Gozo. The population of Għarb was 1,595 in July 2024. This included 796 males and 799 females; 1,228 Maltese nationals and 367 foreign nationals.

== Etymology ==
The name Għarb (غرب) comes from the Arabic word for "West," referring to the village being at the westernmost point on Gozo and all of the Maltese archipelago.

== History ==
Għarb started as a small hamlet which developed around the Middle Ages. One can see its ancient roots in the centre of the village where some houses have fine examples of decorated stone balconies. Għarb was created as a parish in 1679, a move which gave impetus for the building of a new, baroque parish church. Built between 1699 and 1729, it has a façade which has been compared to Francesco Borromini's Church of Saint Agnes in Piazza Navona, Rome. On the square is a folklore museum housing memorabilia recounting the rural history of the Maltese islands.

== Landmarks ==
Għarb lies in some of Gozo's most scenic countryside, particularly at Dbieġi, the highest hill on Gozo. Also at Dbieġi is a centre for Gozitan crafts. Within the limits of Għarb is the Chapel of San Dimitri. According to legend, the first chapel was built on the cliff side by a woman whose son was freed from captivity by St. Demetrius. Also nearby is the Basilica ta' Pinu, Malta's pre-eminent shrine to Our Lady of Ta' Pinu. The parish church, also a basilica, is dedicated to the Visitation of Saint Mary to her cousin Saint Elizabeth.

== Zones in Għarb ==
- Birbuba
- Ħodba
- Il-Wileġ
- San Katald
- Ta' Lamuta
- Ta' Pinu
- Ta' Santu Pietru
- Il-Fgura
- Taż-Żejt
- il-Wilġa
- Wied tal-Knisja
- Wied il-Mielaħ
- Ta' Ħries
- Fuq il-Blata
- Tat-Trux
- Il-Misraħ

== Notable people ==
- Frenċ tal-Għarb
- Karmni Grima
- Nikol Ġużeppi Cauchi
- Nazzareno Formosa
- Ġużepp Portelli

== Twin towns – sister cities ==
Għarb is twinned with:

- Castrolibero, Italy
- Massafra, Italy
- Pace del Mela, Italy
- Tortona, Italy
- Torrent, Spain
- Cépet, France
