= Church of St George, Valletta =

Church of St George
- Il-Knisja Ortodossa ta' San Ġorġ
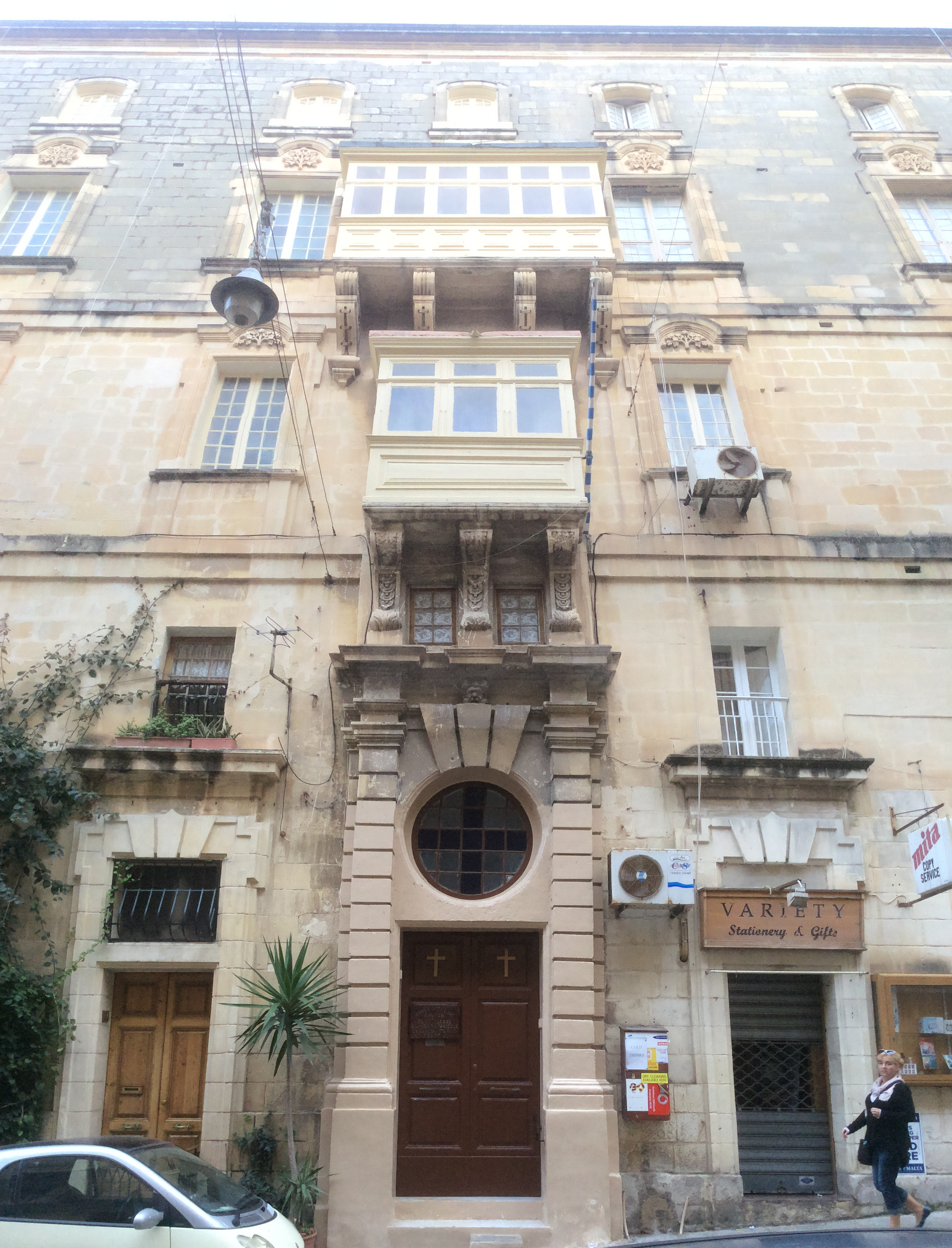

- Location within Malta
- 35°53′56.6″N 14°30′57.3″E
- Location: Valletta
- Country: Malta
- Denomination: Greek Orthodox Church

History
- Status: Church
- Founded: 1816
- Dedication: Saint George

Architecture
- Functional status: Active

Administration
- Archdiocese: Italy and Malta

Clergy
- Archbishop: Gennadios Zervos
- Priest: Nathanael Felesakis

The Church of St George is a Greek Orthodox Church situated in Valletta, Malta. It is one of the orthodox churches in Malta.

== Origins ==
The church was founded 1816 by Greeks living in Malta. The church falls under the jurisdiction of the Ecumenical Patriarch of Constantinople. The certificates of baptisms, marriages and deaths that took place at this church are located at the Mdina Cathedral museum archives.

== See also ==
- Culture of Malta
- History of Malta
- List of Churches in Malta
- Religion in Malta
