= Ta' Pinu =

Roman Catholic basilica in Gozo

Basilica of the Blessed Virgin Of Ta' Pinu Santwarju tal-Madonna ta' Pinu
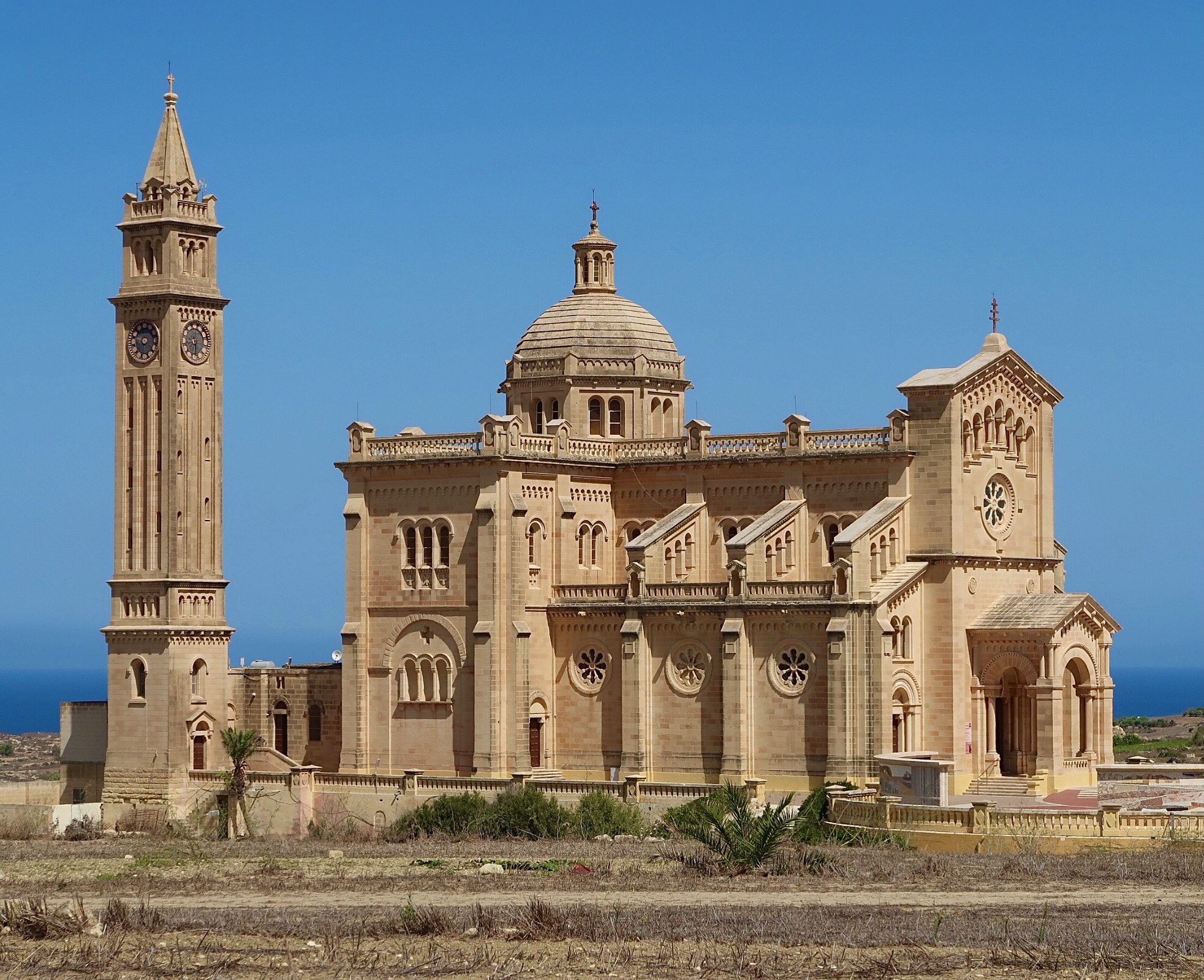
- Ta' Pinu in 2020

Religion
- Affiliation: Roman Catholic
- Diocese: Diocese of Gozo
- Province: Archdiocese of Malta
- Ecclesiastical or organisational status: Minor basilica, National Shrine
- Leadership: Fr Gerard Buhagiar
- Year consecrated: 31 August 1932

Location
- Interactive map of Basilica of the Blessed Virgin Of Ta' Pinu; Santwarju tal-Madonna ta' Pinu
- Coordinates: 36°3′42.4″N 14°12′53.4″E

Architecture
- Architect: Andrea Vassallo (Note: Completed by Godwin Galizia)
- Type: Church
- Style: Neo-romanesque
- Groundbreaking: 30 May 1920

Specifications
- Direction of façade: ESE
- Length: 49 metres (161 ft)
- Width: 37 metres (121 ft)
- Width (nave): 14 metres (46 ft)
- Height (max): 61 metres (200 ft)

Website
- www.tapinu.org

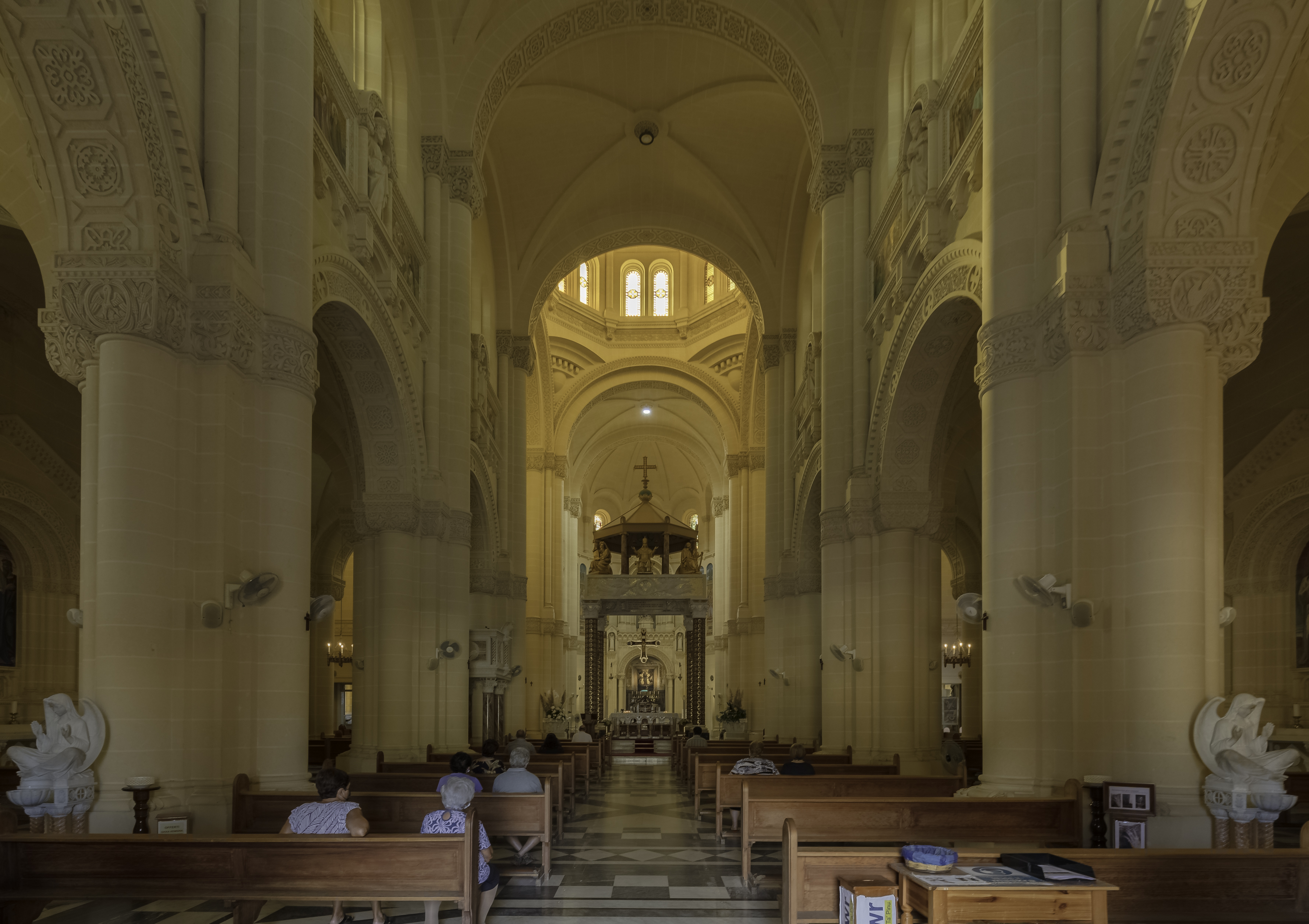
View of the interior

The Basilica of the National Shrine of the Blessed Virgin of Ta' Pinu (Maltese: Santwarju Bażilika tal-Madonna ta' Pinu) is a Roman Catholic minor basilica and national shrine located some 700 metres (2,300 ft) from the village of Għarb on the island of Gozo, the sister island of Malta.

Pope Pius XI granted a Pontifical decree of coronation, Marianum exstat Sanctuarium towards its venerated Marian image, the Blessed Virgin of Ta' Pinu on 24 May 1935. The Archbishop of Tarsus, Cardinal Alexis Lépicier signed and the Regent of Apostolic Dataria, Giuseppe Guerri notarized the decree via the Sacred Congregation of Rites. The coronation of the image took place on 20 June 1935.

== History ==
The origins of the Shrine of Our Lady of ta' Pinu are unknown. It was first recorded in the archives of the Curia in Gozo, when the Bishop Domenico Cubelles paid a visit to the chapel. This noted that the chapel had just been rebuilt and that it belonged to the noble family of "The Gentile".

In 1575 the apostolic visitor Pietro Dusina was delegated by Pope Gregory XIII to visit the Maltese Islands. In his pastoral visit to the church, he found that it was in a very bad state. He ordered the church to be closed and demolished and its duties passed to the parish church, now the Cathedral of the Assumption of the Blessed Virgin Mary of Gozo. When demolition began the workman broke his arm while striking the first blow. This was taken as an omen that the chapel should not be demolished. The church was the only chapel on the island to survive Dusina's decree ordering the demolition of other similar chapels.

Pinu Gauci became the procurator of the church in 1598 and its name was changed from "Of the Gentile" to "Ta` Pinu", meaning "Of Philip". In 1611 Gauci offered money for its restoration. It was rebuilt, with a stone altar erected and investments for liturgical services provided. Gauci also commissioned the painting of the Assumption of Our Lady for the main altar. This was done in 1619 by Amadeo Perugino.

In 1883, Karmni Grima was walking past the now run down church and heard a voice asking her to recite three "Hail Marys". Over the following years miracles were attributed to the grace of Our Lady of The Assumption to whom the church was dedicated. Francis Portelli also heard the voice coming from the painting. Francis Merċieċa also known as Frenċ tal-Għarb was a devout of Our Lady of ta' Pinu and healed a lot of people in her name.

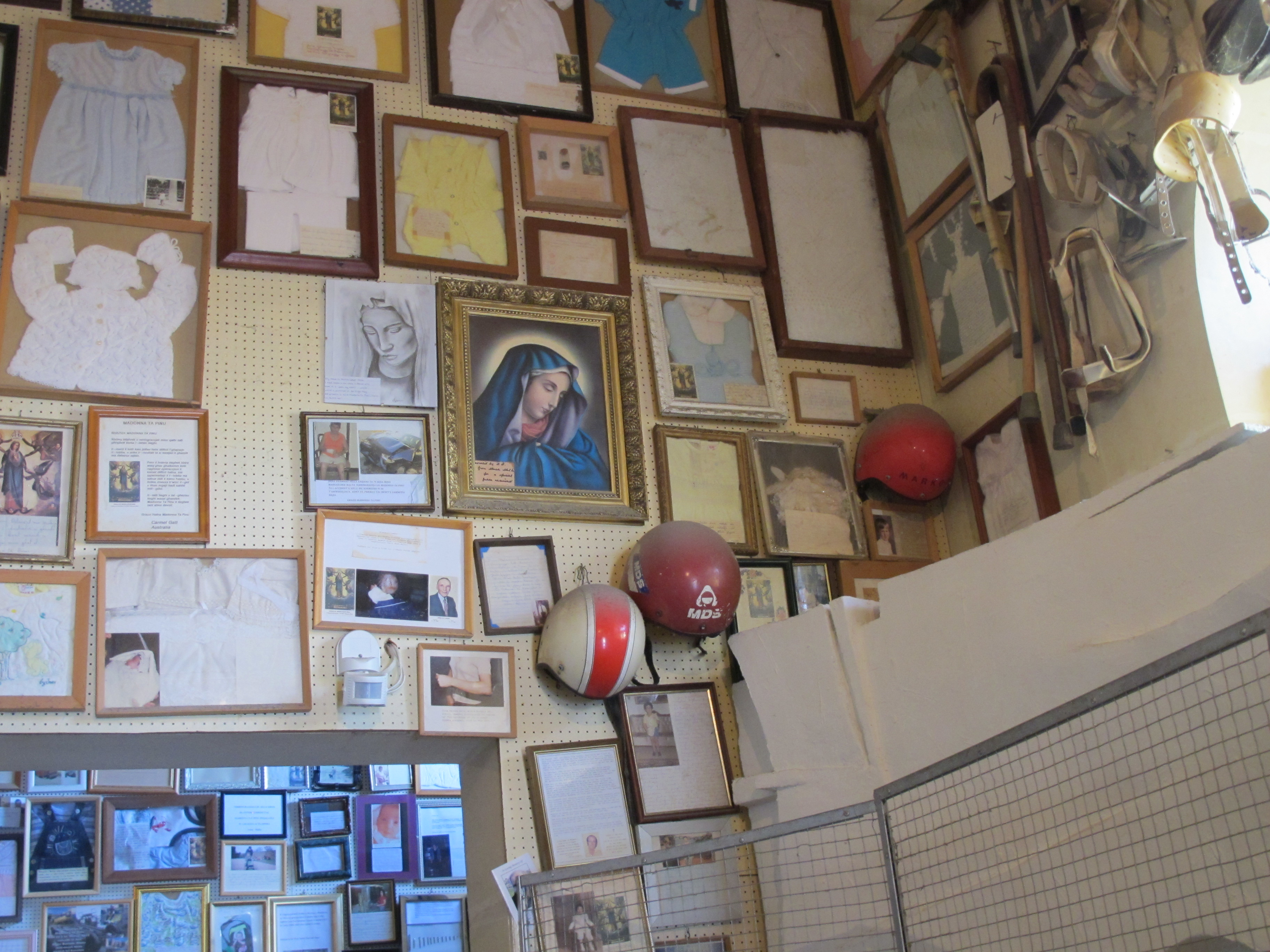
Some of the ex-voto in the Ta' Pinu church.

The works for the new church began on 30 May 1920 on the initiative of the church's rector Monsignor Ġużepp Portelli and was consecrated on 31 August 1932. It was built in a neo-romantic style. Inside the church there are 6 mosaics, 76 coloured windows and many ex-voto. The bell tower is 61 metres high.

Pope John Paul II celebrated mass on the parvise of the shrine during his visit to the island of Gozo on 26 May 1990. On 18 April 2010, when visiting Malta, Pope Benedict XVI donated and placed a Golden Rose in front of the devotional image of Our Lady Of Ta' Pinu which was brought over from Gozo to Malta for this special occasion. The Pope invited everybody to pray to Mary under the title "Queen of the Family".

On 2 April 2022, after visiting the Chapel of Our Lady and praying there in silence, Pope Francis presided at a Prayer Meeting on the parvis of the church.

The church building is listed on the National Inventory of the Cultural Property of the Maltese Islands.

== See also ==
- Culture of Malta
- History of Malta
- List of Churches in Malta
- Religion in Malta
