= Nazzareno Formosa =

The Reverend Nazzareno Formosa
- Curate of Sacred Hearts Church
- Church: Roman Catholic
- Archdiocese: New York
- In office: 1927-1937

Orders
- Ordination: 2 August 1925

Personal details
- Born: March 29, 1901 Għarb, Gozo, Malta
- Died: July 22, 1937 (aged 36) New York City, United States
- Buried: St. John Cemetery (Queens)
- Residence: 307, East 33rd Street Manhattan
- Parents: Nikol Formosa & Maria Caruana

Nazzareno Formosa (29 March 1901 - 22 July 1937) was an American-Maltese Roman Catholic priest who served as curate of the Parish Church of the Sacred Hearts of Jesus and Mary in Manhattan, New York City.

== Biography ==
Rev. Nazzareno Formosa was born in the village of Għarb, Gozo, Malta, on 29 March 1901 to Nikola Formosa and Maria Caruana, the last to be born of 8 children. He studied in Italy and was ordained a priest on August 2, 1925. In 1927 he emigrated to the United States to minister to the growing Maltese population in New York City. He became a naturalized American citizen and was incardinated as a priest of the Archdiocese of New York. He was then assigned to the parish of the Sacred Hearts of Jesus and Mary as curate to Monsignor Joseph Congedo.

For the next ten years Reverend Formosa ministered to both the parishioners of Sacred Hearts Parish and to the Maltese community in Manhattan and Astoria, Queens. He served as the chaplain to numerous associations formed within the Maltese community in New York. Nazzareno died in Columbus Hospital on 22 July 1937, at the age of 36, as a result of appendicitis. His funeral was held at the Church of the Sacred Hearts of Jesus and Mary which was attended by almost 800 people. He was buried in St John Cemetery in Queens.
