= Blessed Virgin of Ta' Pinu =

Marian apparition in Malta

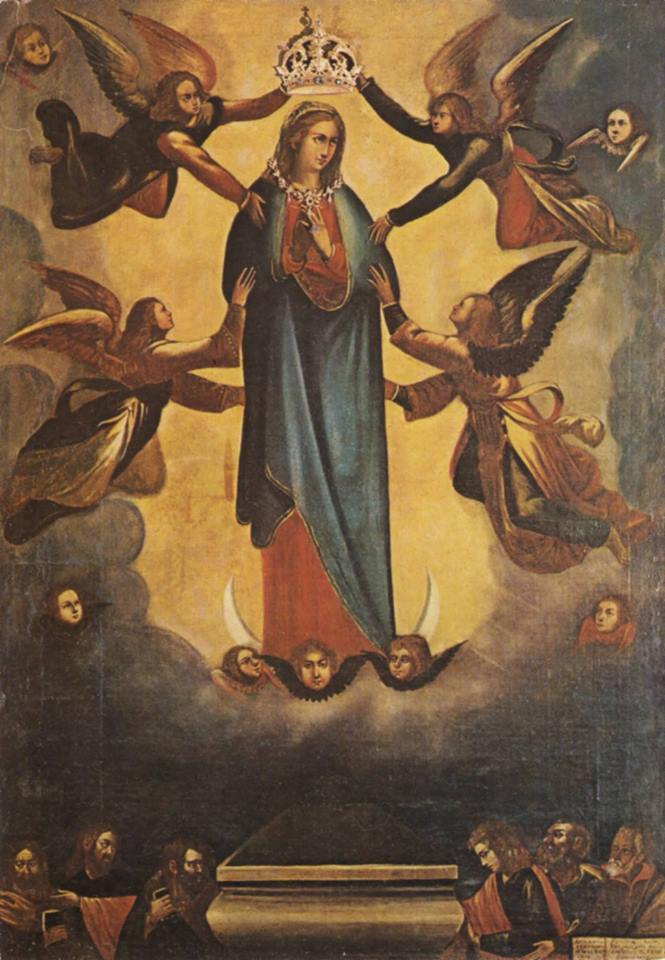
The painting attributed to Amadeo Perugino of the Assumption of the Virgin Mary, known more as il-Madonna ta' Pinu

The Blessed Virgin of Ta' Pinu, or as it is known in Maltese, "Il-Madonna ta' Pinu" is a religious devotion which originated on Gozo, the sister island of Malta. The many Maltese and Gozitans living abroad have managed to spread this devotion in many other parts of the world. The Ta' Pinu Basilica, is based in Għarb.

Pope Pius XI granted a formal decree of coronation for her on 24 May 1935, signed notarized by Cardinal Alexis Lepicier. The coronation took place on 20 June 1935.

== Origins ==
The first record of the Shrine of Our Lady of Ta' Pinu is a mention in the archives of the Curia in Gozo, when the Bishop Domenico Cubelles paid a visit to the chapel, where it is noted that the chapel had just been rebuilt and that the property belonged to the noble family of "The Gentile". During a pastoral visit to the Maltese Islands in 1575, apostolic visitor Msgr. Pietro Dusina, found the chapel in poor repair and ordered it demolished. According to tradition, when the workman struck the first blow with a pick he broke his arm. This was taken as an omen that this chapel should be preserved.

In 1611, Pinu Gauci, procurator of the church donated funds to have it and restored. The altarpiece of the Assumption of Our Lady was done in 1619 by Amadeo Perugino. In 1858 the church property changed hands and consequently its name, from "Of the Gentile" to "Ta` Pinu", that is "Of Joseph". Pinu is the Maltese diminutive of Guzeppi or Little Guzeppi, Guzeppinu.

The Shrine was dedicated as a minor basilica on 10 August 1932.

== Miracle ==
On 22 June 1883, a Gozitan peasant and worker in a field, Karmni Grima, apparently heard a female voice coming from the Chapel Pinu, that she was walking past. The voice was calling her in Maltese, and telling her "Ejja...ejja!" ("Come...come!") When she entered the chapel, the same voice told her to "recite three Hail Mary’s in honour of the three days that my body rested in the tomb." Grima kept this event a secret for two years. When she finally told a friend, Francesco Portelli. His response was to say that he too had heard a woman's voice at about the same time as Grima had. The voice had told him to honor the "Wound of Christ", which Christ had received while carrying the cross. Shortly after this conversation, Grima's mother was miraculously healed after invoking the "Madonna ta' Pinu".

From 1887 onwards, many pilgrimages were organized to this chapel, and the need for a new, much larger church arose. On 30 May 1920, the foundation stone of the new church was laid. The church was finally consecrated on 13 December 1931, and from that day onwards, the numerous people visiting the church did not cease.

== Veneration ==
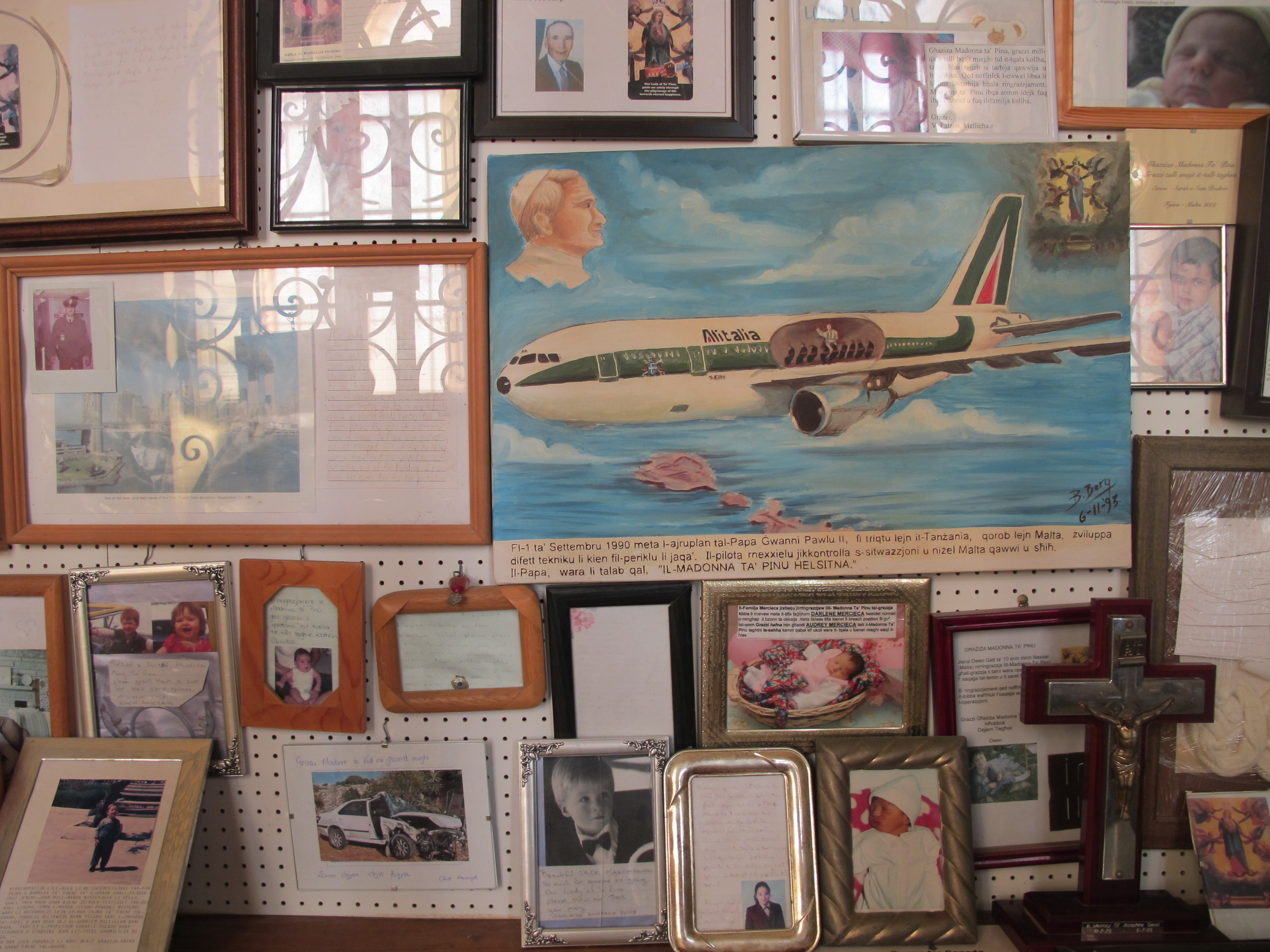
Ex-votos at Ta' Pinu

Ta’ Pinu Sanctuary holds an annual ceremony of the presentation of babies to Our Lady of Ta’ Pinu, during which baptised babies are presented to The Blessed Mother of Ta’ Pinu, while the parents pray to the Mother of God that she may keep her maternal protection over their children and families.

The Virgin of Ta' Pinu has often been connected to several miraculous healings of both Maltese and foreigners, who claim to have been saved, healed or helped through the intercession of the Virgin. The sanctuary is adorned with many ex-votos which have been given to this sanctuary by those who have either been healed, saved or received favours through the intercession of Our Lady Of Ta' Pinu. Today, these can still be seen by the many people who every day visit the basilica.

== Papal visits ==
On 26 May 1990 Pope John Paul II celebrated Mass at the basilica during his pastoral visit to Malta.

On 18 April 2010, when visiting Malta, Pope Benedict XVI donated and placed a Golden Rose in front of the devotional image of Our Lady Of Ta' Pinu which was brought over from Gozo to Malta for this special occasion. The Pope invited everybody to "Pray to her under the title queen of the family."

In April 2022, Pope Francis visited the shrine of Ta Pinu when he made a visit to the Maltese Islands.

== Expansion of Our Lady Of Ta'Pinu ==
The word of Our Lady Of Ta' Pinu has spread to wherever there was a Maltese diaspora. Since thousands of the Maltese and Gozitans emigrated to the United States and to Australia, in these countries the Maltese have even erected shrines dedicated to the Virgin Mary of Ta' Pinu. This was done to remind the Maltese and Gozitans about their roots and their religious traditions. Many of these Maltese emigrants, when revisiting their homeland, visit Ta' Pinu, to thank the Virgin Mary for their safe trip. Frenc Tal-Gharb had a great devotion towards Our Lady Of Ta' Pinu.

Many families visit the sanctuary to pray for Our Lady's intercession before leaving to accompany their relatives for medical treatment in England. A blessed copy of the painting of Our Lady of Ta’ Pinu was given to volunteers of "Fondazzjoni Puttinu Cares", in Sutton, England, to encourage the cancer patients not to lose heart and feel the Virgin Mary's protection during difficult times.

There is a Ta'Pinu Marian Shrine in Victoria, Australia.
