= Saint Faustinus =

Saint Faustinus may refer to:

- 2nd-century martyr (see Faustinus and Jovita)
- Faustinus of Brescia, 4th century
- Simplicius, Faustinus and Beatrix, 4th century
