= Our Lady of Angels =

Croatian monastery

Coordinates: 42°58′41″N 17°09′14″E

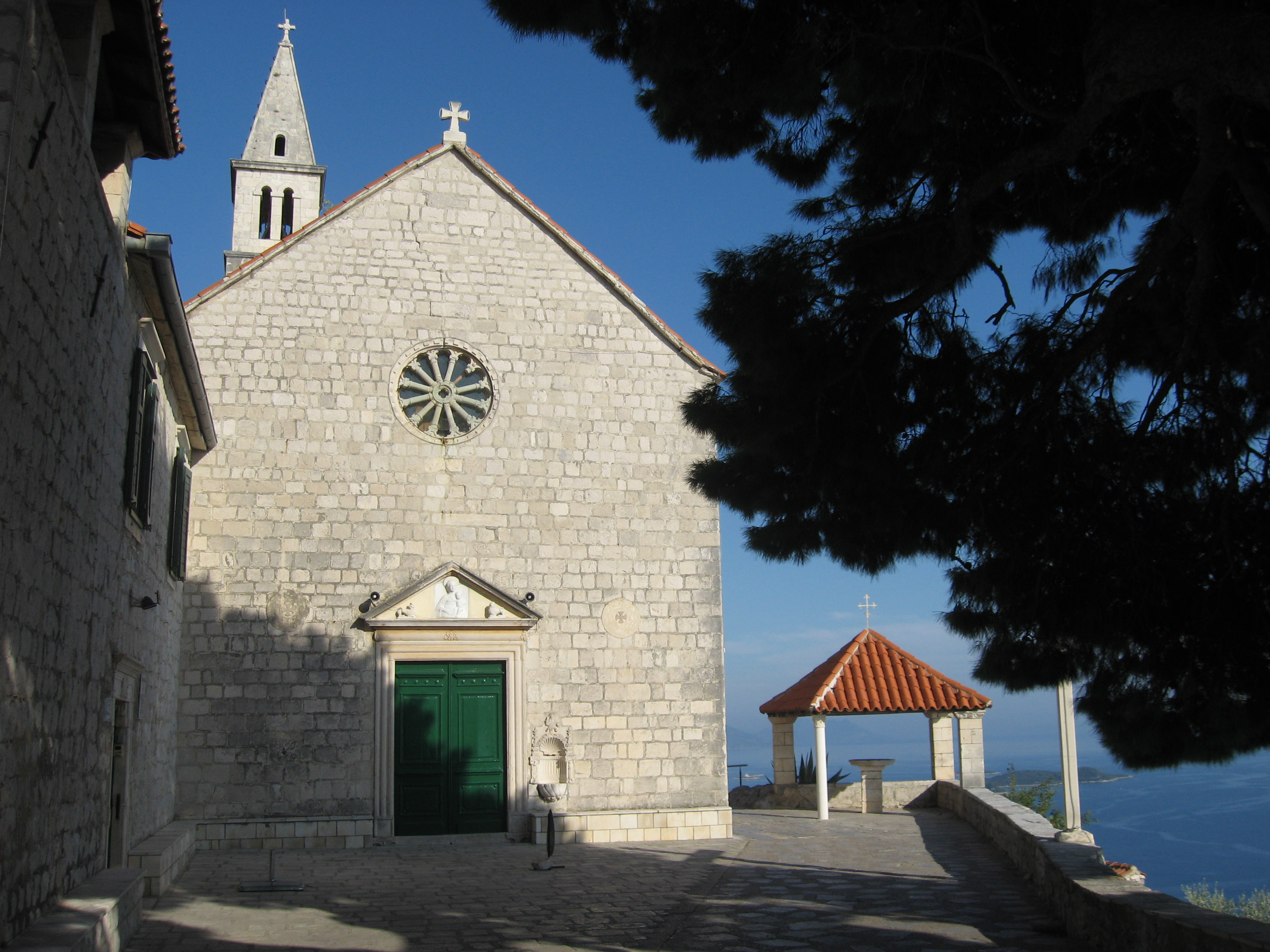

Our Lady of the Angel (Croatian: Gospa od Anđela) is a monastery near Orebić, a town on the Pelješac peninsula, in the Dubrovnik-Neretva County, Croatia.

The monastery was built at the end of the 15th century under the Republic of Ragusa (Dubrovnik), to which the town of Orebić belonged between 1333 and 1806. The Franciscans built it and are of a Gothic-Renaissance style.

The monastery is surrounded by dense pinewood forests and is located on a craggy stone crest 152 metres above the sea. It has a bird's-eye view east, south, and west over the Korčula and Pelješac sea channel with the old town of Korčula in the background. The building consists of one large floor with four outer wings. The whole building forms a unit with the church and is dominated by the bell tower. Petar Tolstoj, a Russian lord and travel writer, mentioned the monastery in 1868. German prince Philipp of Coburg stayed at the monastery in 1905, and the British writer Seaton Watson was there in 1913.

Seamen passing under the monastery traditionally greeted it with three calls on their ship sirens, and then the Franciscans answered with their church bells, producing a brilliant sound. The sound of the church bells could be heard throughout the sea channel.

== See also ==
- Croatia
- Pelješac
- Dalmatia
- Republic of Ragusa
