= Ġużepp Portelli =

Maltese Roman Catholic prelate (1880–1949)

The Reverend Monsignor Ġużepp Portelli
- Rector of the Basilica of Our Lady of Ta' Pinu
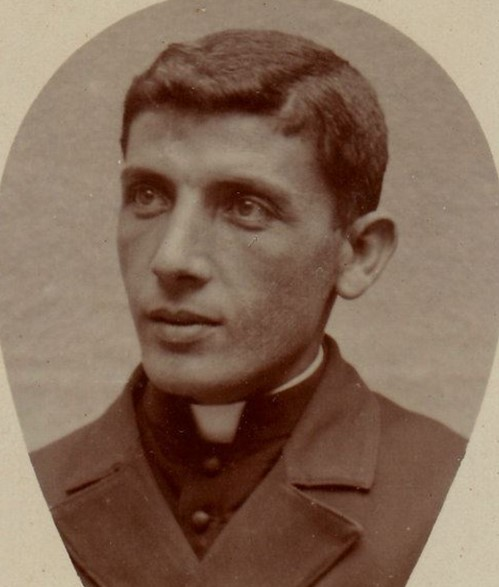
- Portelli at the time of his ordination in 1907
- Church: Roman Catholic
- Diocese: Diocese of Gozo
- Term ended: 7 March 1949

Orders
- Ordination: 21 December 1907 by Giovanni Maria Camilleri
- Rank: Monsignor

Personal details
- Born: 8 December 1880 Għarb, Gozo, Malta
- Died: 7 March 1949 (aged 68)
- Buried: Ta' Pinu Basilica
- Parents: Luiġi Portelli; Marianna Cauchi
- Occupation: Rector of Ta' Pinu Basilica
- Profession: Priest

Ġużepp Portelli (8 December 1880 – 7 March 1949) was a Maltese Roman Catholic prelate who founded the present Ta' Pinu Basilica in Gozo.

== Early life and family ==
Ġużepp (Joseph) Portelli was born in Għarb on 8 December 1880 to Luiġi Portelli and Marianna Cauchi. He was baptised the same day, at the Parish Church of Għarb. His godparents were Ġużeppi and Carmela Grima, the latter one is said to have heard the voice of Our Lady in the small chapel of Ta’ Pinu, the same church Ġużeppi helped build and became rector later on in life. Ġużeppi had 8 other siblings, 3 sisters and 5 brothers. Four of his brothers, Pio, Grazio, Salv and Karm, became priests while the other brother, Mikiel married. The sisters, Tereżina, Ġużeppa and Rosalina, never married.

== Priesthood ==
Ġużepp studied in the Gozo Major Seminary under the Jesuits. He was admired for his brilliant mind and for his prudence and profound spirituality. He was ordained by the Bishop of Gozo Giovanni Maria Camilleri in the Gozo Cathedral on 21 December 1907. As a young priest, Reverend Portelli exercised his pastoral ministry in the village of San Lawrenz, where his eldest brother, Monsignor Salv Portelli, served as parish priest.

When the Jesuits left the Gozo Seminary with a view to open a similar college in Malta, Reverend Portelli, who had become a lecturer at the Seminary, was called by Bishop Camilleri to become one of the new superiors of the Seminary and was made Vice Rector. Other superiors were Reverend Alfons Hili, who was the Rector, and Reverend Joseph Farrugia, who was the Prefect of Studies. Reverend Portelli was also made a Monsignor of the cathedral chapter.

Monsignor Portelli was also a renowned preacher who was often invited to deliver sermons and spiritual exercises in several churches in Malta and Gozo. Once, during Lent, was asked to preach to the Maltese Community of Tripoli. Monsignor Portelli was also confessor of the Franciscan and Dominican Sisters of Victoria.

Every Saturday evening, Monsignor Portelli used to go to Ta 'Pinu to celebrate mass. During this time his brother, Monsignor Karm Portelli was Archpriest of the Collegiate church of Gharb. Monsignor Portelli served as administrator of Ghasri, Nadur, Qala and Ta 'Sannat when the post of parish priest became vacant.

In 1933, several centres of Catholic Action started to emerge in Gozo and Monsignor Portelli became the Spiritual Director of the branch of Għarb. Here he used to give religious lessons and organized retreats for its members.

Apart from his pastoral duties he also wrote a number of theatrical plays and even music notes. Portelli became rector of the chapel of Ta’ Pinu and he is still remembered as the person who commissioned the building of the new church of Ta’ Pinu on 30 May 1922. The church was completed in 1932 and consecrated on August 31 of the same year in the presence of Monsignor Portelli. Monsignor Portelli died on March 7, 1949, after a brief illness. He was buried in Għarb Cemetery. On June 16, 2008, the remains of Monsignor Portelli were reburied inside the Basilica of Ta' Pinu.
