= Frenċ tal-Għarb =

Maltese faith healer (1892–1967)

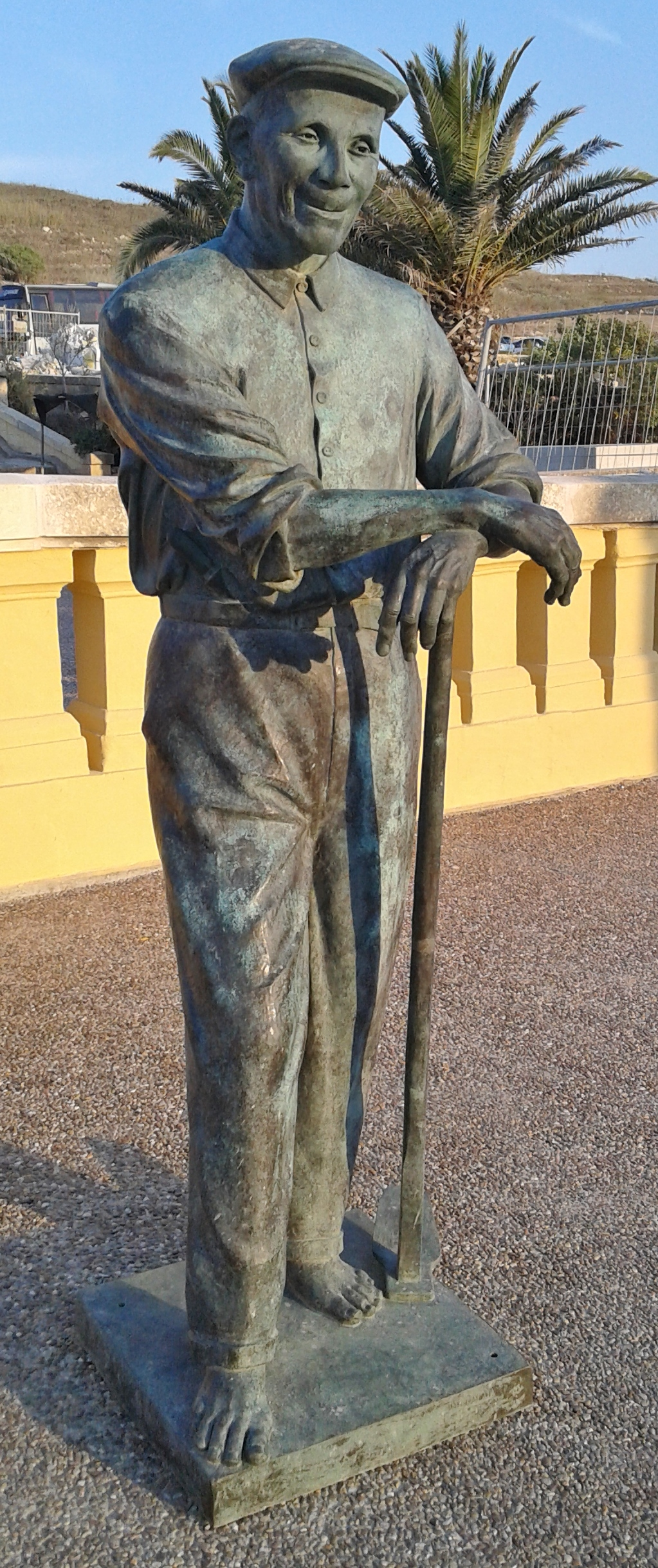
- Statue of Frenċ tal-Għarb outside Ta' Pinu Church
- Born: Franġisku Saverju Mercieca; 3 December 1892; Għarb, Gozo, Crown Colony of Malta
- Died: 19 May 1967 (aged 74); Għarb, Gozo, State of Malta
- Other name: Franġisku Saverju Mercieca
- Occupations: Farmer, healer

Francis Xavier Mercieca (Maltese: Franġisku Saverju Mercieca, né Franġisku Saverju Mercieca; 3 December 1892 – 19 May 1967), more commonly known as Frenċ tal-Għarb, was a farmer and healer from the village of Għarb, Gozo, Malta. He was a service apostle of Our Lady of Ta' Pinu.

== Early life ==
Frenċ tal-Għarb was born on 3 December 1892. He was one of twelve children born to Salvu Mercieca and his wife, Angelica. Like most other families in Gozo, Mercieca's family had also a nickname; they were known as "Tas-Sajf", literally meaning "Of Summer". From an early age Frenċ had to work in the fields of his family. His primary education came to a halt at the age of twelve years because "his father required his services in the fields from dusk till dawn." In 1917, his father died at the age of 75. Some members of Frenċ's family emigrated, while others got married.

Frenċ was influenced by the kind-hearted and pious character of his mother. During the years of World War I (1914–1918), she would often share her crops with other villagers, thus alleviating the problems of famine in other families. The kind-heartedness of Frenċ's family is also shown by the fact that they accommodated in their household two priests: Rev. Canon Paul Custo and Rev. Nazju Axiak. The latter lived with the family from 1920 until his death in 1947.

== Adulthood ==
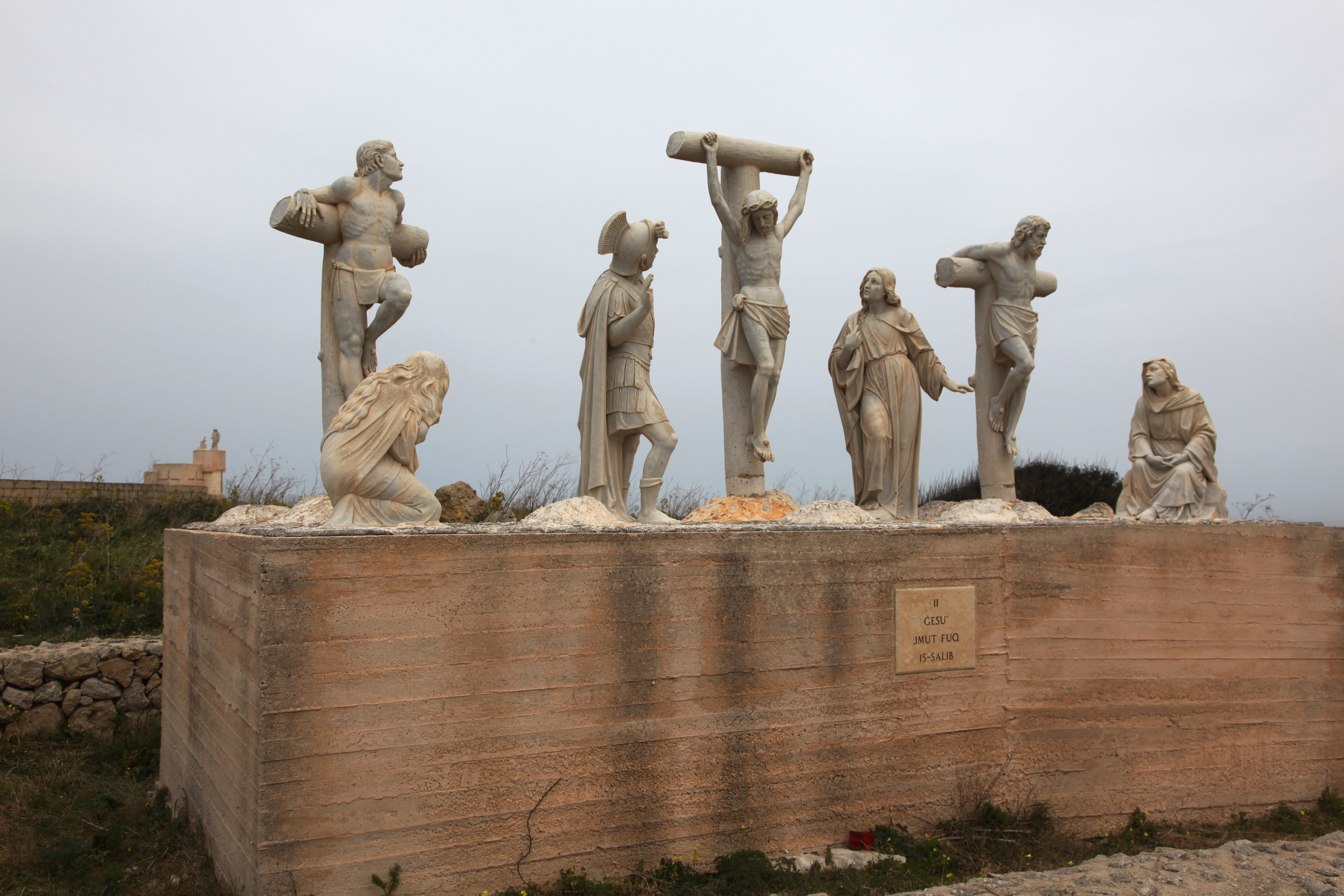
One of the fourteen stations of 'The way of the cross' on the Ta' Għammar hill

Frenċ, who remained a bachelor throughout his life, was an active member of the Catholic Action movement which had a presence in his village. He had a great devotion towards the Blessed Virgin Of Ta' Pinu and towards the Holy Eucharist. He used to take part in village theatrical productions, better known as “teatrin”. His part, very often, was that of a clown. People used to flock to the village hall to watch Frenċ.

Frenċ spent most of his life working in the fields. When he returned home, he used to find a lot of people, coming all walks of life, waiting for him. They would seek his counsel and were eager to listen to his advice and to elicit from him prayers for their needs. He combined his old knowledge in old medicinal herbs, his prayers and his faith in Our Lady for his cures, and his reputation spread rapidly throughout the entire Maltese Islands and even abroad.

Very often he would anticipate the questions that people were going to pose to him. He even disclosed to some of his visitors incidents from their own past, especially their past wrongdoings. A reprimand and a call for repentance would normally follow, often followed by a short prayer in rhyme. In some cases he even is said to have foretold the future.

== Frenċ in Court ==
Frenċ, who never studied medicine and never worked in a medical environment, was considered by many inhabitants of the Maltese Islands as a healer of body and soul. On 6 August 1966, Frenċ was interviewed by the late Charles Arrigo on Malta's cable radio system which was then run by Rediffusion. In this interview Frenċ stated, that certain members of the medical profession were skeptical of what he was doing. He was even taken to court where, on 11 June 1938, he was charged with unauthorized medical practice. Although found guilty, he was not fined anything, due to his clean conduct. This incident did not stop the public from continuing to visit Frenċ, who under constant police surveillance refused to accept any visitors.

=== A Loophole ===
Someone informed Frenċ about a loophole in the law: he could see people who were accompanied by a medical certificate, indicating, amongst other things, what treatment was required from him; e.g. massage of the feet. Eventually the medical profession and the law decided to let Frenċ continue with his practice, even without the need of a medical certificate. He never accepted any money from his visitors; all donations were passed over to Ta' Pinu Sanctuary.

== Frenċ and George Preca ==
Although Frenċ was never keen to cross the channel to Malta, whenever he did so, he was always inundated with several requests to visit the homes of sick people. Frenċ always did his utmost to accommodate such requests.

Frenċ had deep respect for George Preca. They knew each other. On one occasion, when Frenċ went on one of his trips to Malta, we have an account by Frenċ's sister, Filippina, of an encounter with Preca. Preca requested Frenċ to accompany him for some visits to sick people. Filippina recounts how Frenċ and Preca went on these visits walking along the streets hand in hand.

One of his last wishes was that a small hill in front of the church be adorned with statues denoting the fourteen stations of the cross. This wish was fulfilled and today both the church and the stations are visited by thousands of pilgrims each year.

Frenċ died on 19 May 1967 in the same house that he was born in.

People today still go to the village of Għarb and visit the house where Frenċ lived. His house has been converted into a historical and folklore Museum.

== Monument to Frenċ tal-Għarb ==
On August 29 of 2003, the late President Guido de Marco unveiled a monument to Frenċ tal-Għarb. A number of poems were read by Jonathan Mintoff, Noel Fabri and Lorna Cassar, together with musical pieces by the Mosta Scout Group, a talk on Frenċ's life by historian Rev. Dr Joseph Bezzina and some testimonial to a cure through the intercession of Frenċ tal-Għarb. The life-size monument, by the Gozitan sculptor Alfred Camilleri Cauchi, was cast in bronze at the Bonvicini brothers' foundry in Verona, Italy. The monument was blessed by the local archpriest, Mgr Carmelo Gauci. Għarb mayor David Apap, Fr Bezzina and former President de Marco made speeches for the occasion.
