= Karmni Grima =

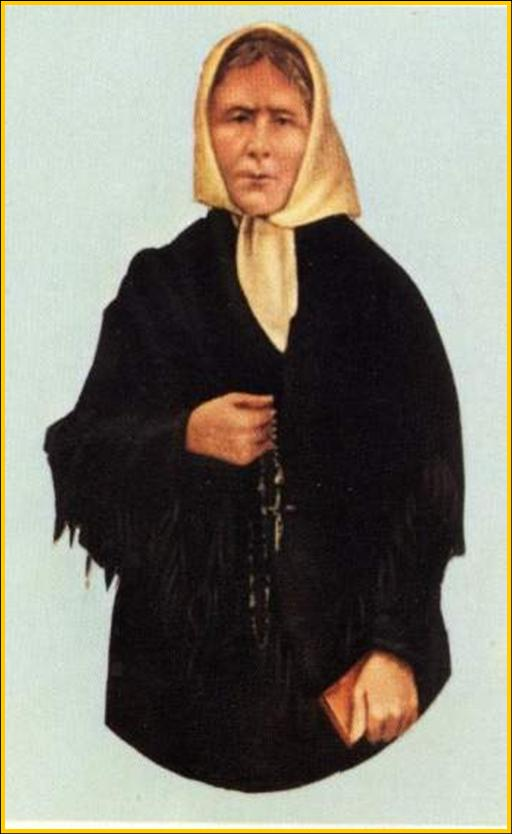
- Born: 2 February 1838; Għarb, Gozo, Malta
- Died: 25 May 1922 (aged 84); Gozo, Malta

Karmni Grima (2 February 1838 – 25 May 1922) was a Maltese peasant whose mystical religious experience led to the constructions and services as an apostle of Our Lady of Ta' Pinu.

== Biography ==
Karmni Grima was born in the village of Għarb in Gozo, the sister island of Malta. Her parents, Thomas and Antonia (née Apap), were poor labourers who worked in the fields located on the nearby hills of Għammar. Every day, after hearing Mass in a small chapel dedicated to the Blessed Virgin Mary, Grima would go to work in the fields.

On the 22 June 1883, while passing in front of the small chapel, she heard a mysterious voice calling her: "Come, ... come today. For a whole year, you will not be able to return". This event is considered as "the most notable occurrence in the history of the diocese" of Gozo. Grima, although terrified, obeyed and entered into the chapel. From a painting of the Assumption of the Blessed Virgin Mary located in the chapel, Grima heard a voice saying: "Recite three Hail Marys in honour of the three days that I stayed within the tomb." Grima got sick, and could only return to the chapel after a year.

Grima shared this experience with her confessor of sins and with her friend and neighbour Francesco Portelli. The latter told her that he also heard similar voices. Shortly after this mysterious incident, Francesco's mother was miraculously healed by the intercession of the Blessed Virgin Mary. Bishop Pietru Pace was informed about these events and, after speaking to Grima and Francesco, he concluded that the voice was of heavenly origins.

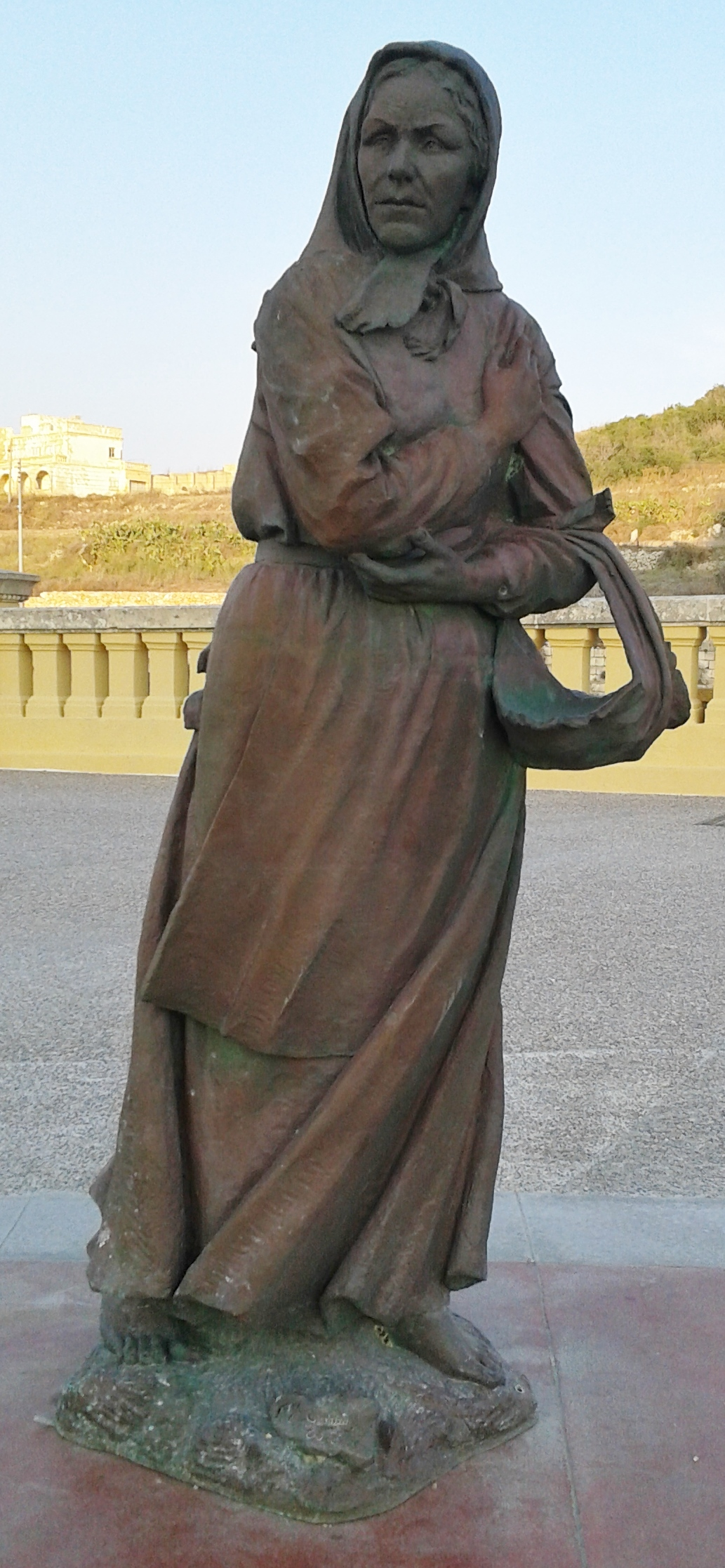
A statue of Karmni Grima outside Ta' Pinu Sanctuary in Gozo, Malta.

Within a short time the news spread throughout Malta and the small and abandoned chapel soon became a Marian shrine. Many people started to organize pilgrimages in honour of the Blessed Virgin Mary and ask for temporal and spiritual favours. This prompted the ecclesiastical authorities to build a sanctuary which would be able to accommodate the crowds that were now daily visiting the small chapel.

In 1920 the foundation stone of a modern basilica dedicated to the Blessed Virgin Mary under the title of Ta' Pinu was laid. Today the basilica of Ta' Pinu remains a very popular destination for Marian pilgrimages.

For the last 15 years of her life, Grima was bed-ridden.

Grima died on 25 May 1922.

The house where Karmni Grima lived still exists and it has now been turned into a museum.
