= Faustina and Liberata of Como =

Italian Roman Catholic saints

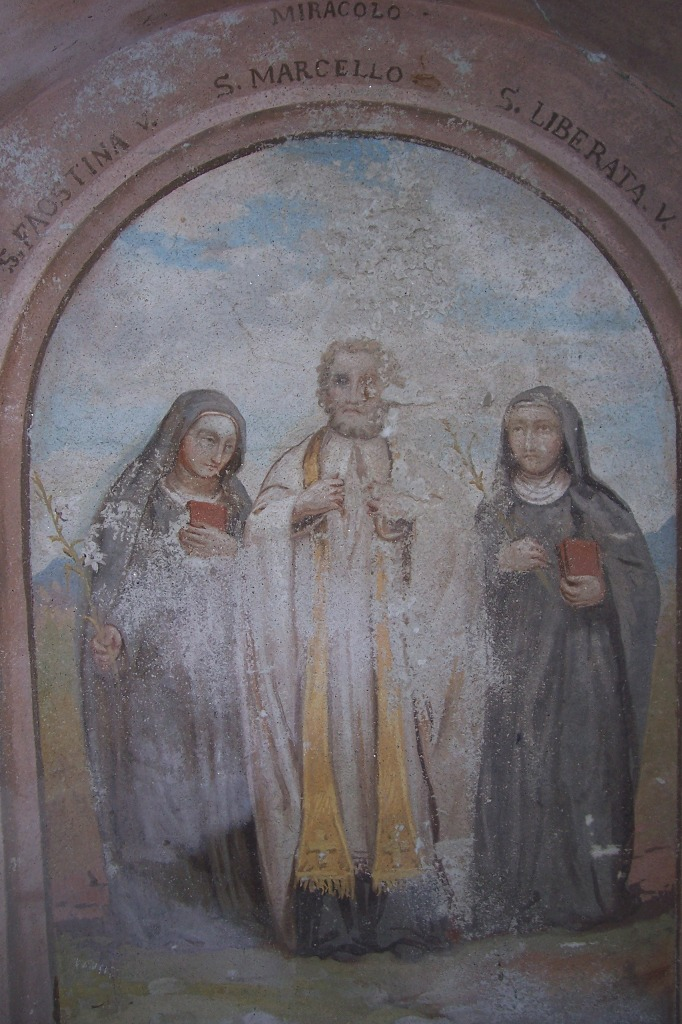
Liberata and Faustina of Como.

Liberata and Faustina of Como were sisters who lived as holy virgins in Como, Italy, during the 6th century. They founded the Convent of Santa Margarita in the town, and both died around 580 AD.

== Traditional account ==
Liberata and Faustina were the daughters of one Giovannato, who lived in the fortress of Olgisio in Pianello Val Tidone, in the province of Piacenza, where there are prehistoric caves known as the caves of the "Saints". Although promised in marriage, after a vision of a woman mourning the death of her husband, the sisters fled the castle and lived as hermits.

They later moved to Como and joined the Benedictines. According to Federico Troletti, the cult of Saint Faustina and Liberata is an isolated phenomenon in the Camonica Valley, where it is believed a flood was averted through their intercession.

Liberata and Faustina were invoked as patronesses of women in labour.

Their feast day is 18 January.
