= Il-Fosos =

Maltese underground grain silos

Coordinates: 35°54′N 14°31′E

The granaries of Malta, known locally as "Il-Fosos", are networks of subterranean storage chambers historically used to store large quantities of wheat. These structures, primarily located in Valletta, Floriana, Birgu, Senglea, Mdina and Gozo, were crucial in ensuring food security on the Maltese Islands from the medieval period through to the mid-20th century. The Maltese word "Fosos" is plural for "Foss", which in Maltese usually refers to a dry ditch or moat surrounding a fortification, for example, Il-Foss tal-Imdina (the moat surrounding Mdina).

The Maltese granaries resemble the subterranean grain pits of Il Piano delle Fosse del grano (or Piano San Rocco) in Cerignola, Italy.

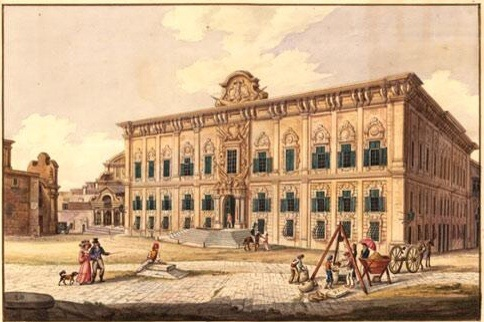
Charles Frederick de Brocktorff Watercolour of granaries in Castille Square in front of Auberge de Castille, Valletta

== Granaries in Main Gate Street, Birgu ==
The Knights of St John (later called the Knights of Malta) arrived in Malta in 1530, after Emperor Charles V granted them the islands as a fief. Grand Master Philippe Villiers de L’Isle Adam established the Order's first headquarters in Birgu, which quickly became the centre of military and administrative activity. Within this setting, the need for secure food storage was a pressing concern, particularly the safekeeping of imported grain, Malta's staple supply.

In 1536, Grand Master Juan de Homedes reorganised the Università or Council of Jurors, dividing it into two municipalities: Mdina and Birgu. The Birgu Università, responsible for the provision of grain for the population of the area, immediately undertook the excavation of six interconnected rock-hewn granaries at 27, Triq il-Mina Kbira, adjacent to the Church of St George, subsequently demolished in the 17th century. Some 500 Rhodians, Catholics of the Byzantine Rite, used this chapel after following the Order to Malta, as remembered by a commemorative plaque. One granary remains visible, covered by a granite block incorporated into the pavement, while the others are concealed beneath the street. Undoubtedly, these silos were beneficial during the Great Siege of 1565.

== Granaries in front of St Elmo ==
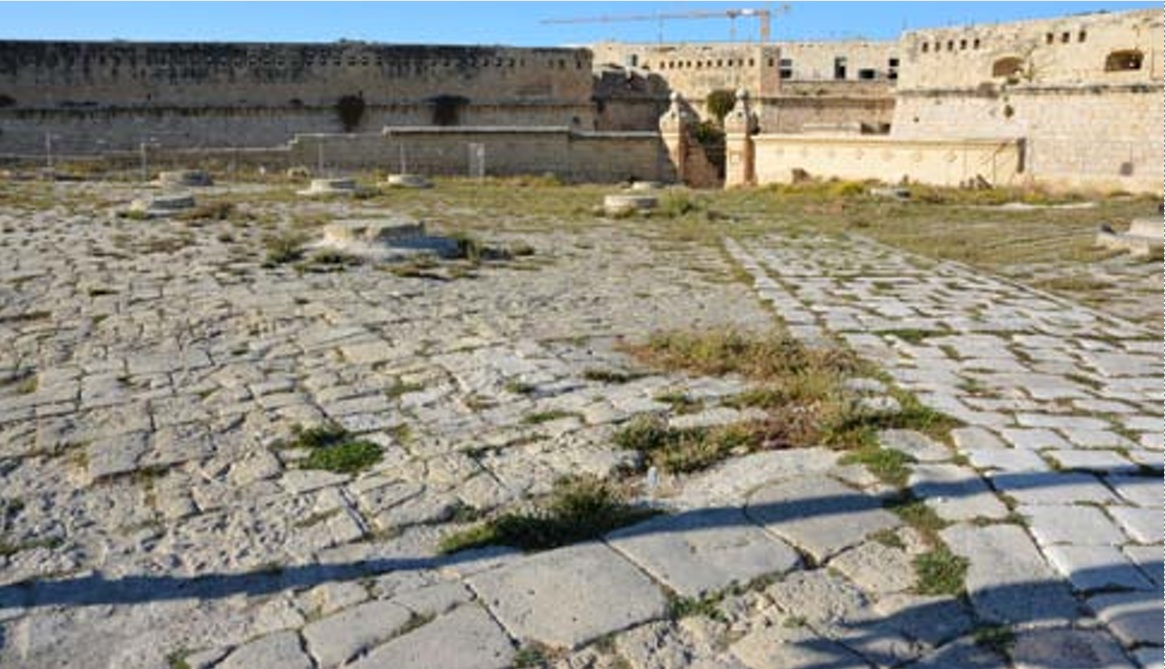
St Elmo Granaries

Following the Great Siege of Malta in 1565, the Knights of St. John started building a new, heavily fortified city on the other side of the Grand Harbour. Pope Pius V sent his own military engineer, Francesco Laparelli, who designed the city using a grid system to facilitate defence.

In 1658, the first granaries in Valletta were excavated near Fort St Elmo to serve as storage facilities for grain that was imported from Sicily. This was in the time of the Grand Master Fra Martin de Redin, who is mainly remembered for the thirteen coastal watchtowers he constructed along the Maltese coastline. Only 39 of the original 70 granaries are still visible, with the remainder having been destroyed to accommodate the road and adjacent building structures. The flask-shaped cavities were cut out of rock and came in different sizes, with a capacity ranging between 50 and 500 tonnes of grain. The smaller ones measured around 4.5 metres in diameter and about 9 metres in depth, featuring narrow cylindrical necks 1 to 2.5 metres in width.

The area surrounding the granaries was paved with hard stone to stop rainwater infiltration. At the bottom of each silo, compacted soil laid over the perforated floor acts as a drainage pit. Each reservoir is capped with large circular or square flat stones that would be sealed with pozzolana, a reddish-brown, cement-like material, to preserve dryness and prevent wheat spoilage and protect the food from pests.

In 2001, the granaries were scheduled as a Grade 1 monument, the highest degree of protection granted in Malta, indicating their outstanding architectural or historical interest. In 2013, the National Inventory of the Cultural Property of the Maltese Islands also classified the granaries as a monument of outstanding value.

== Granaries at Fort St. Angelo, Birgu ==
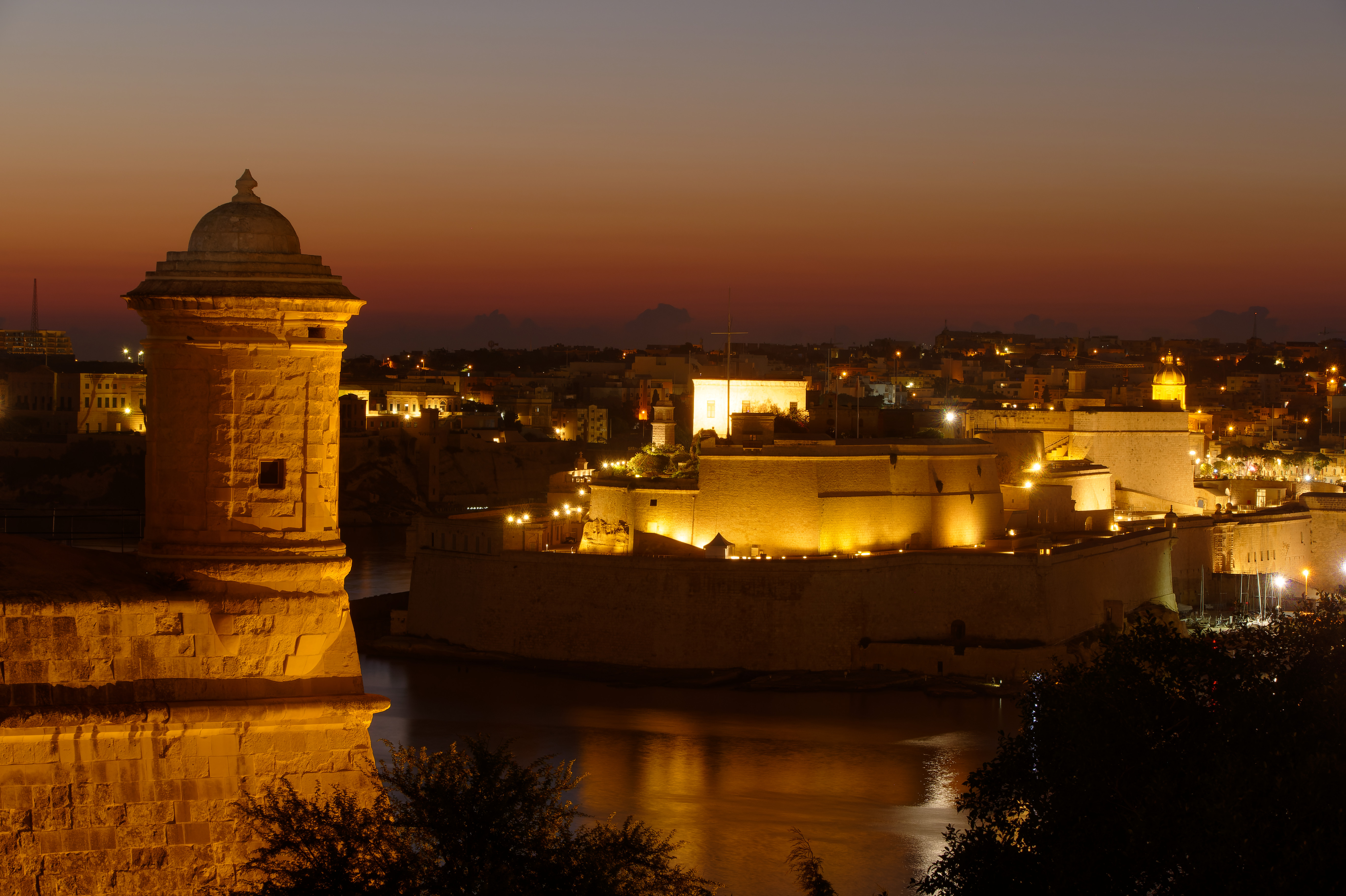
Fort St Angelo as seen from Valletta

In 1665, the Università excavated another four grain vaults between Fort St Angelo and Birgu, where the former Slaves’ Prison was located. Street names only started being used towards the end of the 18th century, so areas were only known by their nicknames, in this case "Fuq il-Fosos" ("On the pits") Over time, the area experienced significant transformations, and a Latin inscription commemorating the granaries and the names of the Jurats of the Università responsible for their construction was lost. However, it is recorded in Manuscript No. 327 at the National Library and translates to:

“During the rule of Grand Master Nicola Cotoner, these

granaries were constructed by the Jurats of the University of

Grains, John Lagnano, John Leonard Roselli, John Mary

Cardona and Oliver Pontis. The Year of our Lord 1665”

The Slaves' Prison had many subterranean cells to confine slaves for the night. Grand Master Pinto ordered the expansion of this jail following a rebellion by slaves in Malta in 1749. After an explosion of the Birgu Gunpowder Magazines in 1806, these prisons were repurposed into residences for displaced residents. After several years, it was discovered that around 400 homeless people were still residing there, but in 1842, they were forced to seek subsidised alternate housing, as the prison was required by the British Navy to be transformed into several workshops.

There were some additional grain silos next to a magazine within Fort St Angelo that were used only for emergencies. During the British colonial period, this magazine functioned as a forge for the Royal Engineers. Some granaries at Fort St Angelo and at Cittadella, Gozo were restored.

== Dar Annona ==
Dar Annona is a historic building situated at Castille Place, Valletta. In 1686, Grand Master Gregorio Caraffa built it to house the Università dei Grani and oversee the granaries located at St Elmo, Castille Place, and several other sites throughout Malta. Thus, Dar Annona served as an administrative centre for the importation of wheat and other vital goods, collectively known as annona. This organisation was instrumental in overseeing the island's grain supply and ensuring food security during the governance of the Knights of St. John. The term Annona originates from the Latin word meaning "annual harvest."

The edifice has a simple rectangular design, and its rear wall is integrated into the eastern side of St James Cavalier, one of the two keeps within Valletta's fortifications. Although constructed during the Baroque period, the façade of Dar Annona is remarkably austere and lacks the decorative elements typical of Baroque architecture. The primary façade is characterised by two unadorned pilasters at its ends and a simple fascia at the roofline. The central entrance is plain, and above it is a square stone frame that holds a commemorative plaque. The upper level features four windows, symmetrically arranged with two on either side of the central axis. Subsequent structural alterations include a window on the principal façade and a doorway on the lateral facade.

In 2008, Dar Annona was classified as a Grade 1 national monument by the Malta Environment and Planning Authority (MEPA) due to its historical and architectural importance through Government Notice No. 276/08 in the Government Gazette of 28 March. The building now houses the Valletta Post Office.

== Granaries in front of Auberge de Castille ==
The granaries in front of Auberge de Castille were asphalted over during the landscaping works. In 2007, the Grand Harbour Regeneration Corporation was tasked with rehabilitating Castille Place, during which some of the historic grain silos were discovered and recapped. Other Valletta granaries, in St George's Square, have regrettably been paved over like those of Mdina, in Howard Gardens, just outside the walled city.

== The Granaries (Pjazza San Publju – il-Fosos) ==
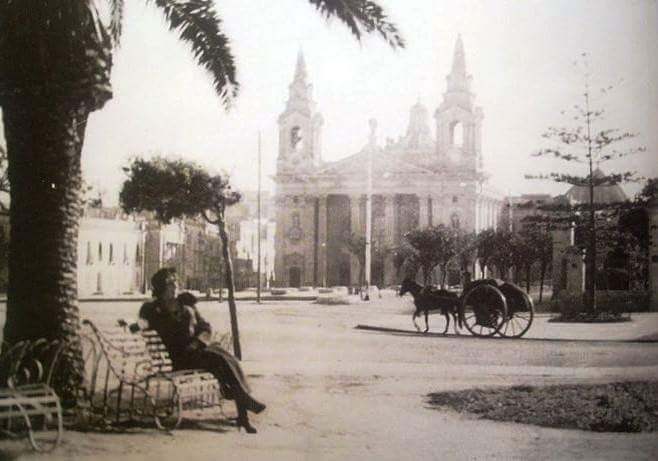
Il-Fosos in the 1920s

The Floriana Granaries are located just outside the bastions of the capital, Valletta, near St Publius parish church, and are a Grade I scheduled monument. The granaries are excavated pits covered with circular stone slabs. They are the largest concentration of granaries, totalling 76.

The first granaries were built by the Knights of Saint John to provide for storage within the fortifications in case of a siege. As a reliable and efficient storage system, the British authorities copied in all details the Knights’ granaries. The Floriana Granaries were commissioned between 1847 and 1851 by the Governor of Malta, Richard More O'Farrell and demonstrated their value as they continued to provide grain for the starving population during World War II.

The granaries square, known as "il-Fosos" in Maltese and originally as "il-Granarji", has been officially named Pjazza San Publiju. They can be found and is one of the largest urban open spaces in Malta, primarily used for large events, mass gatherings and festivals. The Granaries hosted a mass officiated by Pope John Paul II during his visit on 27 May 1990, and again on 9 May 2001, where he beatified three Maltese: Nazju Falzon – a Maltese cleric and a professed member of the Secular Franciscan Order; Maria Adeodata Pisani – a Maltese nun venerated for her heroic virtues; and Dun Ġorġ Preca – a Catholic priest and founder of the Society of Christian Doctrine, who was eventually proclaimed the second Maltese Catholic saint, following St. Publius. The beatification was a significant event in the history of the predominantly Catholic nation, was succeeded by a third Papal visit by Pope Benedict XVI on 18 April 2010 and a fourth Papal visit by Pope Francis on 3 April 2022. The Floriana Granaries often serve as venues for large open-air concerts and events, including the highly popular summer Isle of MTV.

In 2018, James Aaron Ellul initiated a campaign to safeguard the granaries, as no one appeared willing to assume responsibility for damages to the Granaries. Ellul asserted that the necessary maintenance to safeguard the Granaries is insufficient and that governmental authorities have failed to assume responsibility for the historical site, which has yet to undergo a damage assessment due to its continual usage as a venue for large gatherings.

== Granaries at the Citadel in Victoria, Gozo ==
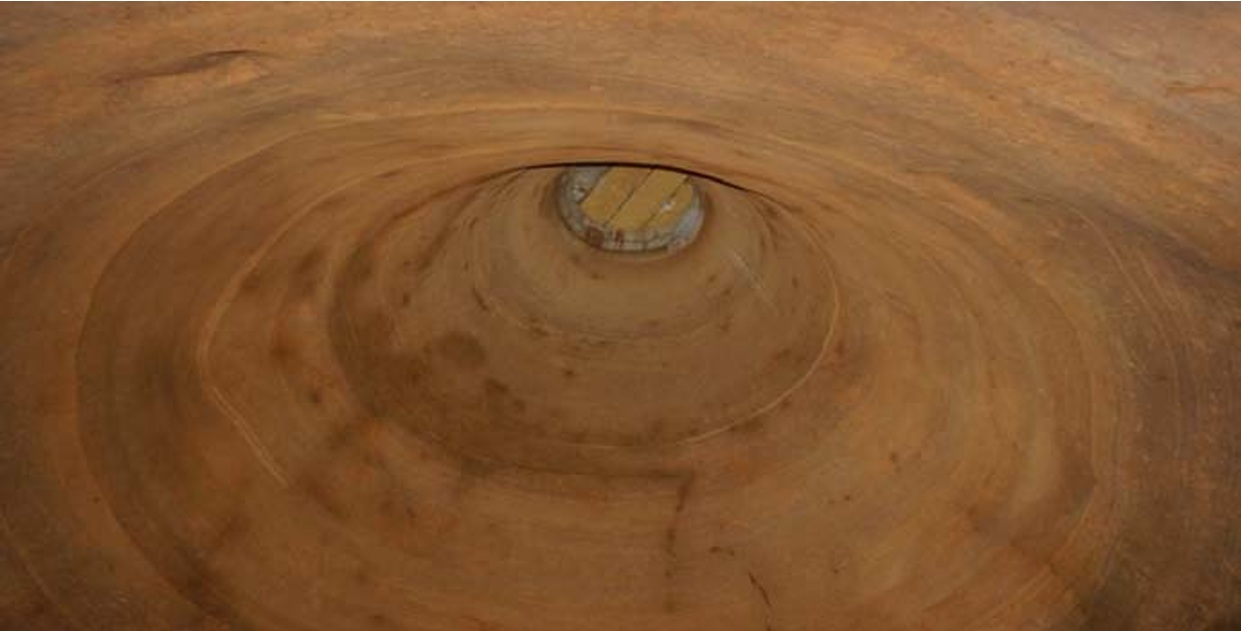
The interior of one of Cittadella fosos, viewed upward towards the opening. The walls lining was added during the conversion of the silos into water cisterns in 1877.

Three grain silos may also be found behind St John's Cavalier in the Citadel in Victoria, Gozo. The largest of the three is over 11 metres deep and around 3.6 metres at its widest point. Originating in the medieval period, the three grain silos were expanded as part of the early-seventeenth-century refurbishments of the fortifications. Thus, the Knights of St John ensured that the population of Gozo maintained sufficient grain reserves for emergencies, particularly when residents were compelled to seek refuge in the Cittadella during recurrent assaults by Moorish corsairs.

In 1877, the grain pits were linked by tunnels during the British Administration and repurposed as water storage cisterns to enhance the provision of clean water for the burgeoning population of Victoria. The complex was restored by Wirt Ghawdex in 2009 and opened to the public through the tunnel leading to St John's Battery, behind the Gunpowder Magazine (also known as Polverista), which are also maintained by Wirt Għawdex.
