= Floriana =

Floriana Il-Furjana/Floriana Borgo Vilhena
- Local council
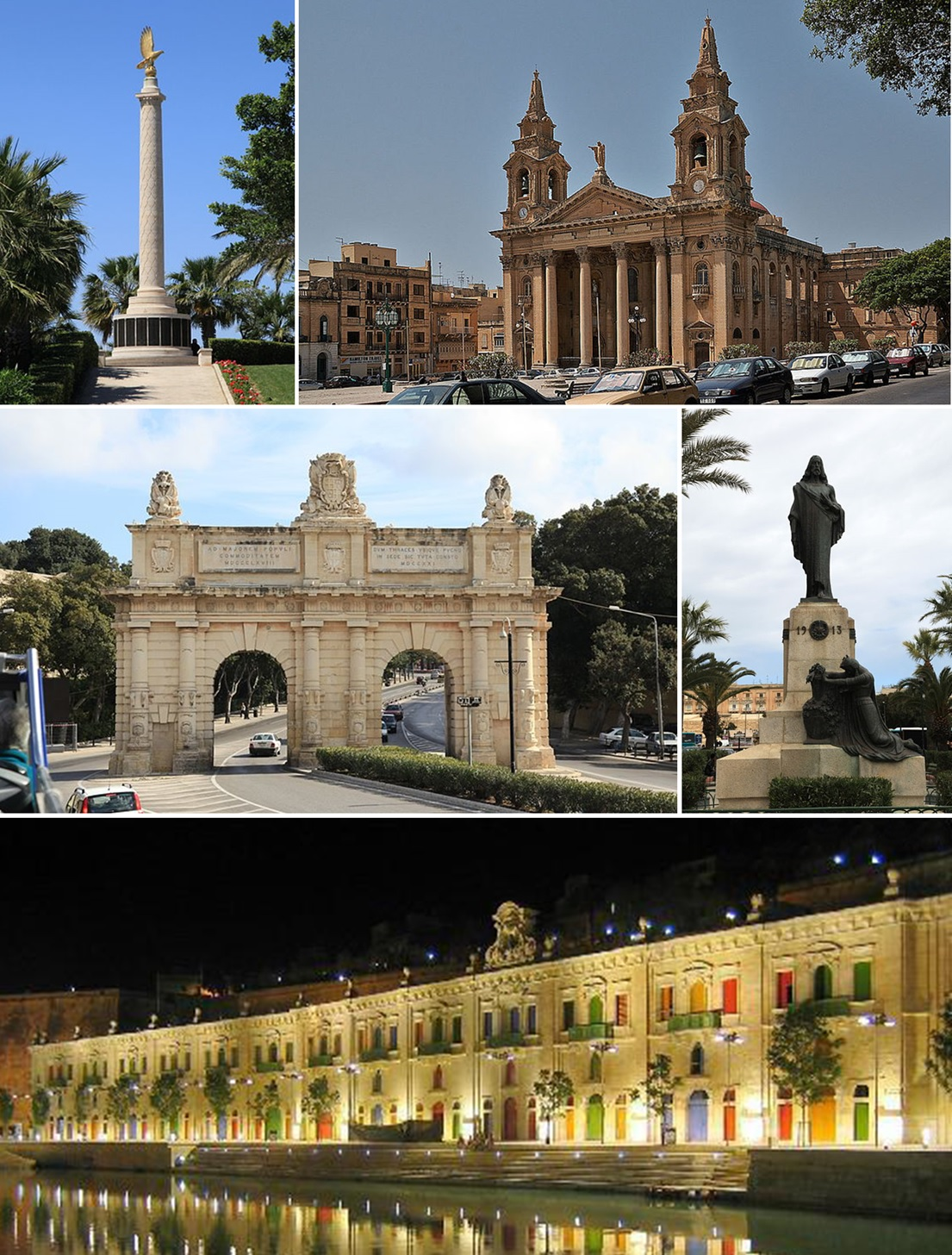
- From top: Malta Memorial, St Publius Parish Church, Porte des Bombes, Christ the King Monument, Valletta Waterfront

- Flag Coat of arms
- Etymology: Pietro Paolo Floriani
- Motto: Flores mulcent aurae educat imber
- Floriana in Malta
- Coordinates: 35°53′36″N 14°30′21″E
- Country: Malta
- Region: Port Region
- District: Southern Harbour District
- Established: 1724
- Founder: António Manoel de Vilhena
- Borders: Ħamrun, Marsa, Pietà, Valletta

Government
  - Mayor: Nigel Holland (FF)
  - Deputy Mayor: James Aaron Ellul (PN)

Area
  - Total: 0.94 km^{2} (0.36 sq mi)
- Elevation: 38 m (125 ft)

Population (Jul. 2024)
  - Total: 2,096
  - Density: 2,200/km^{2} (5,800/sq mi)
- Demonym(s): Furjaniż (m), Furjaniża (f), Furjaniżi (pl)
- Time zone: UTC+1 (CET)
  - Summer (DST): UTC+2 (CEST)
- Postal code: FRN
- Dialing code: 356
- ISO 3166 code: MT-09
- Patron saint: St. Publius
- Day of festa: 22 January
- Website: www.florianalocalcouncil.com

Floriana (Maltese: Il-Furjana or Il-Floriana), also known by its title Borgo Vilhena, is a fortified town in the Port Region area of Malta, just outside the capital city Valletta. It has a population of 2,205 as of March 2014. Floriana is the birthplace of many famous Maltese, amongst which the composer of the national anthem, 'L-Innu Malti', Robert Samut; former Bishop of Malta Dun Mauro Caruana, the poets Oliver Friggieri and Maria Grech Ganado, the writer and politician Herbert Ganado and Swedish Idol winner Kevin Borg.

== Etymology ==
Floriana is named after Pietro Paolo Floriani, an Italian military engineer who designed the Floriana Lines, the line of fortifications surrounding the town. In Maltese, the town is called Il-Floriana by the local council. However, it is popularly known as Il-Furjana, and the latter is regarded as the official name by the National Council for the Maltese Language. Government sources use both variants.

The town's original official name was Borgo Vilhena (or Subborgo Vilhena) after Grand Master António Manoel de Vilhena, but the name fell out of use in favour of Floriana or Furjana. The name Borgo Vilhena is now used as a title, just like Valletta has the title Città Umilissima.

== History ==
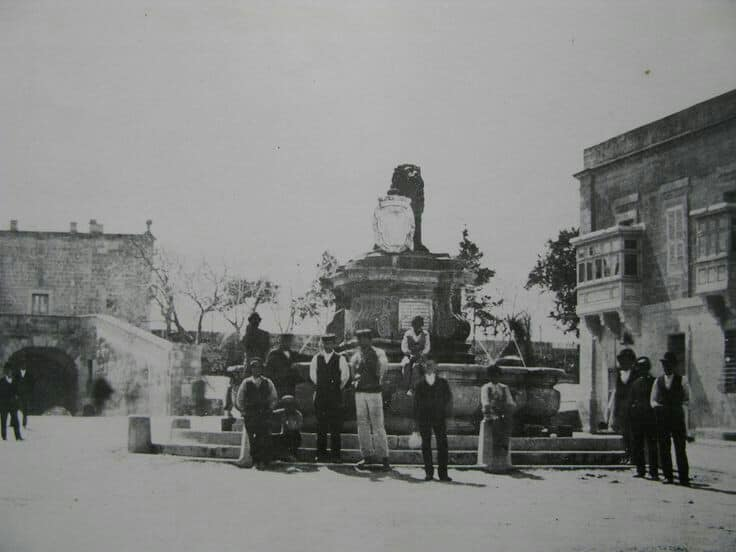
St.Anne Square in Floriana, ca. 1870

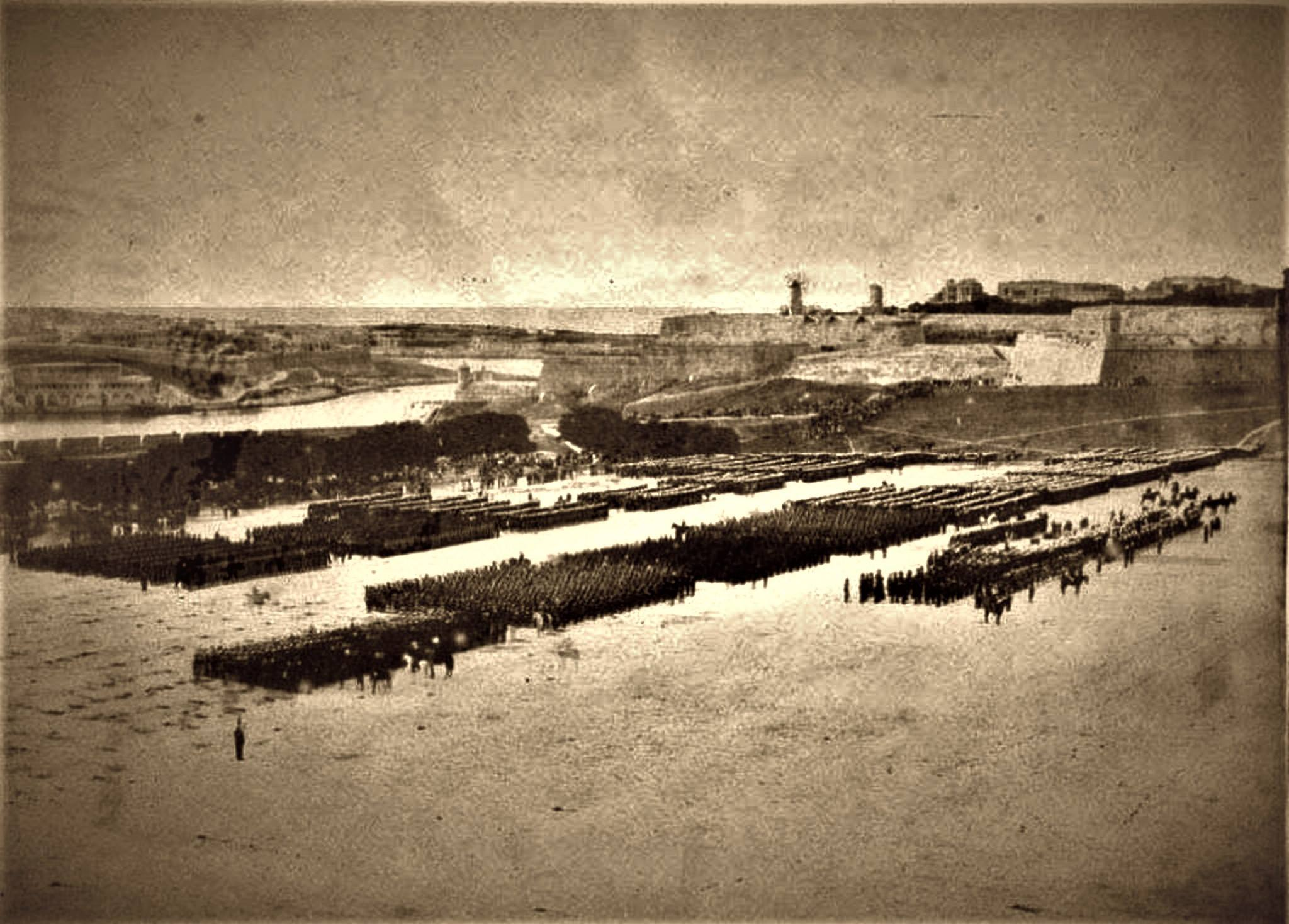
Floriana parade ground, June 1878

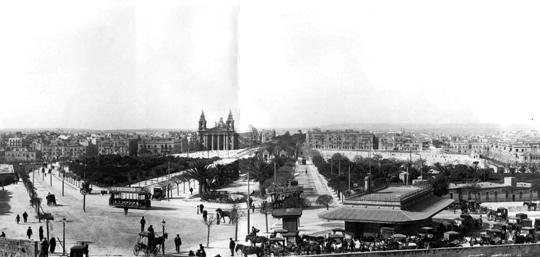
Panorama of Floriana by Richard Ellis, ca. 1900

The origins of Floriana go back to 1636, when construction of the Floriana Lines commenced. The line of fortifications was built outside the fortifications of Valletta as an outer defensive line for the capital city. The lines were named after Pietro Paolo Floriani, the Italian military engineer who had designed them. The fortifications were partially defensible by 1640, but construction and modifications continued throughout the 17th and 18th century, being fully completed in the 1720s.

The area between the Floriana Lines and the Valletta Land Front began to be built up in 1724, when Grand Master António Manoel de Vilhena founded the suburb Borgo Vilhena.

=== New suburb 1700–1800 ===
The new suburb, in 1746, consisted of twenty residential blocks, which were arranged on both sides of St. Anne's Street and also of the church of St. Publius which was to the north of the residential area. By the mid-eighteenth century the suburb had un- dergone some expansion, with Montgomery House built in 1730 as a country house for the Grandmaster of the time. Also during this time, under the orders of the Grandmaster, there were two Welfare Institutions built: one was the Ospizio (1732) and the other was the Conservatorio (1734). The Argotti gardens were also laid out (1741) and the trend of Religious buildings located in Floriana continued with the building of the Chapel of St. Calcedonius, dedicated in 1743, which became part of the new Seminary in 1751, (Tonna, 1979). Four new residential blocks were also laid out around the Seminary soon after.

At this time, the Knights were still in control of Malta and it was under their supervision that Floriana developed. The new gardens and buildings made Floriana a spacious and attractive suburb and a welcome contrast to the dense buildings and population of Valletta.

In 1806, 25 soldiers who had participated in the Froberg mutiny were executed at the Floriana parade ground.

=== In the time of the British ===
The British developed Floriana as a garrison town and during the nineteenth century they built several barracks within it and took over large buildings for military use. It was during this period that the Lintorn Barracks, Casemate Barracks and St. Francis Barracks were built. In this period, that is at around 1857, a school was built and there was also the development of port facilities along the wharfs on both sides of the peninsula.

In the early twentieth century, several gardens were laid out. These were the Rundle (1915), the Kalkara Gardens (1927), Luigi Preziosi (1930) and King George the Fifth. The playing fields and the hospital were also built.

== Demographics ==
The population of Floriana was 2,906 in July 2024. This included 1,103 males and 993 females; 1,584 Maltese nationals and 512 foreign nationals.

== Sports ==
The Assoċjazzjoni Sport Floriana, or Floriana Sports Association, sponsors a number of sports in the town, as well as hosting the Floriana Supporters Club. Sporting clubs include:

- Floriana Football Club which was the most successful football club in Malta of the 20th century
- Floriana Basketball Club

== Patron saint ==
Saint Publius is one of the patron saints of Malta and also the patron saint of Floriana. The Archipresbyteral Church of Floriana is dedicated to Saint Publius, traditionally acclaimed as the first Bishop of Malta.

Pope John Paul II spoke at St. Publius Square during his two visits to Malta, and on his second visit he held the beatification of three Maltese:

- Saint Ġorġ Preca (founder of the Society of Christian Doctrine)
- Nazju Falzon
- Maria Adeodata Pisani

== Main sights ==
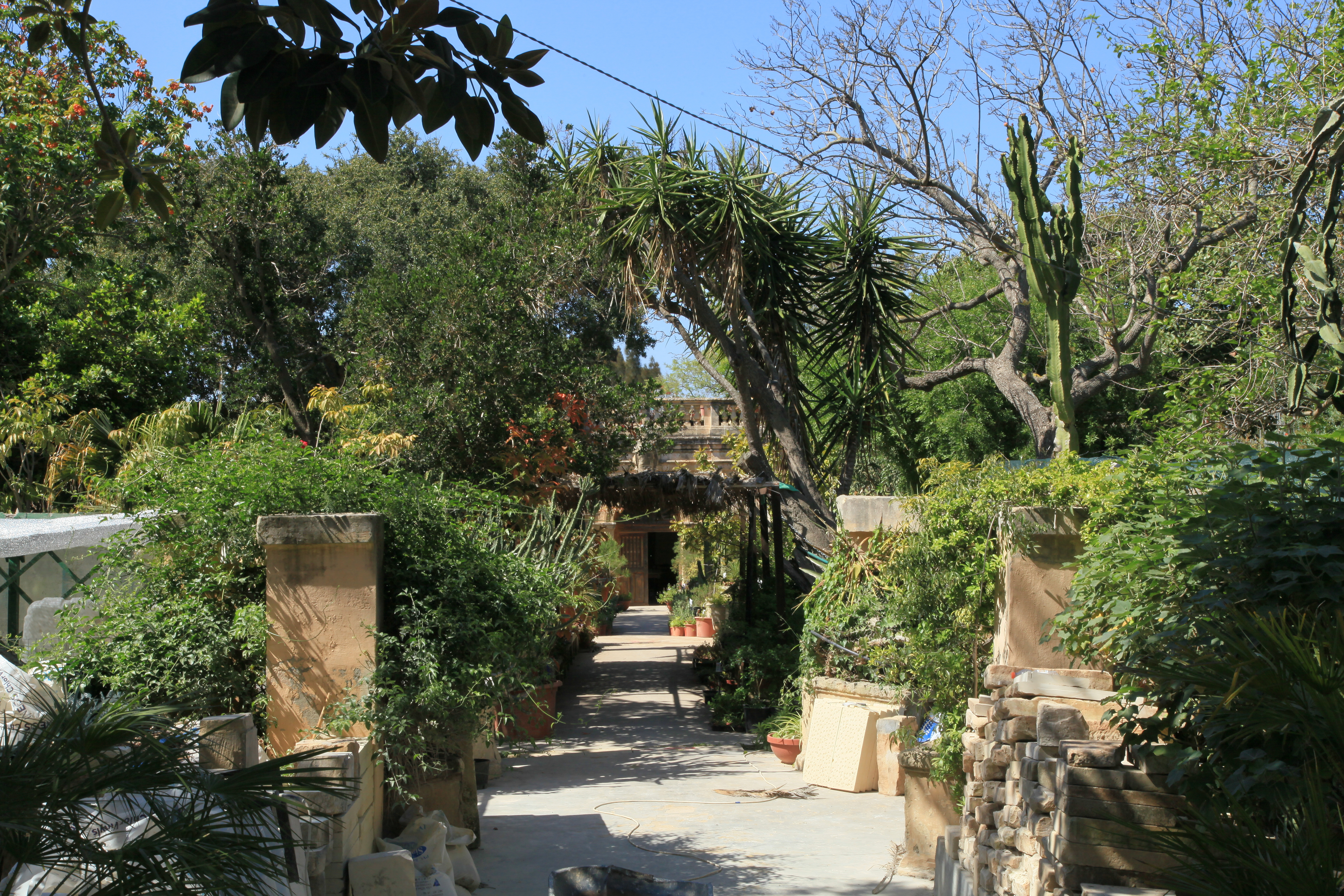
Argotti Botanic Gardens

- St Publius Parish Church
- St. Publius Square, including the Granaries
- The Mall Gardens
- The Floriana Lines, including Portes des Bombes
- Wignacourt Water Tower
- Sarria Church
- Robert Samut Hall
- The Valletta Waterfront, including the Church of the Flight into Egypt
- War Memorial
- Malta Memorial
- King George V Recreational Grounds
- Argotti Botanical Gardens
- Sir Luigi Preziosi Gardens
- Vilhena Gardens
- Polverista
- St. Philip's Garden
- Herbert Ganado Gardens
- Jubilee Grove (which demarcates the town from Ħamrun and Pietà)
- Msida Bastion Historic Garden, near Hay Wharf, another landmark which has been restored and reportedly contains the grave of Mikiel Anton Vassalli, an 18th-century writer and reformer who is much associated with Malta's national identity.
- Hydrofoil terminal, which is very busy during summertime with daily departures to Sicily.

=== Village Core ===
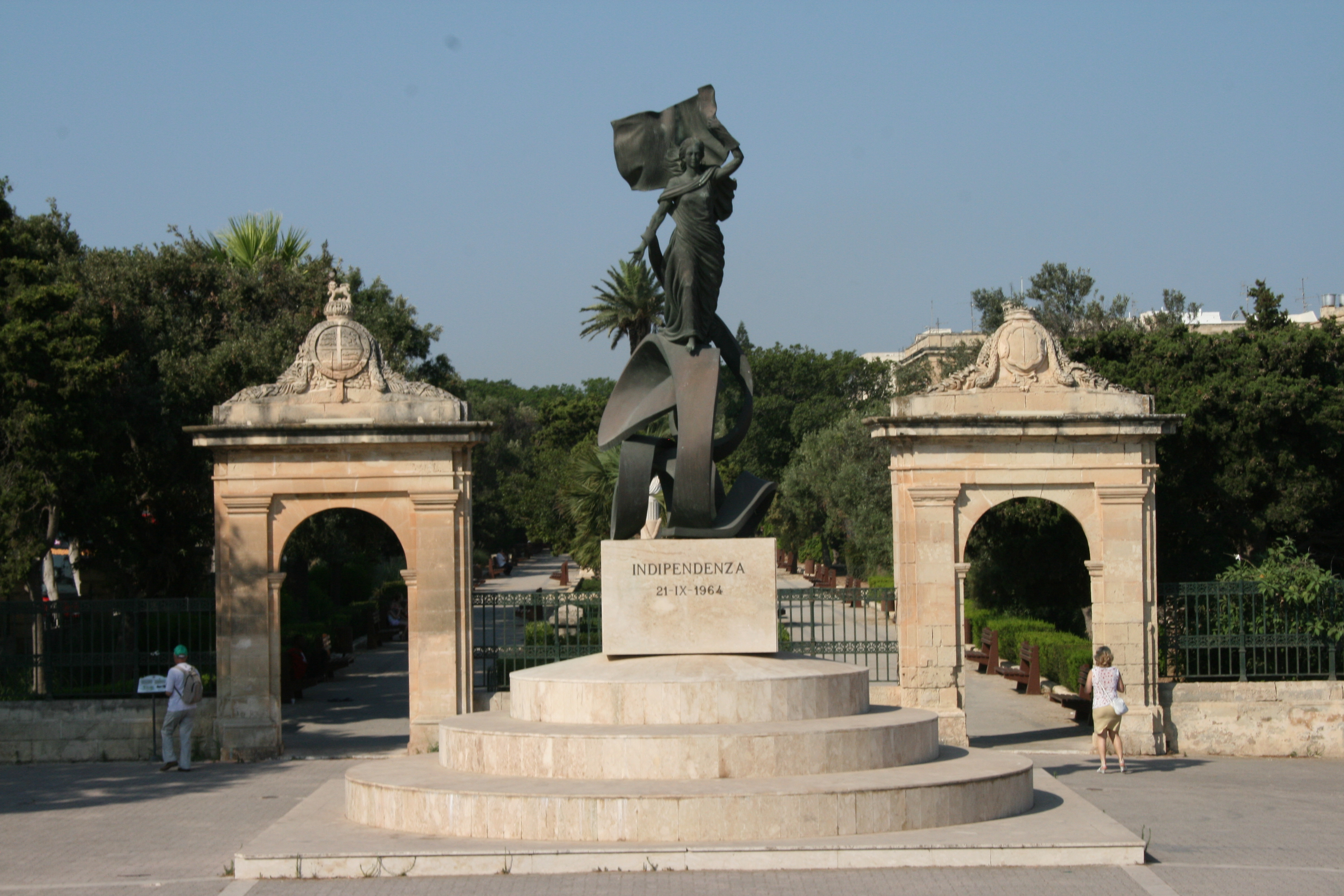
Independence Monument and entrance to the Mall Gardens

- Pjazza Emm. S. Tonna (E.S. Tonna Square)
- Pjazza San Kalċidonju (St. Calcidonio Square)
- Triq il-Konservatorju (Conservatory Street)
- Triq il-Mall (Maglio Street)
- Triq il-Miratur (Gunlayer Street)
- Triq is-Suq (Market Street)
- Triq l-Argotti (Argotti Street)
- Triq l-Iljun (Lion Street)
- Triq l-Isqof M. Caruana (Bishop M. Caruana Street)
- Triq San Publju (St. Publius Street)
- Triq San Tumas (St. Thomas Street)
- Triq Sarria (Sarria Street)
- Trejqet il-Fosos

== Government ==
Former flag of Floriana, in use 1993–2006

Former coat of arms of Floriana, in use 1993–2006

Floriana is a leading administrative centre, hosting the Ministry and Dept of Education, the Ministry for Resources and Rural Affairs, Police Headquarters and the Public Works Dept, The Licensing and Testing Office, and Land Transport Directorate of Transport Malta, as well as other financial and commercial companies spread around the former Colonial Administrative Area of Belt-is-Sebħ. The National Audit Office along with the Department of Contracts and the Malta Environment and Planning Authority, are located in two ravelins, Notre Dame and St. Francis, respectively.

The Floriana Local Council was established in 1993 along with Malta's other local councils to administer the town. It is located at Emmanuel S. Tonna Square.

== Festival ==
The annual Isle of MTV music festival has been held in Floriana since 2007.

Floriana is home to the Hotel Phoenicia and Hotel Excelsior, as well as other places to stay, including boutique hotels.

== Maltese Carnival ==
Floriana is the scene of the Maltese Carnival, held in St. Anne's Street in February leading up to Lent.

== Climate ==
Floriana features a Mediterranean climate with warm, dry summers and mild, wet winters. Floriana experiences a lack of precipitation during the summer months and heavier precipitation during the winter months. Winter temperatures are moderated by the city’s proximity to the sea. As a result, Floriana enjoys mild winters, however windy in some areas. The official climate recording station in Malta is at Luqa Airport, which is a few miles inland from Floriana. Average high temperatures range from around 16 °C (61 °F) in January to about 32 °C (90 °F) in August, while average low temperatures range from around 10 °C (50 °F) in January to 23 °C (73 °F) in August. The Köppen Climate Classification subtype for this climate is "Csa" (Mediterranean Climate).

Climate data for Luqa, Malta 1981-2010 (Records 1947-2010)
Month	Jan	Feb	Mar	Apr	May	Jun	Jul	Aug	Sep	Oct	Nov	Dec	Year
Record high °C (°F)	22.2 (72.0)	26.7 (80.1)	33.5 (92.3)	30.7 (87.3)	35.3 (95.5)	40.1 (104.2)	42.7 (108.9)	43.8 (110.8)	37.4 (99.3)	34.5 (94.1)	28.2 (82.8)	24.3 (75.7)	43.8 (110.8)
Mean daily maximum °C (°F)	15.6 (60.1)	15.6 (60.1)	17.3 (63.1)	19.8 (67.6)	24.1 (75.4)	28.6 (83.5)	31.5 (88.7)	31.8 (89.2)	28.5 (83.3)	25.0 (77.0)	20.7 (69.3)	17.1 (62.8)	23.0 (73.3)
Daily mean °C (°F)	12.8 (55.0)	12.5 (54.5)	13.9 (57.0)	16.1 (61.0)	19.8 (67.6)	23.9 (75.0)	26.6 (79.9)	27.2 (81.0)	24.7 (76.5)	21.5 (70.7)	17.7 (63.9)	14.4 (57.9)	19.3 (66.7)
Mean daily minimum °C (°F)	9.9 (49.8)	9.4 (48.9)	10.6 (51.1)	12.4 (54.3)	15.4 (59.7)	19.1 (66.4)	21.7 (71.1)	22.6 (72.7)	20.8 (69.4)	18.1 (64.6)	14.6 (58.3)	11.6 (52.9)	15.5 (59.9)
Record low °C (°F)	1.4 (34.5)	1.7 (35.1)	2.2 (36.0)	4.4 (39.9)	8.0 (46.4)	12.6 (54.7)	15.5 (59.9)	15.9 (60.6)	13.2 (55.8)	8.0 (46.4)	5.0 (41.0)	3.6 (38.5)	1.4 (34.5)
Average precipitation mm (inches)	98.5 (3.88)	60.1 (2.37)	44.2 (1.74)	20.7 (0.81)	16.0 (0.63)	4.6 (0.18)	0.3 (0.01)	12.8 (0.50)	58.6 (2.31)	82.9 (3.26)	92.3 (3.63)	109.2 (4.30)	600.2 (23.62)
Average relative humidity (%)	79	79	79	77	74	71	69	73	77	78	77	79	76
Mean monthly sunshine hours	176.7	194.3	235.6	261.0	310.0	351.0	384.4	362.7	282.0	220.1	189.0	164.3	3,131.1
Source 1: Meteo Climate (1981-2010 Data), climatetemp.info (Sun Data)
Source 2: NSO Malta

== Music ==
- Vilhena Band Club (Società Filarmonica Vilhena) was founded in 1874. The first musical director of the band was Mro. Giuseppe Borg, and the first president of the Society was Baldassare Portanier.

== Floriana community services ==
- St Publius Parish Church, Triq Sarria (Sarria Street)
- Floriana Local Council, Pjazza Emanuel S. Tonna (Emanuel S. Tonna Square)
- Floriana Police Station, Triq Sant' Anna (St. Anne Street)
- Floriana Malta Labour Party Club, Triq Sant' Anna (St. Anne Street)
- Floriana Partit Nazzjonalista Club, Pjazza Sant' Anna (St. Anne Square)
- Sir Paul Boffa Hospital, Sqaq Ħarper (Harper Lane)
- Floriana Health Centre, Triq Franġisk Saver Fenech (Frances Xavier Fenech Street)
- Central Public Library, Triq Joseph J. Mangion (J.J. Mangion Street)

== Zones in Floriana ==
- Balzunetta Named after Barcelonnette in France, hence translated to " Balzunetta"
- Belt il-Ħażna, limits of Blata l-Bajda
- Belt-is-Sebħ
- Msida Bastions
- Crown Works, limits of Blata l-Bajda
- Fuq il-Biskuttin
- Foss Horns
- Foss Notre Dame
- Ġnien tal-Milorda
- Il-Funtana ta' Tritoni (Triton Fountain (Malta))
- Hay Wharf (Xatt it-Tiben)
- The Granaries (Pjazza San Publju/Il-Fosos )
- Il-Mall
- Independence Arena (Xagħra tal-Furjana)
- Jubilee Grove
- Sa Maison
- Sarria
- Tal-Bombi
- Valletta Waterfront/Pinto Wharf (Xatt ta' Pinto)
- Xatt il-Kanuni

=== The Granaries (Pjazza San Publju - il-Fosos) ===
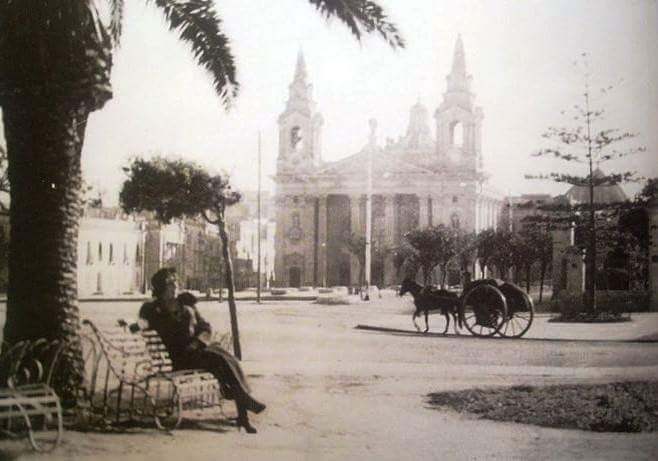
Il-Fosos in the 1920s

The granaries are pits dug into the ground and covered by circular stone slabs. They were primarily used for the storage of Grain. Granaries can be found throughout Valletta and Floriana. The first granaries were built by the Knights to provide for storage within the fortifications in case of a siege. As the system of storage was reliable and efficient, the British authorities copied in all details the Knights’ granaries. The Granaries proved their worth as they continued to provide grain for the starving population during World War 2. The highest grouping of granaries (a total of 76) is found here.

‘Il-Fosos’ or The Granaries and now officially named Pjazza San Publju, is also one of the largest urban open spaces in Malta and is therefore use for mass gatherings. One important gathering was held in May 1990 during the Pope John Paul II visit to Malta. During the second Papal visit on 9 May 2001, the Pope beatified three Maltese in this square, one of whom was eventually canonised (St Gorg Preca). As Malta is a predominantly Catholic country, this is considered to be an important event in Malta’s history. A third papal visit took place on 18 April 2010 by Pope Benedict XVI. The Isle of MTV summer festival is among other major events held here.

In 2018, James Aaron Ellul started a campaign to safeguard the granaries as nobody seems ready to take ownership for damaged Granaries. Ellul, insisted that the appropriate care required to preserve the Granaries is not being provided, and that even government authorities were not taking ownership of the historical site and that the square is yet to receive a damage assessment over its constant use as a mass meeting place.

(see also Main article on Granaries in Malta)

== Regeneration and Demographic Challenges in Floriana ==
In the years preceding the 2024 Maltese local elections, Floriana faced mounting concerns related to urban decline and a significant reduction in its residential population. Once a vibrant locality bordering Valletta, Floriana experienced decades of depopulation, ageing infrastructure, and underutilised public spaces, prompting calls for a comprehensive regeneration strategy.

The town’s historic character, while architecturally significant, presented practical challenges for contemporary living. Many properties remained vacant or in disrepair, and the lack of modern amenities, particularly for families, contributed to a continued exodus of residents. These conditions sparked increased political and civic attention ahead of the elections.

In early 2025, Deputy Mayor James Aaron Ellul presented a formal Regeneration Policy Document for Floriana, outlining a long-term vision to reverse demographic decline and renew the locality’s infrastructure. The document proposed a range of measures, including incentives to attract new residents, the adaptive reuse of public gardens such as Jubilee Grove and the Pinetum Gardens, improved accessibility and public transport links, and the restoration of key historic sites.

Prior to his election to office, Ellul actively promoted a vision for a more vibrant and sustainable Floriana, advocating for policies focused on quality of life, heritage preservation, and green public spaces.

The regeneration document was unanimously approved by the Floriana Local Council, reflecting cross-party recognition of the locality’s structural and demographic challenges. This consensus marked a significant milestone in local governance, reinforcing the urgency and shared responsibility for revitalising Floriana.

These efforts positioned regeneration and demographic sustainability as central themes in the political agenda, with both national and local actors recognising the strategic importance of Floriana as a historical gateway and potential model for urban renewal across Malta.

== Notable people ==
- Edwin Busuttil, politician and public figure
- Oliver Friggieri, author, lecturer
- Henry Frendo, historian, lecturer
- Peppi Azzopardi, producer, TV Presenter
- Michael Frendo, politician
- Maria Grech Ganado, writer, lecturer
- Robert Samut, music writer, doctor
- Kevin Borg, singer
- Mauro Caruana, bishop
- John Holland, footballer

== Twin towns – sister cities ==
Floriana is twinned with:

- Macerata, Italy
- Kerċem, Malta
