= May Butcher =

Maltese translator (1886–1950)

May Butcher (26 August 1886 in Great Grimsby, Lincolnshire – 21 December 1950 in Malta) was an English-born Maltese writer who translated several works from the Maltese language into English.

Butcher was the fourth of nine children of Colonel Henry Townsend Butcher and Annie Susan Dalrymple-Hay.

She translated the words of the Maltese national anthem (L-Innu Malti), and translated the biography of Mikiel Anton Vassalli.

One of her most important works is the book Elements in Maltese, published in 1938, which provides details not only on the Semitic aspect of the Maltese language, but also gives importance to the Romance aspect.

A street in Iklin, Malta bears her name.
