= Robert Samut Hall =

- Sala Robert Samut
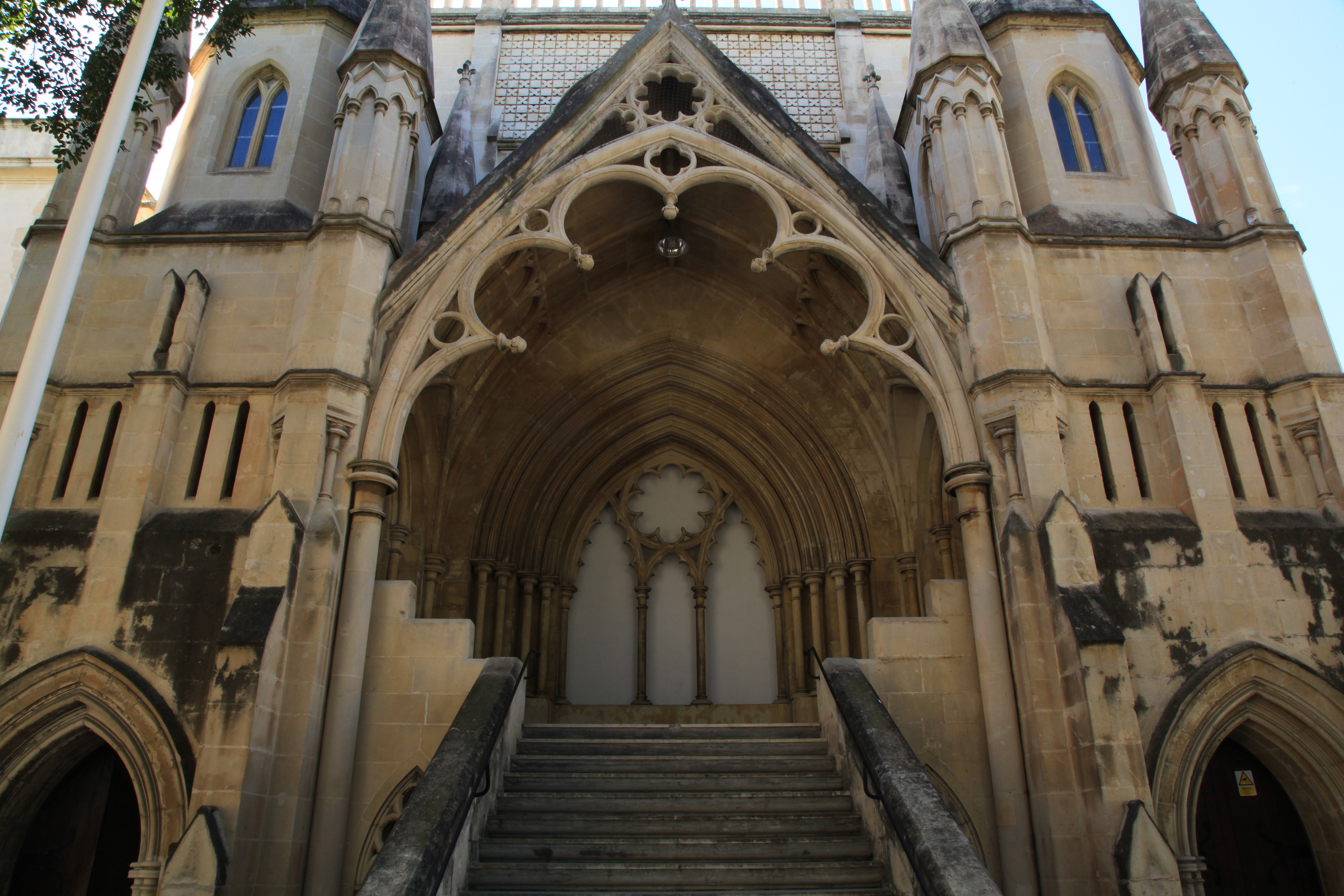
- Façade of the building

- Location within Malta
- 35°53′30.8″N 14°30′11.8″E
- Location: Floriana
- Country: Malta
- Denomination: Secularized
- Previous denomination: Methodist Church of Great Britain

History
- Former name: Wesleyan (Methodist) Church
- Founded: 1881

Architecture
- Functional status: Music Hall
- Architect: Thomas Mullet Ellis
- Style: Neo-Gothic
- Completed: 1883

The Robert Samut Hall is a late 19th-century defunct Methodist church, formerly named Wesleyan (Methodist) Church, now a state owned building in Floriana, Malta.

== Origins ==
The current Neo-Gothic church was built between 1881 and 1883 on designs by architect Thomas Mullet Ellis. It was opened for worship on 18 March 1883. It was the first building in Malta to make use of electricity.

Interior of the hall

== Secularised ==
The church was given to the government in the early 1970s. On 4 April 1975, the building was inaugurated as a centre for cultural activities and renamed Robert Samut Hall. The hall houses an interesting 2 manual pneumatic Willis organ.

== See also ==
- Culture of Malta
- History of Malta
- List of Churches in Malta
- Religion in Malta
