= Church of the Flight into Egypt =

- Knisja tal-Ħarba lejn l-Eġittu
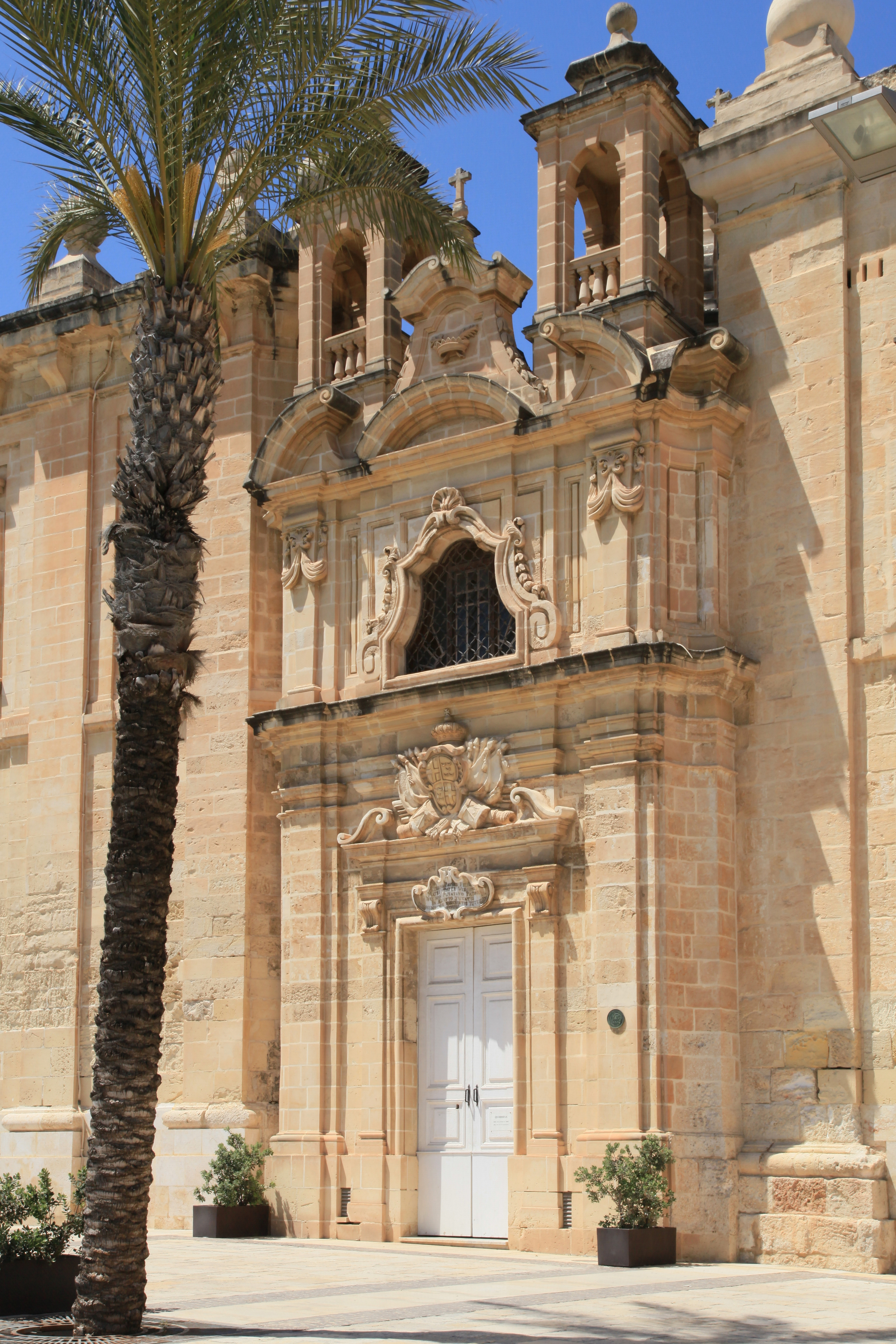

- Location within Malta
- 35°53′26.1″N 14°30′30.3″E
- Location: Floriana
- Country: Malta
- Denomination: Roman Catholic

History
- Status: Active
- Founder: Manuel Pinto da Fonseca
- Dedication: Flight into Egypt
- Dedicated: 1752

Architecture
- Functional status: Church
- Architect: Andrea Belli
- Architectural type: Church
- Style: Baroque
- Completed: 1752

Specifications
- Materials: Limestone

Administration
- Archdiocese: Malta

Clergy
- Rector: Paul Attard

The Church of the Flight into Egypt (Maltese: Il-kappella tal-Ħarba lejn l-Eġittu) is a Roman Catholic church located at the Valletta Waterfront in Floriana, Malta. The church was built in the 18th-century on the baroque design of Andrea Belli for spiritual service of the workers at the Pinto Stores. The church was hit by aerial bombardment in World War II in 1941 and it was then restored in 1989 but it remained unconsecrated. It was opened for church service again in 2006 together with the Valletta Waterfront. The current rector is Paul Attard.

== History ==
The church is the only one in the country dedicated to the Flight into Egypt. The chapel was built during the reign of Grand Master Manuel Pinto da Fonseca in the 1750s. It was used by departing and arriving sailors. The design for the baroque church is attributed to architect Andrea Belli. Even though the church is small, the architect made sure to include all characteristics that a bigger church would have such as two bell towers and cupola. An inscription above the door reads:

Aeterna Patris Figlio Matri Semper Vergini, Nec Non Putativo Patris In Aegypto Tutatis in Humilimae Servitutis Titulum. MDCCLII

The inscription includes a Roman number 1752, the year the church was dedicated. Above the inscription there is the coat of arms of Grand Master Pinto adorned by an imperial crown. The church which was extensively damaged during an air raid on 16 January 1941, but it was restored in 1989. The chapel was inaugurated on July 28, 2006 as part of the Valletta Waterfront project.

== Interior ==
The titular painting above the high altar depicts the flight of the Holy Family into Egypt. The painting depicts the Virgin Mary, with baby Jesus in her hands, resting under the shade of a palm tree, while on their way to Egypt. Saint Joseph is portrayed pulling his donkey to have some shade while some angels are shown looking over the Holy Family. The interior walls are richly decorated with sculptures, making the church a rich example of baroque architecture.

== See also ==
- Culture of Malta
- History of Malta
- List of Churches in Malta
- Religion in Malta
