= Valletta Waterfront =

Coordinates: 35°53′24″N 14°30′29″E

- Xatt ta' Pinto
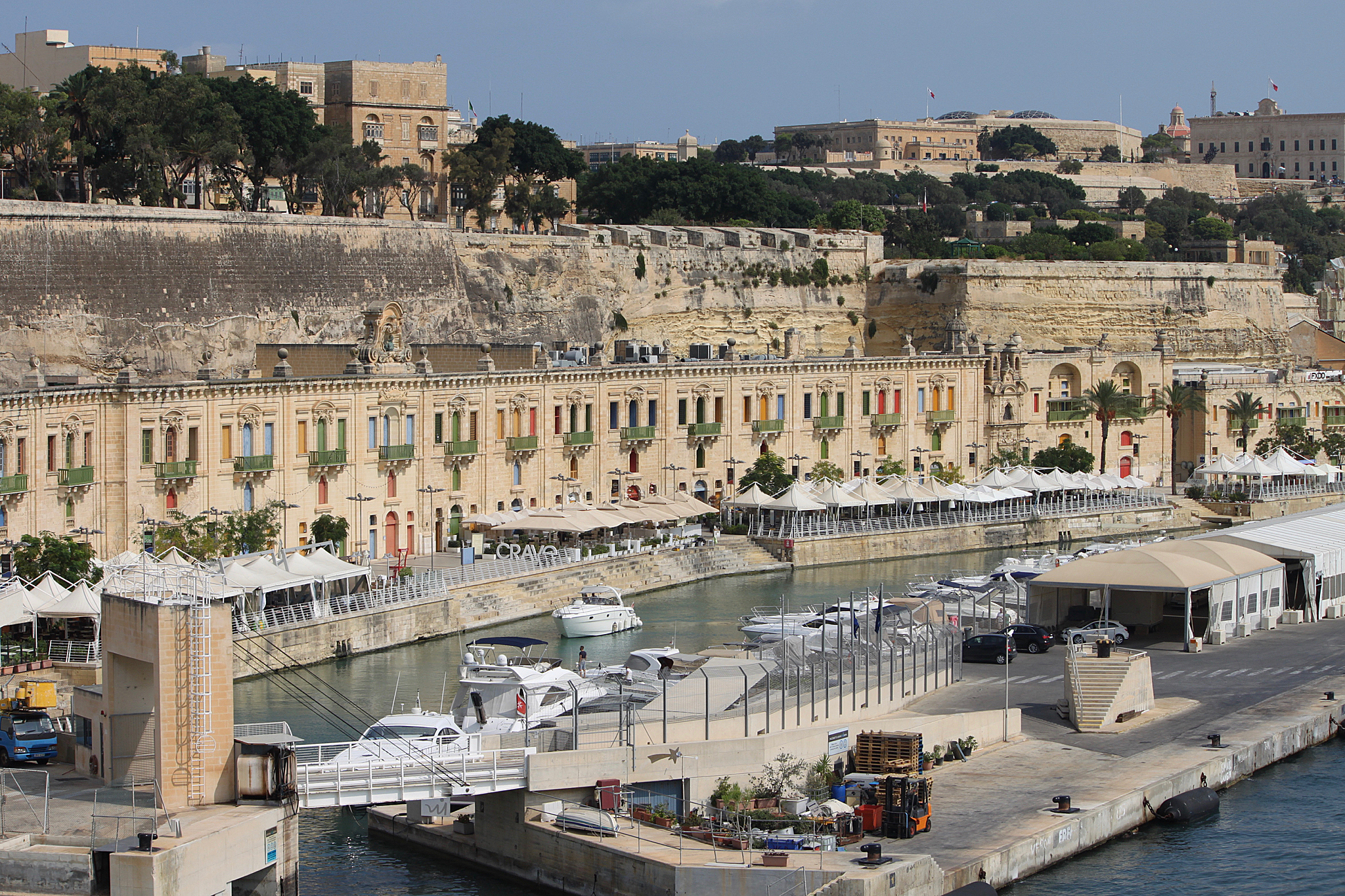
- The Valletta Waterfront outside Floriana Lines
- Interactive map of the Valletta Waterfront area
- Former names: Valletta Marina

General information
- Status: Partially intact
- Type: Wharf, stores
- Architectural style: Baroque
- Location: Floriana, Malta
- Opened: 10 August 1752; 2006
- Owner: Government of Malta and private property

Technical details
- Material: Limestone
- Floor count: 3

Design and construction
- Architect: Andrea Belli (attributed)

The Valletta Waterfront, is a promenade in Floriana, Malta, mainly featuring three prominent buildings: a church in the middle, the Pinto Stores or the Pinto Wharf on the left, and the Forni Stores or the Forni Shopping Complex on the right. The buildings were originally stores and warehouses, built in the 18th century, and the design is attributed to Andrea Belli.

The building project was officiated on 10 August 1752, with a mass festivity. The Forni Stores were used as the first British naval bakeries in Malta and were used for this function until 1844. The area is now a hub in Malta's cruise liner business as the Forni Cruise Passenger Terminal, and hosts a concentration of bars, retail outlets, and restaurants. The area was and remains a venue for several concerts and events.

== History ==
The Valletta Marina was first developed in July 1727 by Grand Master Anton Manuel de Vilhena when, according to a notarial deed of Gaspard Dominic Chircop, "a store-house with marble oil-vats" was built.

Further stores and warehouse were added in 1752, that included 19 imposing stores and a church, built by Grandmaster Manuel Pinto de Fonseca. The buildings, including the stores and the church, have a Baroque design attributed to Andrea Belli.

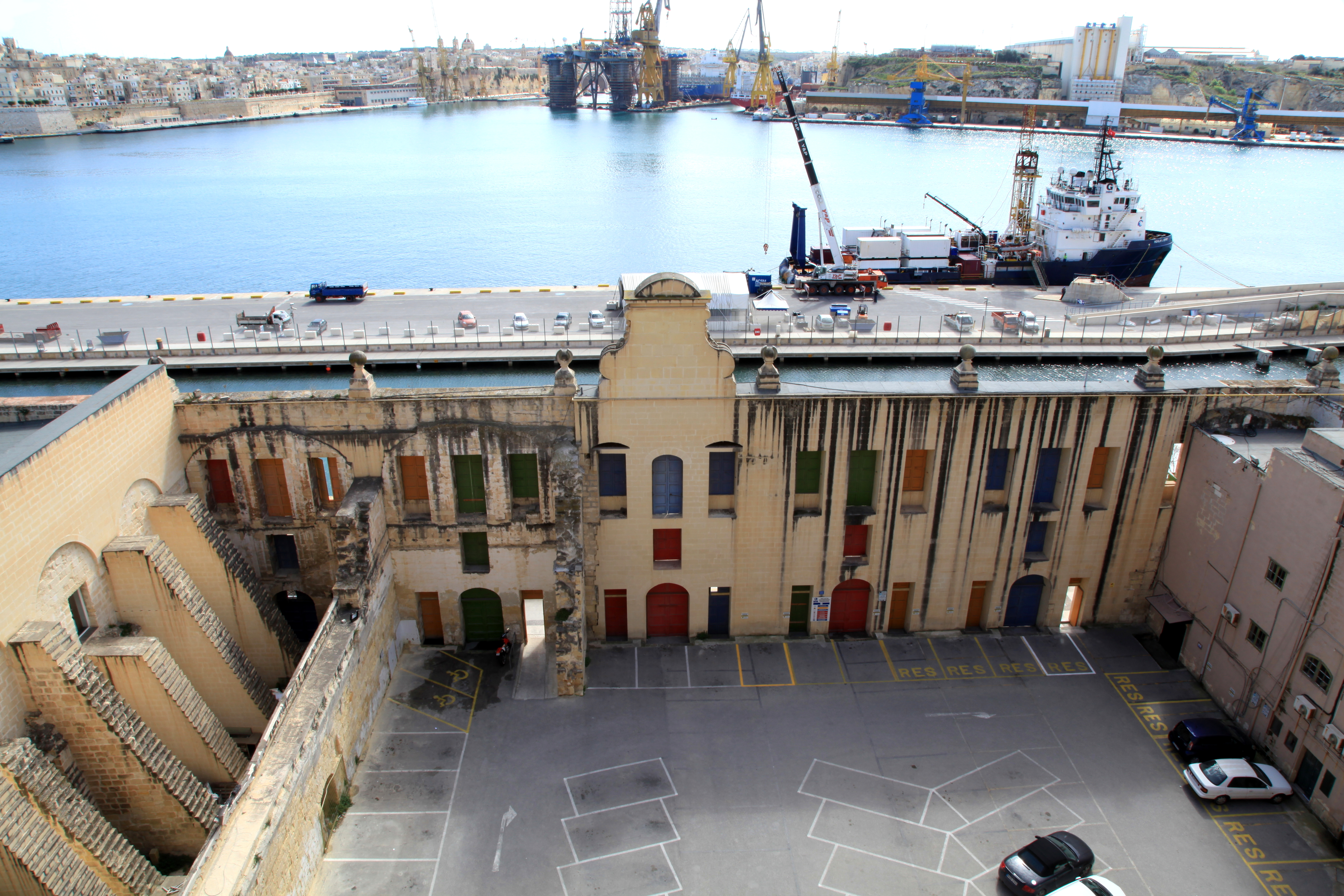
The car park behind the rebuilt facades

The area was devastated by aerial bombardment in World War II, due to its proximity to the Malta Dockyard and the British naval forces in Grand Harbour. Some of the stores were completely destroyed during the war.

The area was thoroughly restored and renovated. Some buildings, which had been completely or partially destroyed in the WWII, saw their facades rebuilt at the exclusion of the interior. The area behind these rebuilt facades is now a car park. The doors of the buildings are painted with different colours, symbolising the different types of goods that were once stored in them; blue represents the storage of fish, green for agricultural products, yellow for wheat and red for wine.

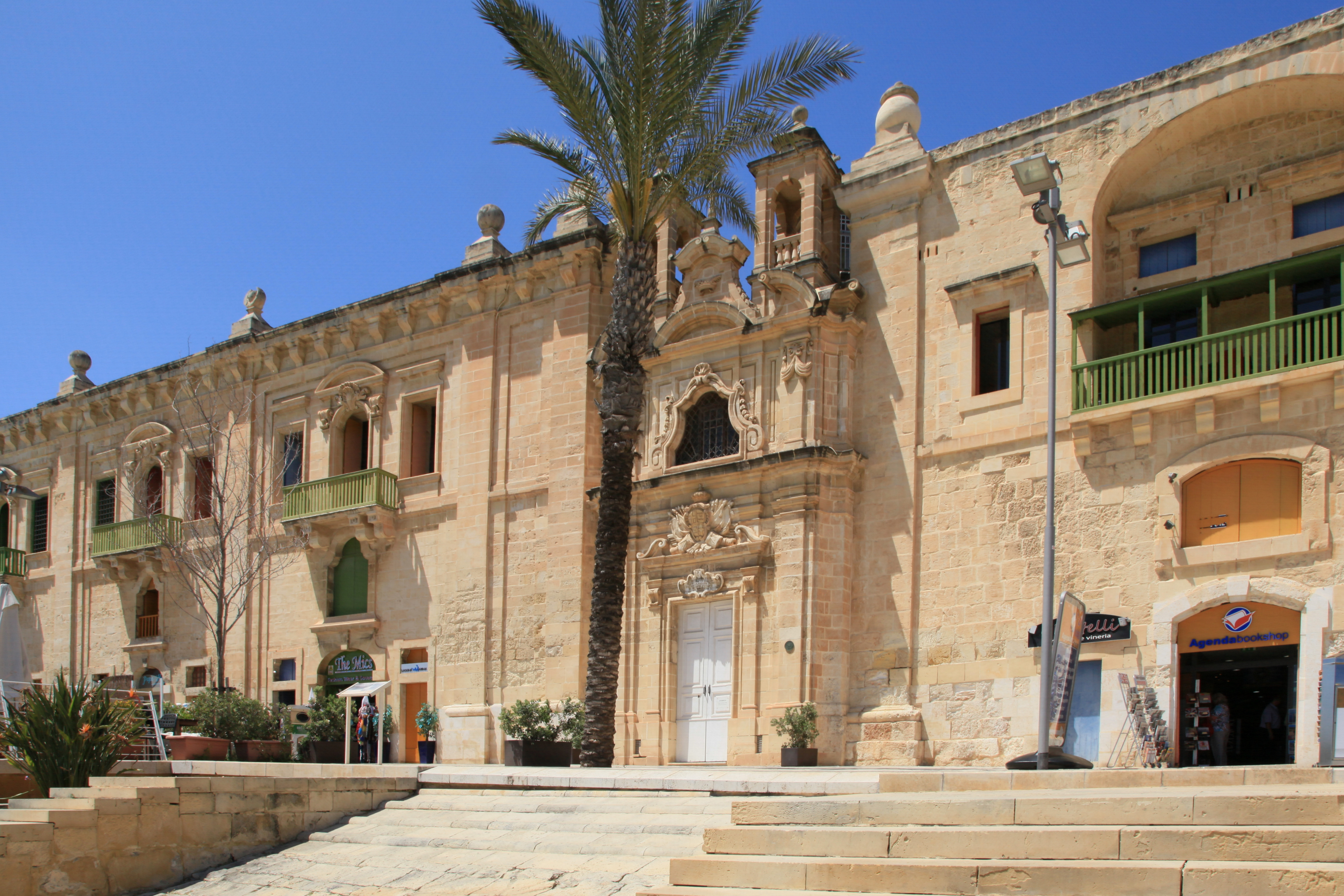
Flight into Egypt Church

The Valletta Waterfront is run by a private consortium who offers management overseeing Malta's cruise liner business. The waterfront hosts roughly twelve restaurants, a number of bars and retail outlets. Various events are held at the area and the close vicinity, such as the Malta Jazz Festival and the Malta Fireworks Festival.

The Church of the Flight into Egypt was built in 1752, along with the stores, was bombed in the Second World War and the damaged parts have since been faithfully rebuilt similar to the original and the original remains were restored. Mass is celebrated at the church every Saturday evening. A bronze image of the face of Jesus was attached to the church and is now found with the façade of the Co-Cathedral of Saint John in Valletta.

The Pinto Stores were included on the Antiquities List of 1925, are a grade 1 national monument and they are listed on the National Inventory of the Cultural Property of the Maltese Islands (NICPMI).

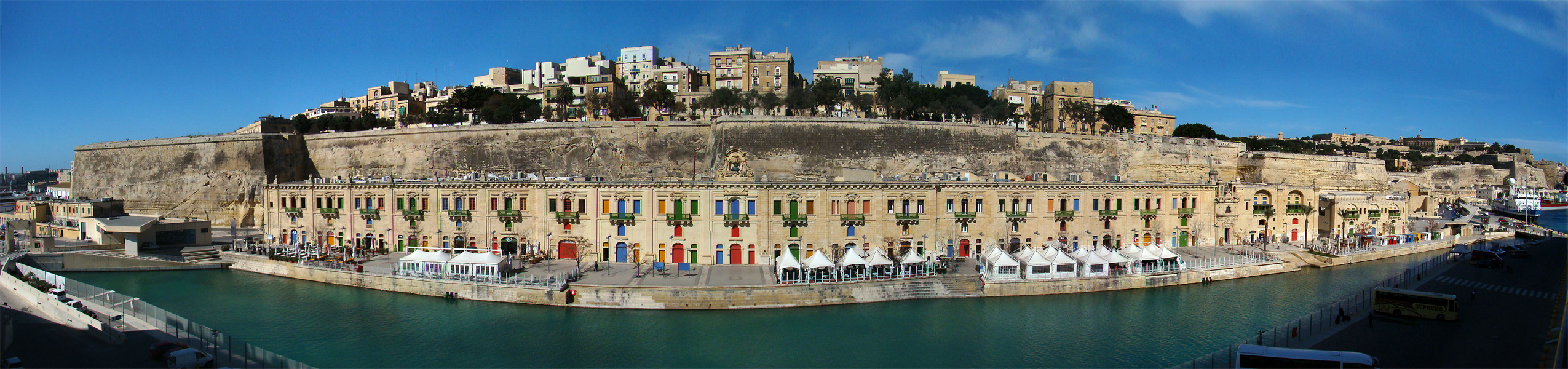
View of Valletta Waterfront (Pinto Stores) in Floriana
