= Robert Samut =

- Born: 17 October 1869
- Died: 26 May 1934 (aged 64)
- Genres: Classical
- Occupation: Composer
- Years active: 1920–1934

"L-Innu Malti" (instrumental)
Robert Samut's instrumental version of "L-Innu Malti" performed by the Manoel Theatre

Robert Samut (17 October 1869 – 26 May 1934) was a Maltese doctor and musician. He is best known for writing the music for "L-Innu Malti", the Maltese national anthem.

== Early life ==
Robert Samut was born at the Lion House in Floriana, Malta, 4th son of Marianna Darmanin and Giuseppe Samut. He studied medicine at the Royal University of Malta and the University of Edinburgh, 1890-95, where he graduated with an MB ChB, receiving a medal for his exceptional ability in anatomy.

From his youth he had shown musical inclinations, and had wanted to study music, but his father did not approve, and consequently he continued his career in medicine, following in the footsteps of two elder brothers (Richard and Carmelo), who were already well known doctors. His eldest brother, Lt Col Achilles Samut, was in the Army Ordnance Corps and later became a Malta Senator 1921-29 and served in Sir Gerald Strickland's government 1927-29.

== Military career ==
On his return to Malta from Edinburgh, he was appointed Professor of Physiology and Bacteriology at the Royal University of Malta. He was also nominated specialist of Pathology at the Central Civil Hospital in Floriana (a building which now houses the Island's Police HQ).

In 1897 Prof. Robert Samut joined The King's Own Malta Regiment of Militia as Lieutenant Surgeon. He was promoted to Captain in 1900 and Major in 1909.

Immediately following the earthquake at Messina in 1908, he rushed to the devastated city to give his help. His meritorious service was recognised by the King of Italy, who named him Cavaliere Ufficiale della Corona d’Italia, and also by the award of the Red Cross Diploma.

In 1915, during the First World War, he was posted with his regiment to Cyprus where he was given command of the Forest Military Hospital in Limassol. His work was highly acclaimed and was mentioned in various despatches and also received the General Service Medal.

== Medical career ==
In 1920 he was appointed Professor of Pathology at the Royal University of Malta on the death of his brother Carmelo, who had been Professor of Pathology 1894-1920. It was this position that eventually was to cause his death. He had been asked to carry out an autopsy on a woman who had died with a strange illness and for reasons that are not well understood, he was infected with her illness. Prof Robert Samut pioneered the first tests (although primitive) on certain sexually transmitted diseases on the Maltese Islands.

Even though Prof. Robert Samut was busy with this position, he still paid house calls to his patients. The period following the First World War, and even more so with the events that led the 1919 Sette Gugnio riots, many of the Floriana residents were poor and he would treat them for free.

== Maltese National Anthem ==
While studying in Edinburgh he had once been asked to sing the Maltese Anthem, and the fact that Malta did not have one, induced him to do something about it.

He wrote some simple notes, however the pressure of his work made him forget about them. Then one day in the early 1920s having been asked by Albert Laferla, his brother-in-law, the then Director of Elementary Schools, to compose a hymn for school children, he remembered his notes, and used them to compose the present hymn. Dr. Laferla then took that music to the National Poet Dun Karm, who wrote the verses. It is reported that Dun Karm had stated that this was not the usual practice, as normally music was composed to the verses and not vice versa.

== Later years ==
In 1922 Samut was promoted to Lt. Colonel, but by now he was feeling the effects of the virus he contracted from the autopsy and his health was failing. He became an invalid and suffered his sickness till his death.

In the meantime the ball that he had started rolling was gathering momentum. On Saturday, 3 February 1923, the "Innu Malti" was played for the first time in public during a concert at the Manoel Theatre.

For a number of years the "Innu" was played only during 8 September celebrations. Then in 1936, the King's Own Band Club commissioned Mro. V. Ciappara to prepare a full score for the band, and played that hymn on 8 September of the same year. Other bands soon followed their example.

In 1938 an English translation prepared by Miss M. Butcher appeared in the Times of Malta.

Samut was not to see the growth of his music. He was taken to Australia with the hope that a long sea voyage might be of benefit to his health but it proved to be quite the contrary. Thus after only a short stay at that colony he returned to Malta and lived for a number of years in Sliema, with one of his daughters.

He married Alice Laferla, great-granddaughter of Sir Agostino Portelli, and had six children. He died peacefully at the age of 64 years, just after noon, on 26 May 1934, and was buried in the Portelli Chapel at the Addolorata Cemetery.

== Legacy ==
All the people of the Maltese Islands soon accepted the "Innu Malti" and it was customary that it be played on all occasions in conjunction with the "God Save the King". Later, when Malta obtained autonomy, the "Innu" was played for the Prime Minister.

The 1964 Independence Constitution, Chapter One (The State), Section 4 states that the National Anthem of these islands is to be the "Innu Malti". This was also confirmed by the "Republic" constitution. Thus finally, the music, written with the passion of a patriot, a hymn made into a prayer by a national poet, was crowned with the highest glory. Eventually an Act of Parliament laid down the exact format of the music and how it should be played. All this heralded a new era to the historic Maltese Islands, an era for which the Maltese had been fighting for many centuries. History is built step by step, but surely one of the foundation stones of the future history of Malta is the music of Robert Samut.

On 26 May 1968 Dr Giorgio Borġ Olivier, then Prime Minister of Independent Malta, in the presence of the Governor General and Lady Dorman, of His Grace Mgr Michael Gonzi, and many other personalities, unveiled a marble plaque on the façade of the Lion House to commemorate the birthplace of Prof. Samut. A leaflet, designed by the great artist Emvin Cremona was also printed for the occasion.

Nearby, on Triq Sarria, the old Wesleyan Methodist Chapel has been refurbished and renamed as the Robert Samut Concert Hall in his honour.
