= Floriana basketball club =

Basketball club based in Floriana, Malta

The Floriana Basketball Club was founded in 1977 and is affiliated to the Malta Basketball Association. This Club was founded under the auspices of the Fsobians Club of Floriana and for the first two seasons it played under the name of Fsobians Basketball Team with the first Chairman of the Club being Nigel Holland. The present premises of the Club is at the Independence Arena in Floriana.
