= Sarria Church =

- Church of the Immaculate Conception
- Knisja tal-Immakulata Kunċizzjoni (Ta' Sarria)
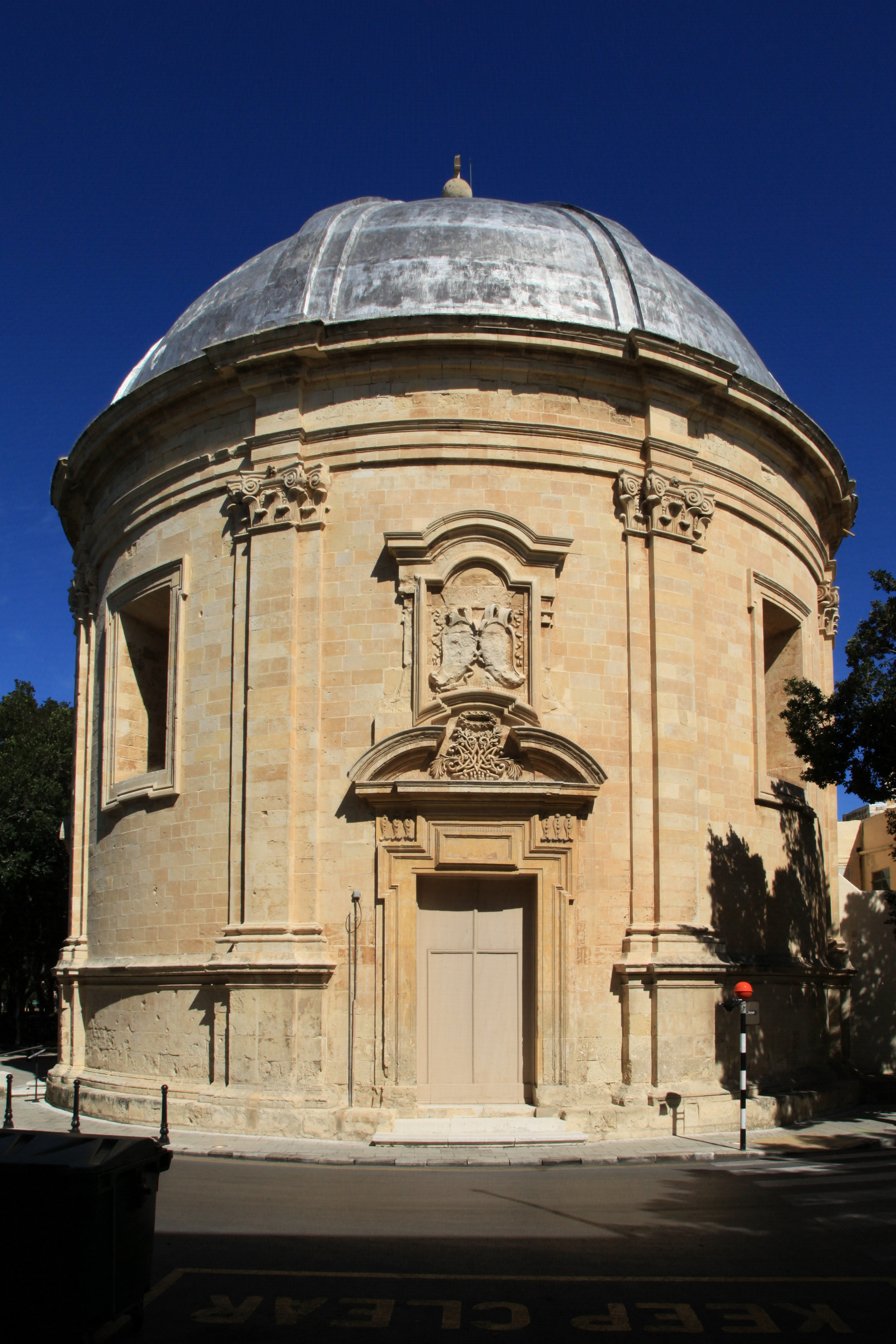

- Location within Malta
- 35°53′31.0″N 14°30′13.1″E
- Location: Floriana
- Country: Malta
- Denomination: Roman Catholic

History
- Status: Active
- Founder: Martin Sarria Navarra

Architecture
- Functional status: Church
- Architect(s): Mattia Preti; Lorenzo Gafà
- Architectural type: Rotunda

Administration
- Archdiocese: Malta

Clergy
- Rector: Lino Spiteri

The Church of the Immaculate Conception known also as Sarria Church is a Roman Catholic Rotunda church in Floriana, Malta.

== History ==
The original chapel was built in 1585 with funds provided by the Knight Fra Martin Sarria Navarra. Following the devastation that the plague of 1675–76 brought on the country, Grand Master Nicolas Cotoner built in its place another church dedicated to the Immaculate Conception as a sign of thanksgiving. The church was designed by prominent painter Mattia Preti. It is vital to note that this was the only church designed by Preti. It was built under the direction of architect Lorenzo Gafà.

The Sarria Church served as a temporary parish church for Floriana from 1942 to 1944, after the St Publius Parish Church was damaged by aerial bombardment.

== Interior ==
The most precious possession of this church are the seven large canvases that surround the interior, painted by Mattia Preti. The altarpiece, also by Preti, depicts the Immaculate Conception with angels sheltering their swords after defeating the plague of 1675–76.

== See also ==
- Culture of Malta
- History of Malta
- List of Churches in Malta
- Religion in Malta
