= Maria Grech Ganado =

Maltese poet and translator

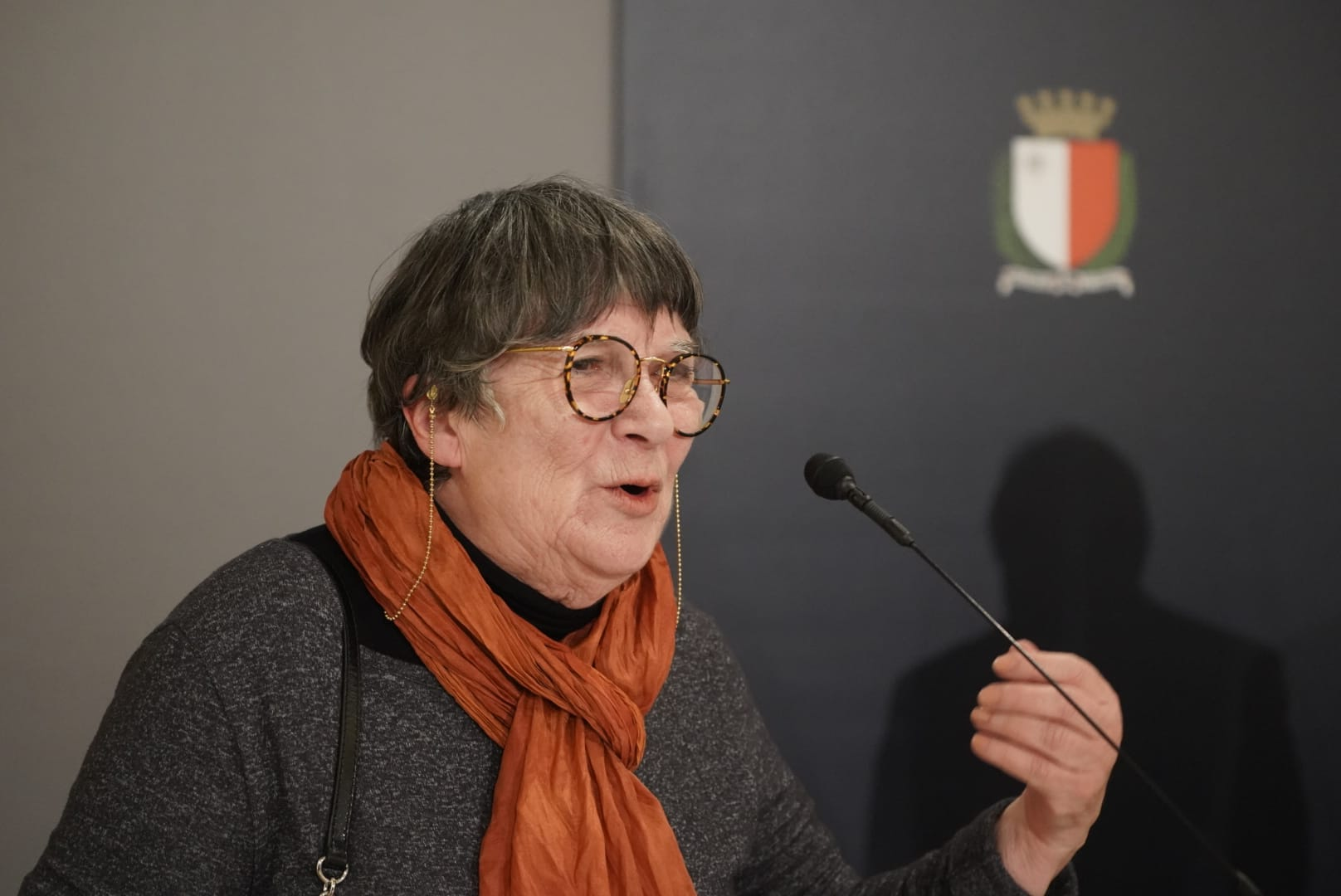

Maria Grech Ganado (born 1943, in Lija), considered to be from Floriana, is a Maltese author and academic.

== Education ==
Grech Ganado obtained her secondary education at St Joseph High School (Valletta) the Marija Regina Secondary School, in Hamrun. She attended the University of Malta where she obtained a BA in English Literature. She was awarded a second BA from the University of Cambridge. She went on to read for a Master's degree jointly between the University of Malta and the University of Heidelberg. She returned to Malta to take up an academic position in the Department of English at the University, and is notable for being the first Maltese female full-time lecturer at the University of Malta. She retired from teaching in 2003.

== Literary work ==
Grech Ganado has written poetry in both Maltese and English, and is widely published. She has won the National Book prize for Poetry four times and received the Lifetime Achievement Award by the National Book Council in 2015, as also the first Maltese Poet Laureate award in 2020. Her work forms part of the National Curriculum at MATSEC level and has been translated into 12 other languages.

In 2000, Ganado Grech was awarded the Midalja għall-Qadi tar-Repubblika in recognition for her service to Maltese Literature. She also holds a Gieh il-Floriana award. In 2023 she was awarded a D.Litt.(Honoris Causa) by the University of Malta.

== Personal life ==
Ganado Grech married Louis Grech in 1972, and they have three children; Xandru, Francesca and Louisa. She has spoken out about her struggle with mental health issues.

== Bibliography ==
many poems in various anthologies, both local and abroad (including the UK's literary mags, 'Orbis', 'Envoi' and 'Cinnamon Press') as well as complete collections:

- Iżda Mhux Biss, 1999
- Skont Eva, 2001
- Ribcage, 2003
- Fil-Ħofra Bejn Spallejha, 2005
- Cracked Canvas, 2005
- Memory Rape, 2005
- Monografija, 2010
- Taħt il-Kpiepel t'Għajnejja, 2014
- Framed, 2018
- The Bell, 2023
