= Nazju Falzon =

Maltese cleric (1813–1865)

Blessed Nazju Falzon O.F.S.

Cleric
- Born: 1 July 1813; Valletta, Malta
- Died: 1 July 1865 (aged 52); Valletta, Malta
- Venerated in: Roman Catholic Church
- Beatified: 9 May 2001, Floriana, Malta by Pope John Paul II
- Feast: 1 July
- Attributes: Clerical cassock; Crucifix
- Patronage: Catechists

Nazju Falzon (1 July 1813 – 1 July 1865) was a Maltese cleric and a professed member from the Secular Franciscan Order. He did not become an ordained priest because he did not feel he was adequate enough for such an honor. He became an apt catechist and noted for his commitment to religious instruction.

Falzon's beatification took place in mid-2001 in Malta when Pope John Paul II visited the island nation.

== Life ==
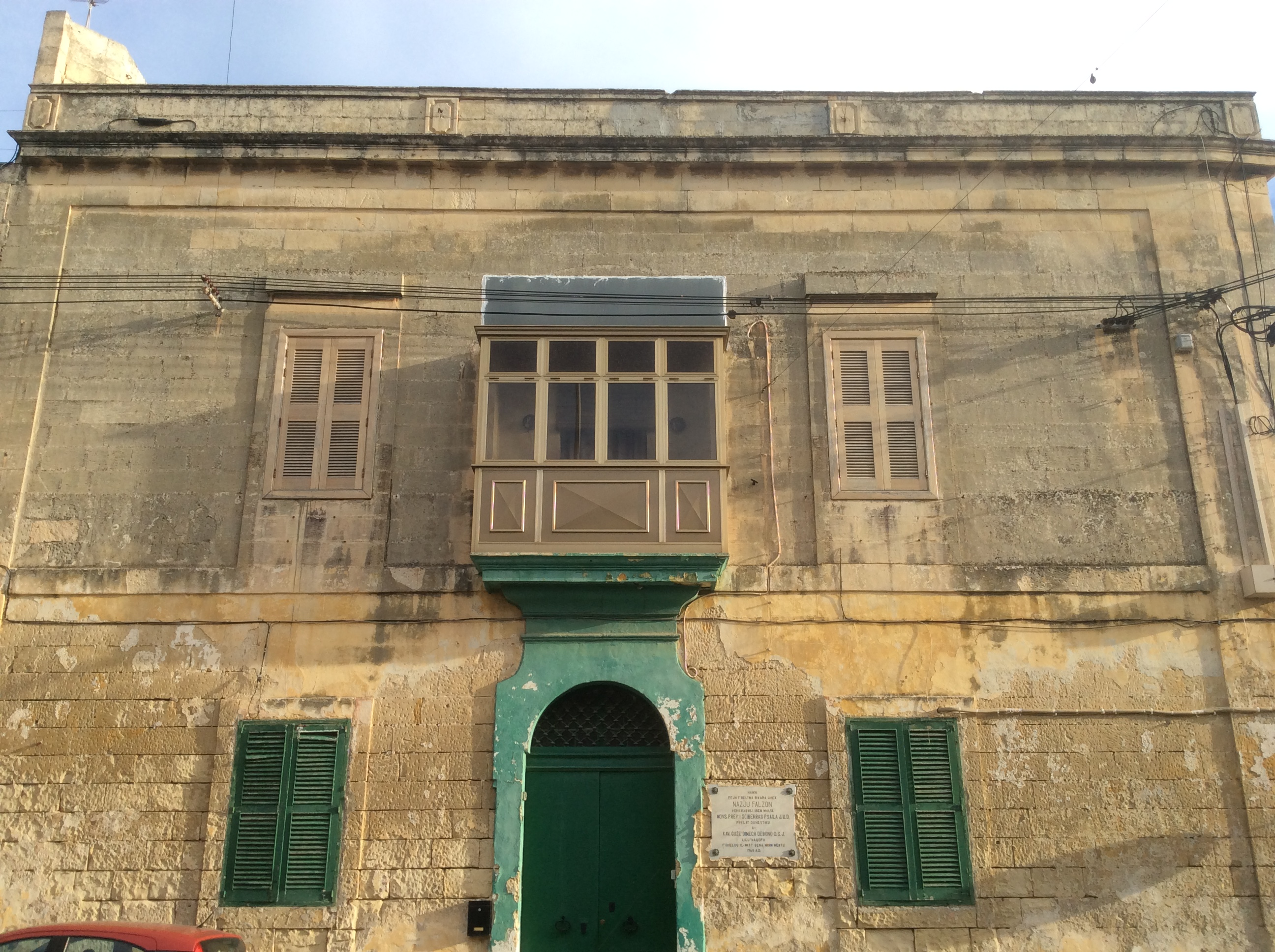
Nazju Falzon Palace - his house in Birkirkara.

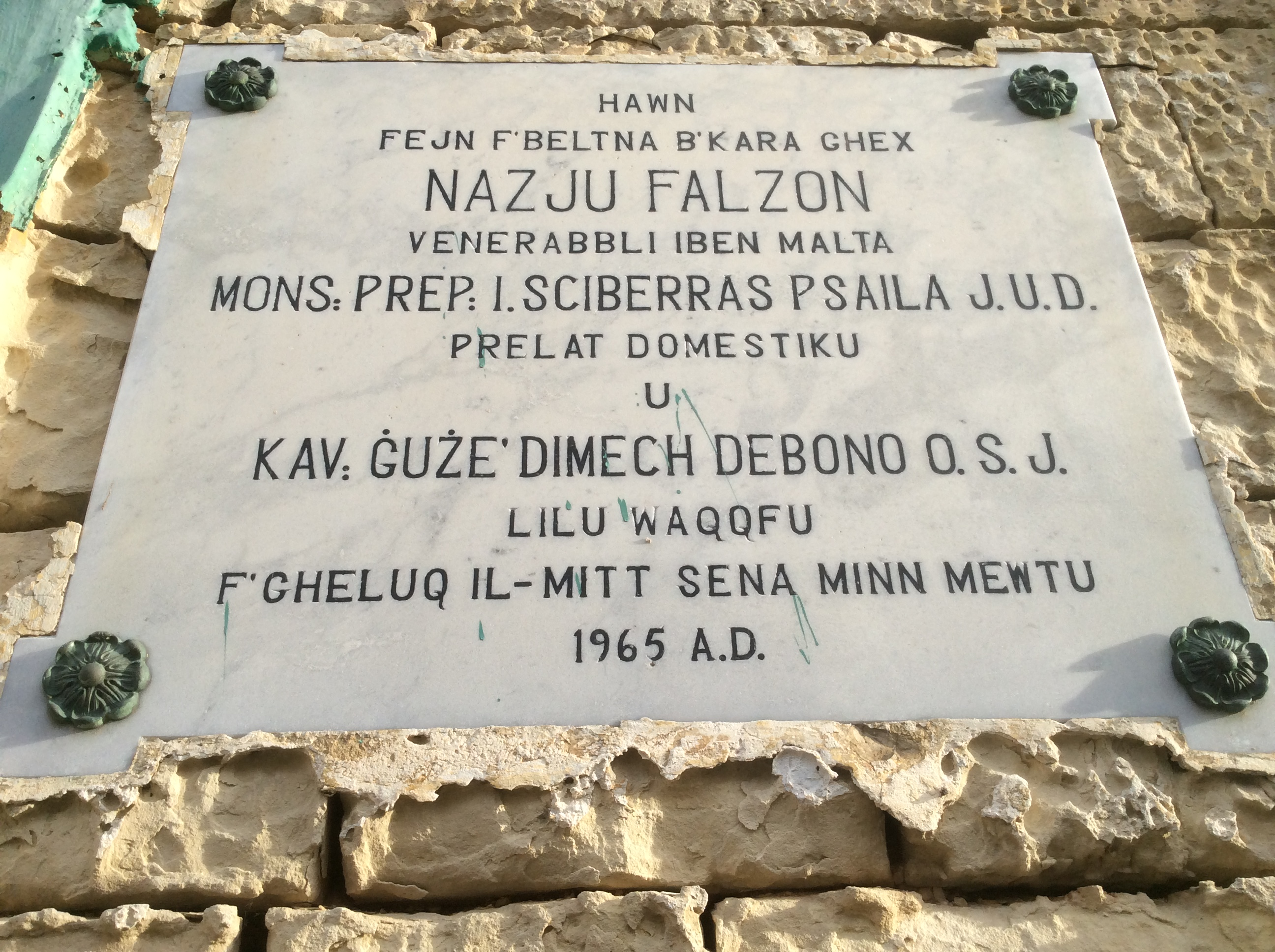
Plaque on his house in Birkirkara.

Nazju Falzon was born in Malta in a big house on Strait Street on 1 July 1813 to Francis Joseph Falzon (a judge) and Maria Teresa Debono (the daughter of the judge Calcedonio Debono). Falzon was baptized on 2 July in the church of Porto Salvo in the names of "Rocco Angelo Sebastiano Vincenzo Naju Rosario Falzon". He had three brothers; all four became lawyers and two of the brothers entered the priesthood. His brother Anthony became a lawyer and married while his two brothers Kalcidon and Francis became priests.

He obtained a doctorate in law on 7 September 1833. He received the tonsure and his clerical habit on 20 December 1828 and on 21 December 1828 was instituted as a cleric in a Mass that Mgr. Publius M. Sant presided over.

Falzon received the minor orders on both 21 August 1831 and on 18 December 1831 but did not wish to be ordained as a priest on the basis of unworthiness despite the local bishop's encouragement. He taught also catechism to local children first at the Institute of the Good Shepherd and became quite fluent in English due to the fact that the British were present across the island nation. Falzon also worked with the British soldiers and sailors who were stationed on Malta which at the time was a British protectorate; he would seek out the men at their assigned positions. Those who were interested were brought to his own home for services. More grew interested in this and it forced him to move and he soon found a new home for his work at a Jesuit church in the capital of Valletta. The soldiers would leave their valuables with him if the soldiers had to go to the battlefield in the knowledge that he would pass them on to their loved ones if killed or missing.

He imported simple texts in various vernacular languages and distributed them to his flock to read; he was also a writer and was responsible for "The Comfort of the Christian Soul". He became a mentor to those who remained on the island and served them as a pastor and performing marriages as well as [baptisms and funerals. He had a strong devotion to the Eucharist and to the Archangel Raphael as well as devotions to Saint Joseph and to Benedict Joseph Labre.

Falzon died in 1865 due to a heart attack (he experienced heart spasms for a long duration) and was interred in the Falzon Vault though later moved to the Chapel of the Immaculate Conception in the local Franciscan church. The Franciscan priest Marjan Vella wrote a biographical account of the late cleric titled "Glorja tal-Kleru Malti".

== Beatification ==
The beatification cause opened in an informative process that spanned from 1882 until its closure in 1889. Falzon's writings spiritual writings were approved by theologians on 16 December 1902, and Falzon's cause was formally opened on 13 April 1904 under Pope Pius X, granting him the title of Servant of God. Theologians granted their approval to the cause after meeting on 10 February 1987 while the Congregation for the Causes of Saints did so as well on 6 October 1987. Falzon was named as Venerable on 23 October 1987 after Pope John Paul II confirmed that the late Maltese cleric led a life of heroic virtue.

The process for a miracle took place in the diocese of its origin and concluded on 28 June 1999 before the C.C.S. validated the process on 5 February 2000; a medical board approved this on 19 February 2001 which theologians and the C.C.S. also backed up. John Paul II approved this miracle and beatified Falzon on his visit to Malta on 9 May 2001. The beatification miracle involved the 1981 cure of a man stricken with cancer.

The current postulator for this cause is Fra Giovangiuseppe Califano.
