= L-Innu Malti =

National anthem of Malta

English: 'The Maltese Anthem'
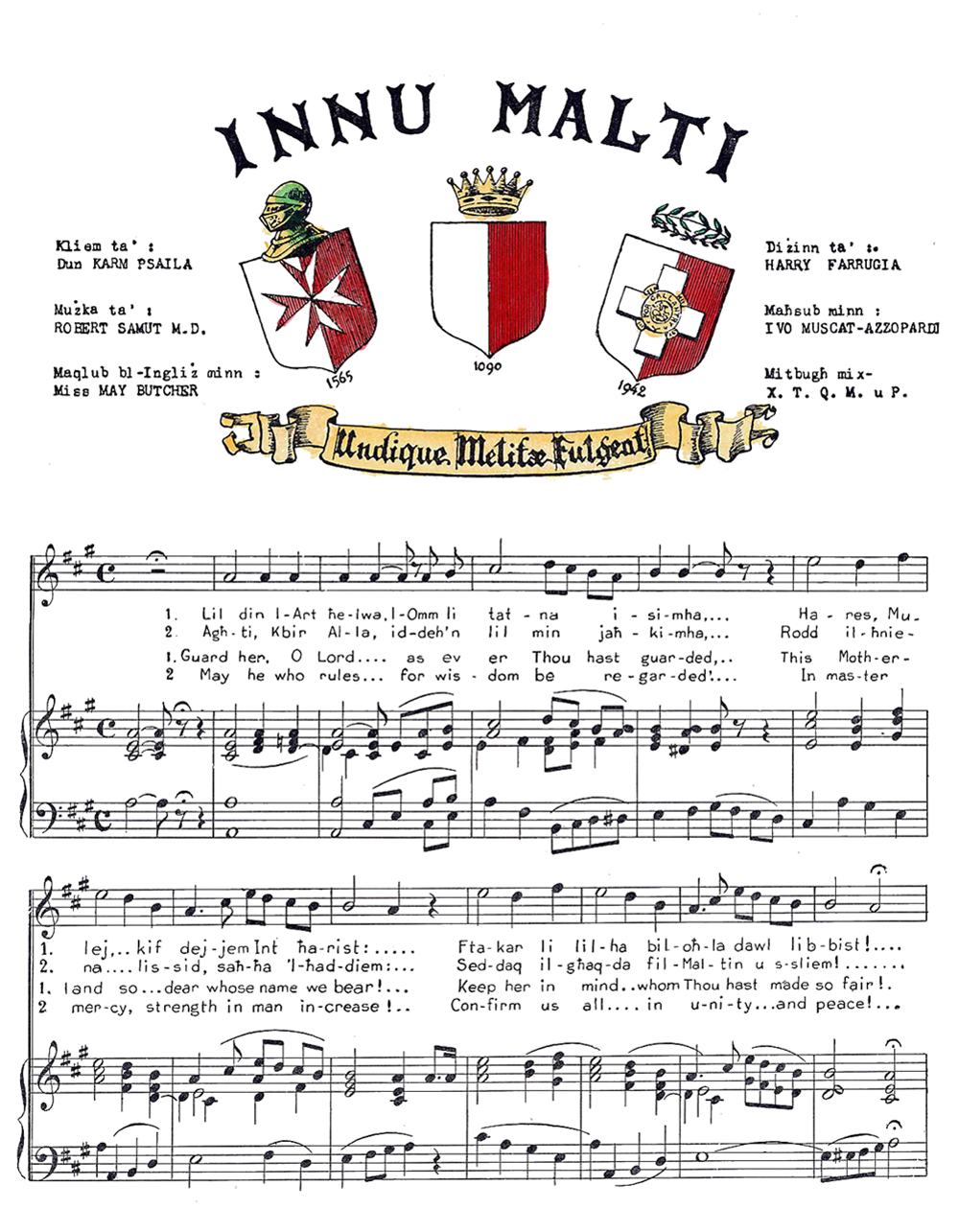
- National anthem of Malta
- Lyrics: Dun Karm Psaila, 1922
- Music: Robert Samut, 1922
- Adopted: 1964

Audio sample
- Old official orchestral instrumental recording in F major: file; help

"L-Innu Malti" ('The Maltese Hymn') is the national anthem of Malta. It was written in the form of a prayer to God. Officially adopted in 1964 upon independence from the United Kingdom, the music was composed by Robert Samut, and the lyrics were written by Dun Karm Psaila.

== History ==
Between the mid-19th century and the early 1930s, Malta was passing through a national awakening. With the increased national awareness, it was felt by many thinkers that Malta should have its own national anthem. In 1850, Ġan Anton Vassallo composed "Innu Lil Malta", which used to be played during many Maltese political manifestations and meetings. In 1922, Robert Samut composed a short melody. A year later, A.V. Laferla, director of primary schools in Malta, obtained possession of this composition, as he wanted to have an anthem that could be sung by students in Malta's schools. Laferla asked Dun Karm to write lyrics that would fit with Samut's short melody. The poems of Dun Karm Psaila are well known for their religious and patriotic currents, and so are the verses written for Samut's anthem. The hymn was already being sung in December 1922, mostly in governmental schools. The first time it was heard in public was on 27 December 1922 and again on 6 January 1923, during two concerts at the Manoel Theatre. However, during its two first appearances, someone had changed some verses from the first stanza. This angered Dun Karm, who protested by writing an article in a local newspaper. Since then, the lyrics have remained unchanged. On 3 February 1923, another concert was held at the Manoel Theatre, performed by children from Sliema, with Dun Karm's original verses. The hymn was played by the Duke of Edinburgh's Band, of Vittoriosa.

The Maltese government declared the anthem as the official Maltese anthem on 22 February 1941. In 1942, it was printed for Piano e canto with an English translation by May Butcher. This publication helped spread its popularity. The 1964 Independence Constitution confirmed it as the national anthem of Malta, which is today one of the symbols of Maltese identity.

On 25 March 1945, in the Gżira Stadium, a football match was held between a Malta XI and Hajduk Split, a team from Yugoslavia. At that time, Malta was still under British rule, and Edmond Schreiber, the British governor, was present. Before the game, the band played the anthem of Yugoslavia, "Hey, Slavs", and then it played that of the United Kingdom, "God Save the King", due to Malta's status as a colony. As the governor was about to sit, the attendees in the stadium stood up and sang the Maltese anthem. The governor, albeit embarrassed, stood up as well until the end of the anthem.

The anthem is played during all the official duties of the President of Malta, the Prime Minister of Malta and other important governmental personalities. It is played during all important national activities.

== Lyrics ==
Maltese original

Lil din l-art ħelwa, l-Omm li tatna isimha,
Ħares, Mulej, kif dejjem Int ħarist:
Ftakar li lilha bil-oħla dawl libbist.

Agħti, kbir Alla, id-dehen lil min jaħkimha,
Rodd il-ħniena lis-sid, saħħa 'l-ħaddiem:
Seddaq il-għaqda fil-Maltin u s-sliem.

Arabic equivalent

،لذين الأرض حِلوة، الأم اللي عطتنا اسمها
حارس، مولاي، كيف دايم أنت حرست
فتكر لي لِيلْها بالأُحلى ضَوْل لبّست

،عطي، كبير الله، الذهن لِلْمِنْ يَحكمها
رُد الحنانة للسيد، صحَّة للخدَّام
صدَق العَقدة في المالطين والسلام

IPA transcription (Note: See Help:IPA/Maltese, Maltese language § Orthography and Maltese language § Phonology.)

[lɪl diːn lɐɹt ħɛl.wɐ lɔmː lɪ tɐt.nɐ ɪ.sɪ.mɐ |]
[ħɐː.rɛs mʊ.lɛj kiːv‿dɛj.jɛm ɪnt ħɐ.rɪst |]
[ftɐ.kɐɹ lɪ liː.lɐ bɪl.ɔħ.lɐ daʊ̯l lɪb.bɪst ‖]

[ɐ(ˤ).tiː gbiːr ɐl.lɐ ɪd.dɛːn lɪl miːn jɐħ.kɪ.mɐ |]
[rɔdː ɪl.ħnɪː.nɐ lɪs.siːd (ɪs.)sɐħ.ħɐ lɪl.ħɐd.dɪːm |]
[sɛd.dɐʔ ɪl.ɐ(ˤ)ʔ.dɐ fɪl.mɐl.tiːn ʊ ɪs.slɪːm ‖]

Poetic English translation by René Micallef

Guard, Lord, forever, as you've done erst and ceasing never,
This land whose name we received, our motherly-named Mother.
Her you have draped with a light whose grace exceeds all other.

On those who govern, sovereign God, bestow understanding,
Grant wellness to those who work, largesse to those employing,
Make firm, make just all our bonds, the peace we are enjoying.

English translation by May Butcher

Guard her, o Lord, as ever Thou hast guarded!
This Motherland so dear whose name we bear!
Keep her in mind, whom Thou hast made so fair!

May he who rules, for wisdom be regarded!
In master mercy, strength in man increase!
Confirm us all, in unity and peace!

Literal English translation by Peter Streich

This sweet land, the Mother that gave us her name,
Protect (her), Lord, as always You protected (her):
Remember that her (You) clothed with the sweetest light.

Give, great God, discernment to (those) who rule her,
Return mercy to the owner, health to the worker:
Render righteous the unity in the Maltese and the peace.
