= St Publius Parish Church =

- Knisja Arċipretali ta' San Publiju
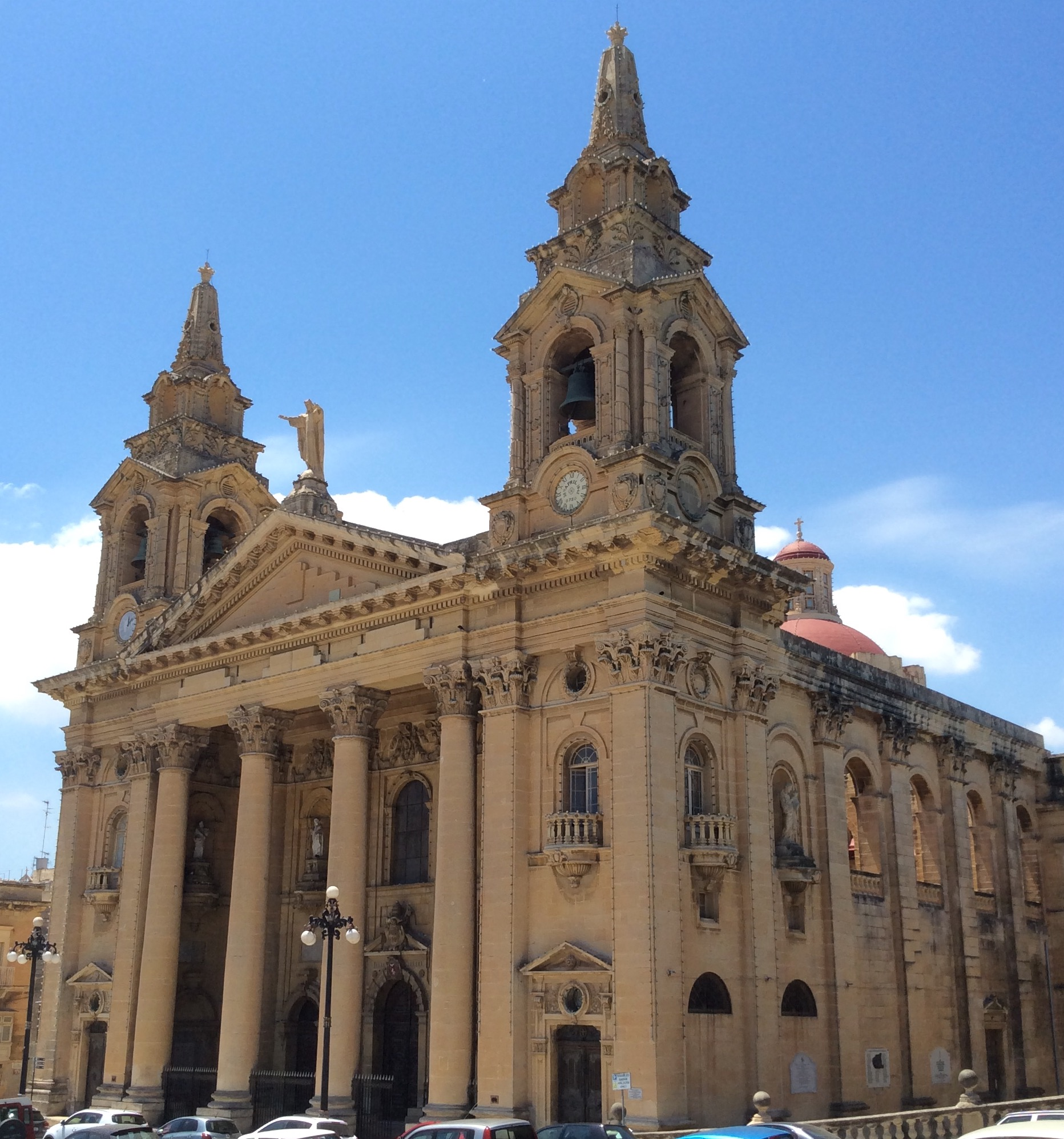
- View of the Church of St. Publius
- St Publius Parish Church
- 35°53′32.8″N 14°30′17.4″E
- Location: Floriana
- Country: Malta
- Denomination: Roman Catholic
- Website: www.florianaparish.org

History
- Status: Parish church
- Dedication: Saint Publius
- Consecrated: 20 March 1792

Architecture
- Functional status: Active
- Architect: Francesco Marandon (original design)
- Style: Neoclassical
- Years built: 1733–1768; 1771–1792; 1856–1861; 1884–1892; 1944–1950s
- Groundbreaking: 2 August 1733
- Completed: 19 January 1768

Specifications
- Length: 164 feet (50 m)
- Width: 106 feet (32 m)
- Materials: Limestone

The Saint Publius Parish Church (Maltese: Knisja Arċipretali ta' San Publiju), also known as the Floriana Parish Church (Maltese: Knisja Parrokkjali tal-Furjana) is a Roman Catholic parish church in Floriana, Malta, dedicated to Saint Publius. It was constructed at several stages between the 18th and 20th centuries.

== History ==
The first stone of the Church of St Publius was laid down on 2 August 1733 by Bishop Paul Alphéran de Bussan, in the presence of Grand Master António Manoel de Vilhena. The sacristy was completed seven years later and it began to be used as a small church by the inhabitants of the then newly built suburb of Floriana. Construction was complete by 17 January 1768, when the relic of Saint Publius was brought to the church. The original design of the church is attributed to Francesco Marandon. The church was originally part of the parish of St Paul of Valletta.

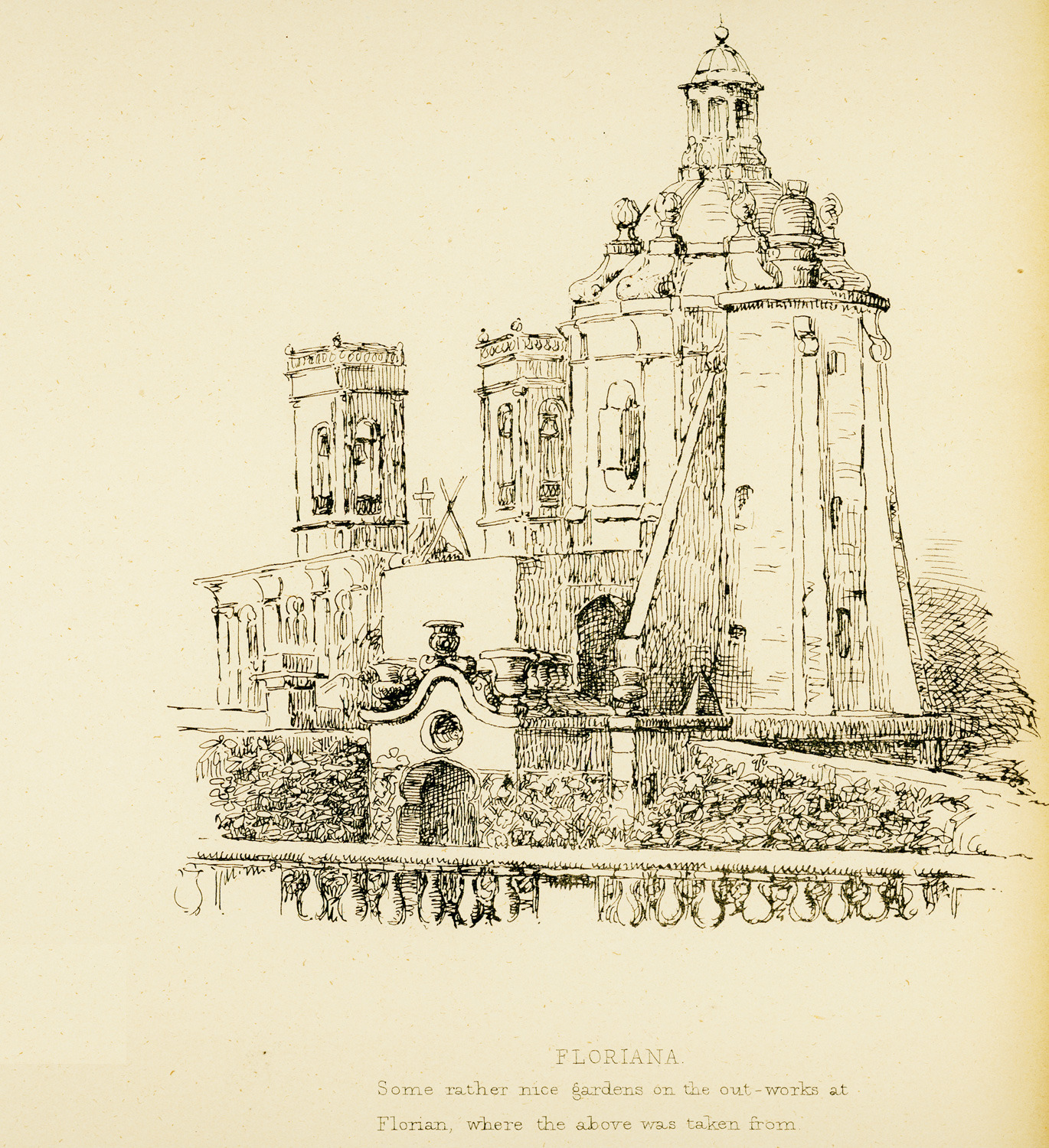
Drawing of the old church of Floriana as viewed from the rear in the 1850s

The façade of the church began to be rebuilt in 1771, and the dome was constructed in 1780. It became a vice-parish in 1776, and the church was consecrated by Bishop Vincenzo Labini on 20 March 1792. It became a parish in March 1844, after a decree was issued by Pope Gregory XVI.

The naves and an oratory were constructed between 1856 and 1861. A new façade was built by Nicola Zammit between 1884 and 1890. Two new bell towers were also built in 1889 and 1892. The church's interior was embellished in the late 19th and early 20th centuries.

Part of the church's façade and its dome were destroyed by aerial bombardment during World War II, when it was hit by bombs on 3–4 March and 28 April 1942 and sixteen people were killed. The nearby Sarria Church became a temporary parish church until the Church of St Publius was reopened on 10 December 1944. Reconstruction of the church was carried out by the architect Gustav Vincenti, and it was completed in the late 1950s. The interior was embellished in the following decades, being fully completed in the early 1990s.

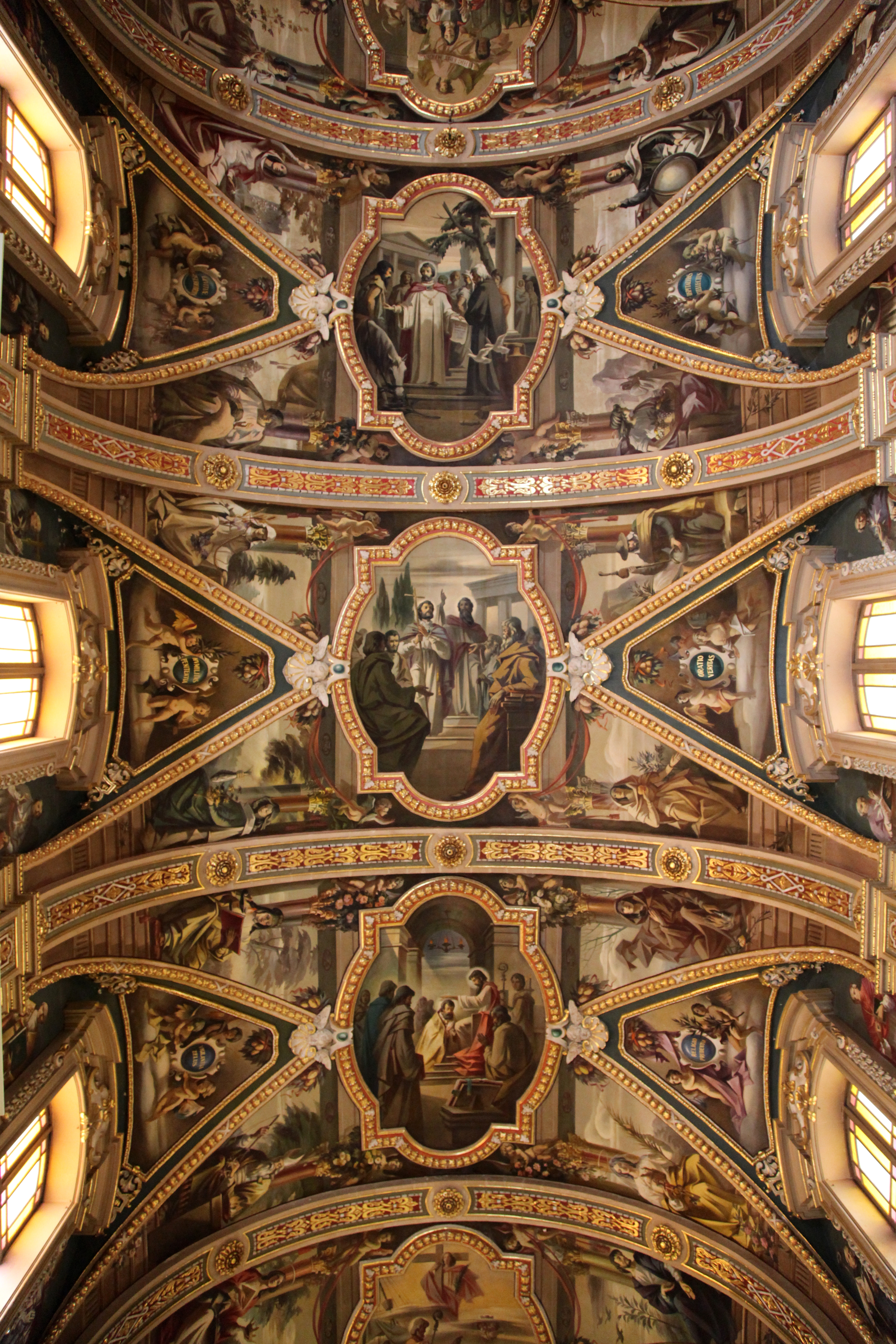
Ceiling frescoes

The church is scheduled as a Grade 1 national monument, and it is also listed on the National Inventory of the Cultural Property of the Maltese Islands.

== Parish priest and Archpriest ==
Since 1721, when the people of Floriana requested that the Parish Priest of St Paul’s in Valletta provide them with a more conveniently located church to replace the Church of Our Lady of Sorrows in Tal-Pietà, which stood outside the city’s fortifications, Floriana has had 25 different spiritual leaders, including the current Archpriest.

These spiritual leaders were known as Vice-Parish Priests (Vicendarji) until Floriana was established as a parish, Parish Priests (Kappillani) until the parish was elevated to an archpriestly parish, and Archpriests (Arċiprieti) thereafter, a title that continues to be used to this day.

NO.	NAME	POSITION	BEGINNING	END	BIRTH LOCATION	NOTES
I	Dun Gian-Patist Seguna	Vice-Parish Priests	1721	1740	Valletta	During the time of Dun Gian-Patist as Vicendarju, the Bishop Paul Alphéran de Bussan blessed the foundation stone of the new church in the presence of Grand Master Vilhena (1733).
II	Kanonku Pascal Grima	Vice-Parish Priests	1740	1749	Gozo	
III	Dun Guzepp Zahra	Vice-Parish Priests	1749	1768	Floriana	
IV	Kanonku Pietru Pawl Muscat	Vice-Parish Priests	1768	1773	Valletta	During his tenure, the titular altarpiece dedicated to St Publius was produced. It was begun by the French painter Antoine de Favray and completed by his student, Filippo Vincenzo Pace.
V	Kanonku Carmelo Borg	Vice-Parish Priests	1773	1775	Valletta	
VI	Kanonku Gian-Patist Falzon	Vice-Parish Priests	1775	1796	Floriana	During his tenure, The church was solemnly consecrated by Bishop Vincenzo Labini on 28th March 1792.
VII	Dun Ferdinando Camilleri	Vice-Parish Priests	1796	1813	Mosta	During his tenure, in 1811 the titular statue of St Publius was commissioned and entrusted to the sculptor Vincenzo Bugeja, who created the statue that remains the titular statue of Floriana to this day.
VIII	Dun Salv Zammit	Vice-Parish Priests	1813	1820	Zurrieq	
IX	Dun Publio Farrugia	Vice-Parish Priests	1820	1845	Floriana	During his tenure, the Confraternity of St Publius was established on 12 January 1834, On 5 March 1844, Floriana was formally established as a parish with all the rights and privileges pertaining to a parish. Later that same year, in 1844, the first antiphon was composed by the music director Vincenzo Bugeja, contributing to the development of the musical tradition associated with the devotion to St Publius in Floriana.
1	Dun Guzepp Ellul	First Parish Priest	October 1844	1848	Floriana	He Was the First Parish Priest of the newly erected Floriana parish.
2	Dun Ġann-Anton Vidal	Parish Priest	1848	1867	Vittoriosa	He is the second parish priest of Floriana. By January 1867, however, ill health prevented him from continuing to administer the sacraments, and Dun Manwel Borg took over the duties as Vicar Curate.
3	Dun Salv Gaffiero	First Archpriest	22 February 1868	1876	Senglea	Appointed on 18 February 1868 and formally took possession on 22 February 1868. He became the third parish priest. In 1869, the parish of Floriana was elevated to the rank of an archpriestly parish. Following this elevation, he became the first Archpriest of Floriana, marking an important step in the development and status of the parish.
4	Dun Pawl Lauron	Archpriest	4th January 1876	1887	Birkirkara	During his period as Archpriest, he was responsible for the construction of the new façade of the Parish Church of Floriana, which was designed by the architect Nicola Zammit.
5	Dun Andrea Dingli	Archpriest	1887	17th December 1896	Balzan	He served as Archpriest until his sudden death on 17th December 1896
6	Dun Frangisk Mallia (il-mulej)	Archpriest	20th April 1897	12th April 1931	Cospicua	During his tenure as Archpriest, he undertook major works to beautify and improve the church, including the installation of electricity, the decoration and painting of the ceiling and dome, marble paving, and the decoration and gilding of the chapels. He also introduced new altars, vestments, furnishings, statues, chandeliers and other works of art, many of which were unfortunately destroyed when the church was severely damaged during the Second World War.
7	Dun Angelo Ghigo	Archpriest	1931	1952	Mqabba	He was Archpriest during the Second World War and witnessed the destruction of the Parish Church of Floriana on 28 April 1942. He was also involved in the efforts to rebuild and restore the church in the years that followed.
8	Dun Anton Debono	Archpriest	1953	6th August 1959	Naxxar	He served as Archpriest during the post-war reconstruction of the Parish Church of Floriana, overseeing its rebuilding and embellishment. He was present in 1956 when the statue of Christ the King was placed on the church façade. while in Rome, he died suddenly on 6 August 1959, while still serving as Archpriest.
9	Dun Carmelo Xuereb	Archpriest	January 1960	1967	Victoria Gozo	During his tenure as Archpriest, Dun Carmelo Xuereb continued to embellish the church, commissioning four new marble altars, a marble chapel for Our Lady of Sorrows, a baptistery, and the gilding of the organ gallery and other furnishings. He also began the church’s decoration and painting, oversaw the installation of the stained-glass window above the organ, and built the Youth Centre.
10	Dun Alwig Debono	Archpriest	1967	22nd March 1970	Victoria Gozo	Dun Alwig Debono was deeply loved by the people of Floriana, having lived in the community from the age of seven and becoming one of its own. Before becoming Archpriest, he had served for many years as Vice-Parish Priest and, during the vacancy of the parish, as Vicar Curate; as Archpriest, he began the decoration of the church, including the painting of the nave ceiling, but his work was cut short by his sudden death. His funeral was remembered for many years as a remarkable expression of the affection the Floriana community had for him.
11	Dun Salv Fenech	Archpriest	5th July 1970	January 1986	Floriana	During his tenure as Archpriest, Dun Salv Fenech continued the church’s restoration and embellishment, including restoring paintings and the altar of St Paul, gilding the baldachin, candlesticks and Apostles, replacing the main altar (the seconda) with marble, and acquiring a new organ. He also oversaw the decoration and gilding of the church and dome, the restoration of the outdoor furnishings, and the transformation of the former undercroft into St Publius Hall; during his tenure, two bombs damaged the Parish House.
12	Dun Kalcidon Vassallo	Archpriest	22nd february 1986	15th December 1991	Siggiewi	He was deeply loved by the people of Floriana and was always close to the community. As Archpriest, he established the tradition of a New Year’s Day lunch, bringing together those who were alone to celebrate the day as one community.
13	Dun Guzepp Pace	Archpriest	19th January 1992	21st November 1998	Marsa	During his tenure as Archpriest, Mons. Guzepp Pace carried out extensive pastoral and restoration work, including the inauguration of the new niche of Saint Publius in 1994 and the beginning of the devotional pilgrimage of Our Lady of Sorrows. He restored the marble altar of Saint Lawrence and several paintings, decorated and gilded the Chapel of St Joseph, restored the church ceilings and apse paintings, and the statue of Our Lady of Doctrine. He also carried out maintenance on the roofs and sacristy and oversaw the restoration of the historic arch. He was known for his pastoral work and his dedication to people on the margins of society.
14	Dun Lawrenz Zammit	Archpriest	19th December 1998	3rd November 2001	Qormi	During his tenure as Archpriest, Dun Lawrenz carried out extensive maintenance and restoration works, including the restoration of paintings, sacristy furnishings and the church’s liturgical decorations, as well as the restoration of the historic St Publius arch. He improved the parish’s financial and administrative affairs, began preparations for the church’s decoration, planned a new altar and worked on the renovation of the Parish House, which had been declared uninhabitable. On 3 November 2001, he announced his departure as Archpriest at the request of Archbishop Joseph Mercieca, following difficulties with some parish volunteers and repeated threats that had made it difficult for him to carry out his pastoral duties, and he was appointed to new responsibilities within the Archdiocese.
15	Dun Richard Borg	Archpriest	17th March 2002	11th March 2018	Naxxar	During his tenure as Archpriest, he commissioned and oversaw the restoration of several paintings. He also commissioned the Gozitan artist Mr John Grima to paint the ceilings of the Chapel of Our Lady of the Rosary and the Chapel of the Crucifixion.
16	Dun Charles Cini	Archpriest	11th April 2018	present	Qormi	

== Architecture ==
The façade of the Church of St Publius consists of a neoclassical portico topped by a triangular pediment, flanked by a bell tower on either side. A statue of Christ the King stands on the top of the façade. The church has a cruciform plan with a dome and a richly decorated interior.

The altarpiece showing the martyrdom of Publius dates back to 1773, and it is the work of Antoine de Favray and his pupil Filippo Vincenzo Pace. The ceiling is decorated by paintings depicting Saint Paul's shipwreck and his stay in Malta. Several other paintings are also found in the church, including works by Giuseppe Calì, Emvin Cremona and many other artists.

The titular statue of St Publius was completed in 1811 by the sculptor Vincenzo Dimech.

== See also ==
- Culture of Malta
- History of Malta – Maltese history
- List of churches in Malta
- Religion in Malta
