= Saint Publius =

1st-century Maltese bishop and Christian saint

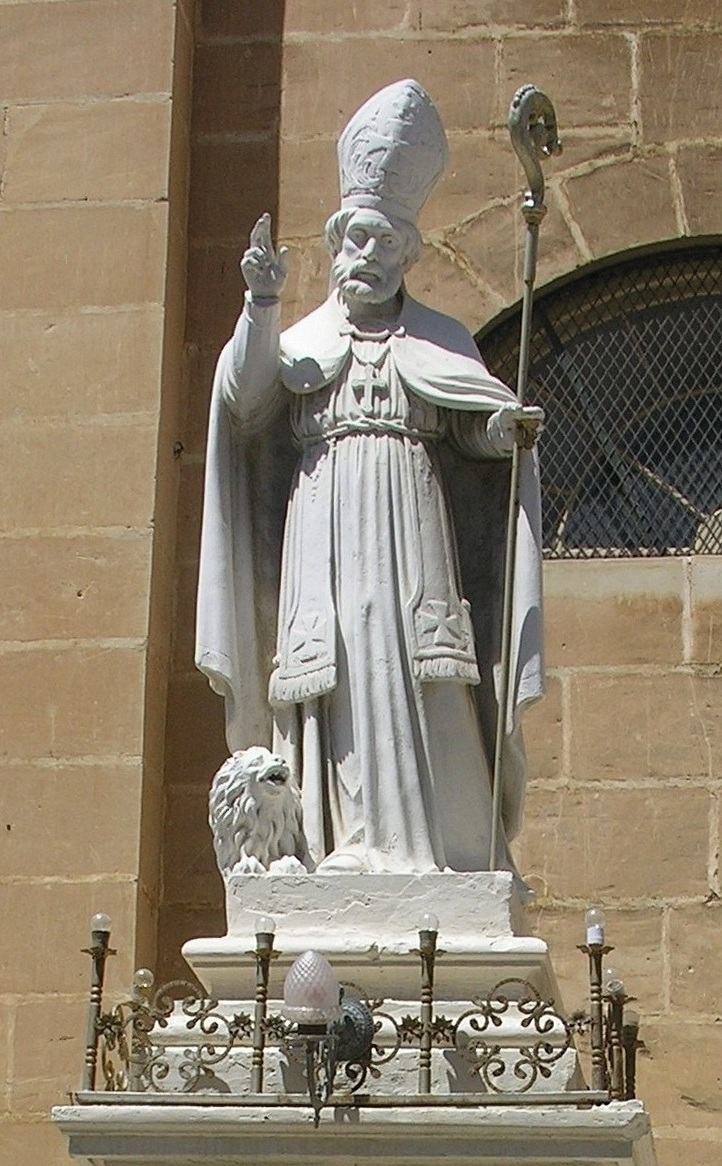
- Statue of Saint Publius next to the Floriana Parish Church, 1811, by Vincenzo Dimech

Bishop of Athens and Bishop of Malta Venerable Hieromartyr
- Died: c. 112; (Note: "+ c 112. Tradition identifies this saint with Publius, 'chief man of the island of Malta', who befriended St Paul after his shipwreck (Acts 28:7). He became the first Bishop of Malta and later Bishop of Athens, being martyred under Trajan.") or c. 125; or c. 161–180; Athens, Achaea, Roman Empire
- Venerated in: Catholic Church; Eastern Orthodox Church
- Feast: 22 January (Catholic); 13 March (Eastern Orthodox)
- Attributes: Shown with a lion next to him, episcopal vestments, crozier
- Patronage: Malta, Floriana; Athens, Greece

Saint Publius (Maltese: San Publiju; Ancient Greek: Πούπλιος), also known as Publius of Malta or Publius of Athens, was an early Christian bishop and saint. He is considered the first Bishop of Malta and one of the first Bishops of Athens.

Publius is Malta's first canonised saint, who is described in the Book of Acts as the 'chief' or prince of the island (Maltese: il-prinċep tal-gżira). According to Maltese Christian tradition, Publius' conversion led to Malta being the first Christian nation in the West.

He is venerated in the Catholic Church and Eastern Orthodox Church, with feast days on 22 January and 13 March respectively.

== History and tradition ==
According to Christian tradition, it was Publius who received Paul the Apostle during his shipwreck on the island as recounted in the Acts of the Apostles. According to the Acts of the Apostles, Paul cured Publius' dysentery-afflicted father.

"In the vicinity of that place were lands belonging to a man named Publius, the chief of the island. He welcomed us and received us cordially as his guests for three days. It so happened that the father of Publius was sick with a fever and dysentery. Paul visited him and, after praying, laid his hands on him and healed him. After this had taken place, the rest of the sick on the island came to Paul and were cured. They paid us great honor and when we eventually set sail they brought us the provisions we needed." — Acts 28:7–10, New American Bible

He was martyred around 125, during the persecution of Emperor Hadrian.

== Legacy ==
=== Veneration ===
His feast is celebrated on 22 January in the Catholic Church, which places him as the successor of Dionysius the Areopagite, dating his martyrdom to c. 112. (Note: "At Athens, the birthday of St. Publius, bishop, who, as successor of St. Denis the Areopagite, nobly governed the Church of Athens. No less celebrated for the lustre of his virtues than for the brilliancy of his learning, he was gloriously crowned for having borne testimony to Christ.")

Apart from being patron saint of Floriana, Publius is also one of the three patron saints of Malta, along with St. Paul the Apostle and St. Agatha of Sicily.

In the Eastern Orthodox Church, however, his feast day is observed on 13 March, and according to an epistle of Dionysius, Bishop of Corinth, he is placed as the successor of Narcissus of Athens, dating his martyrdom to the period of the persecution under Marcus Aurelius (r. 161–180).

=== Namesakes ===
Various streets in Malta are named after him, including in Sliema, Rabat, Mellieħa, Saint Paul's Bay, Naxxar and Floriana.

=== Cultural Reemergence ===
In a 2025 article, James Aaron Ellul quoted historian Giovanni Bonello who highlighted how Gregorio Xerri’s post-1565 poem Inno della Vittoria elevates Saint Publius as a distinctly Maltese symbol of victory, bypassing the traditional emphasis on foreign religious figures. Bonello argues that this literary recognition initiated a cultural reclamation of Saint Publius, previously underrepresented in devotional and liturgical contexts. The article further notes contemporary calls—particularly marking ~1900 years since his martyrdom—to re-embed him in Malta’s national and ecclesiastical memory.

== See also ==
- List of minor New Testament figures
- List of archbishops of Athens
- List of bishops of Malta

== Notes ==
Early Church titles
Preceded by Narcissus of Athens	Bishop of Athens c. 112 – c. 125	Succeeded by Quadratus of Athens
New creation	Bishop of Malta; 60–90	Succeeded by Quadratus of Malta
