= Floriana Lines =

Line of fortifications in Floriana, Malta

- Is-Swar tal-Furjana
- Floriana, Malta
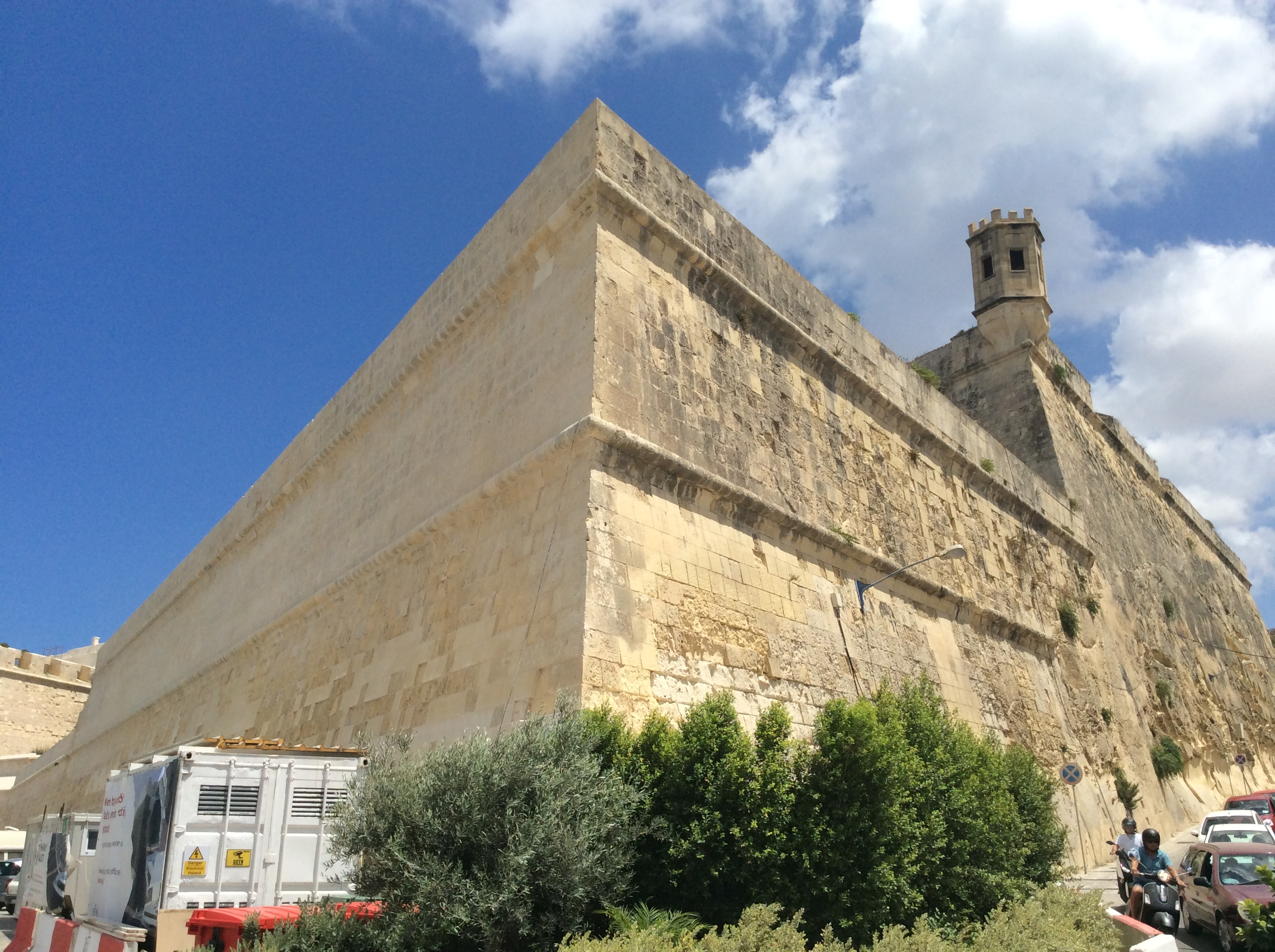
- San Salvatore Bastion and Counterguard

Site information
- Type: Line of fortifications
- Owner: Government of Malta
- Condition: Mostly intact

Location
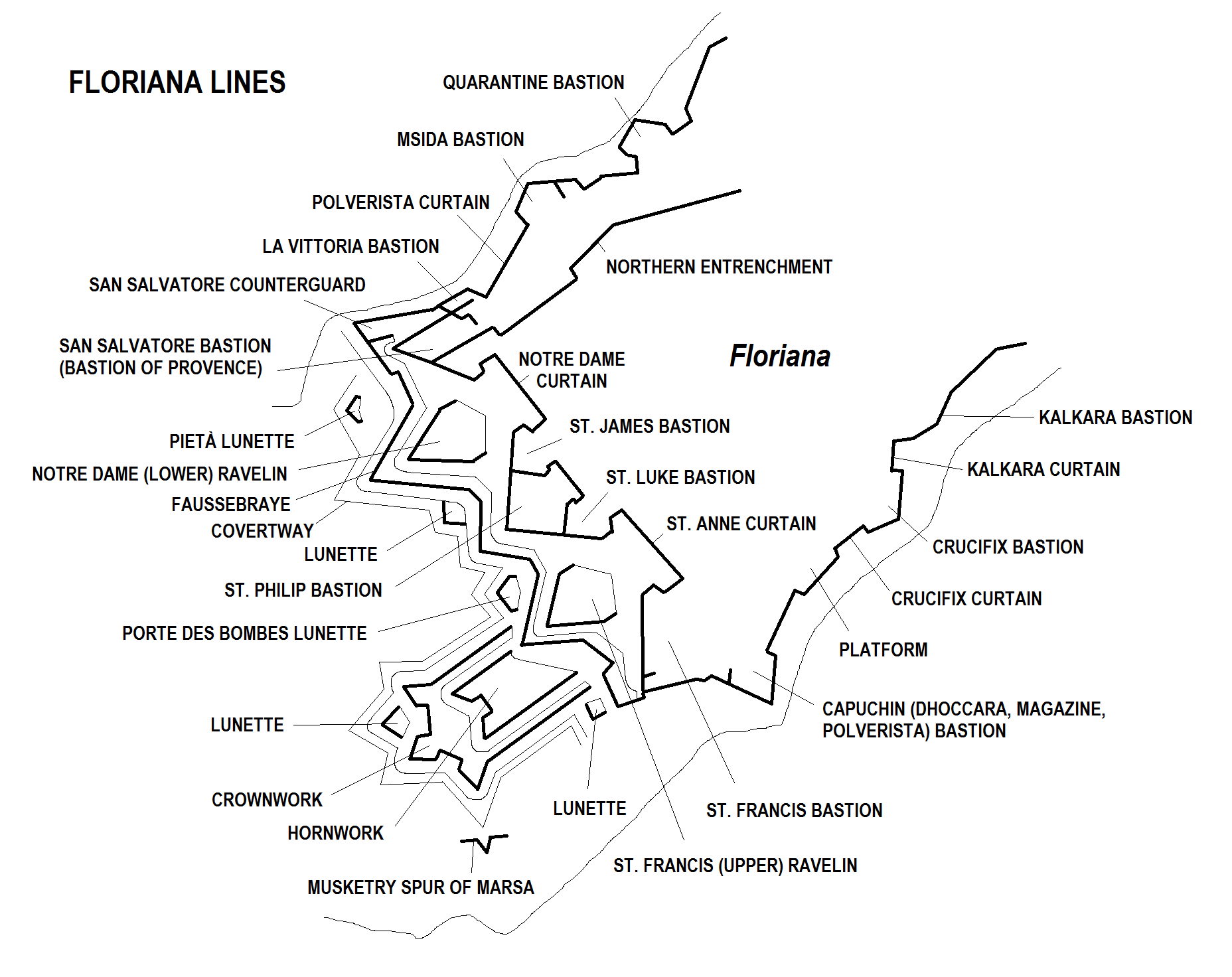
- Map of the Floriana Lines
- Location within Malta
- Coordinates: 35°53′26″N 14°30′8″E

Site history
- Built: 1636–18th century
- Built by: Order of Saint John
- In use: 1640–20th century
- Materials: Limestone
- Battles/wars: Siege of Malta (1798–1800)

The Floriana Lines (Maltese: Is-Swar tal-Furjana) are a line of fortifications in Floriana, Malta, which surround the fortifications of Valletta and form the capital city's outer defences. Construction of the lines began in 1636 and they were named after the military engineer who designed them, Pietro Paolo Floriani. The Floriana Lines were modified throughout the course of the 17th and 18th centuries, and they saw use during the French blockade of 1798–1800. Today, the fortifications are still largely intact but rather dilapidated and in need of restoration.

The Floriana Lines are considered to be among the most complicated and elaborate of the Hospitaller fortifications of Malta. Since 1998, they have been on the tentative list of UNESCO World Heritage Sites, as part of the Knights' Fortifications around the Harbours of Malta.

== History ==
=== Background, controversy and construction ===
The city of Valletta was founded on 28 March 1566 by Jean de Valette, the Grand Master of the Order of St. John. The city occupied about half the Sciberras Peninsula, a large promontory separating the Grand Harbour from Marsamxett Harbour, and was protected by tracce italiane fortifications, including a land front with four bastions, two cavaliers and a deep ditch. Although these fortifications were well designed, by the early 17th century they were not strong enough to resist a large attack due to new technological developments which increased the range of artillery.

In 1634, there were fears that the Ottomans would attack Malta. Grand Master Antoine de Paule asked Pope Urban VIII for help in improving the island's fortifications. The Pope sent Pietro Paolo Floriani to examine the defences, who in 1635 proposed building a second line of fortifications around the Valletta Land Front. Some members of the Order and a number of military engineers strongly opposed these plans, since the large garrison needed to man the lines was deemed too expensive. Eventually De Paule decided to construct the lines, since it would have been improper to disagree with the Pope's military engineer. The Bailiff Gattinara resigned from his post in the Commission of Fortifications in protest.

Work on the lines began in 1636, but no ceremony was carried out to commemorate laying the foundation stone due to controversy surrounding the construction. Since fortification was expensive, the new Grand Master Giovanni Paolo Lascaris imposed a new tax on immovable property. This tax created dispute between the Order and the clergy, who protested to the Pope. Some priests also influenced the population to take part in a national protest, but plans leaked out to authorities and the leaders were arrested.

The fortifications were named the Floriana Lines after their architect. By June 1640, the lines were considered partially defensible, although still incomplete.

=== Improvements and modifications ===
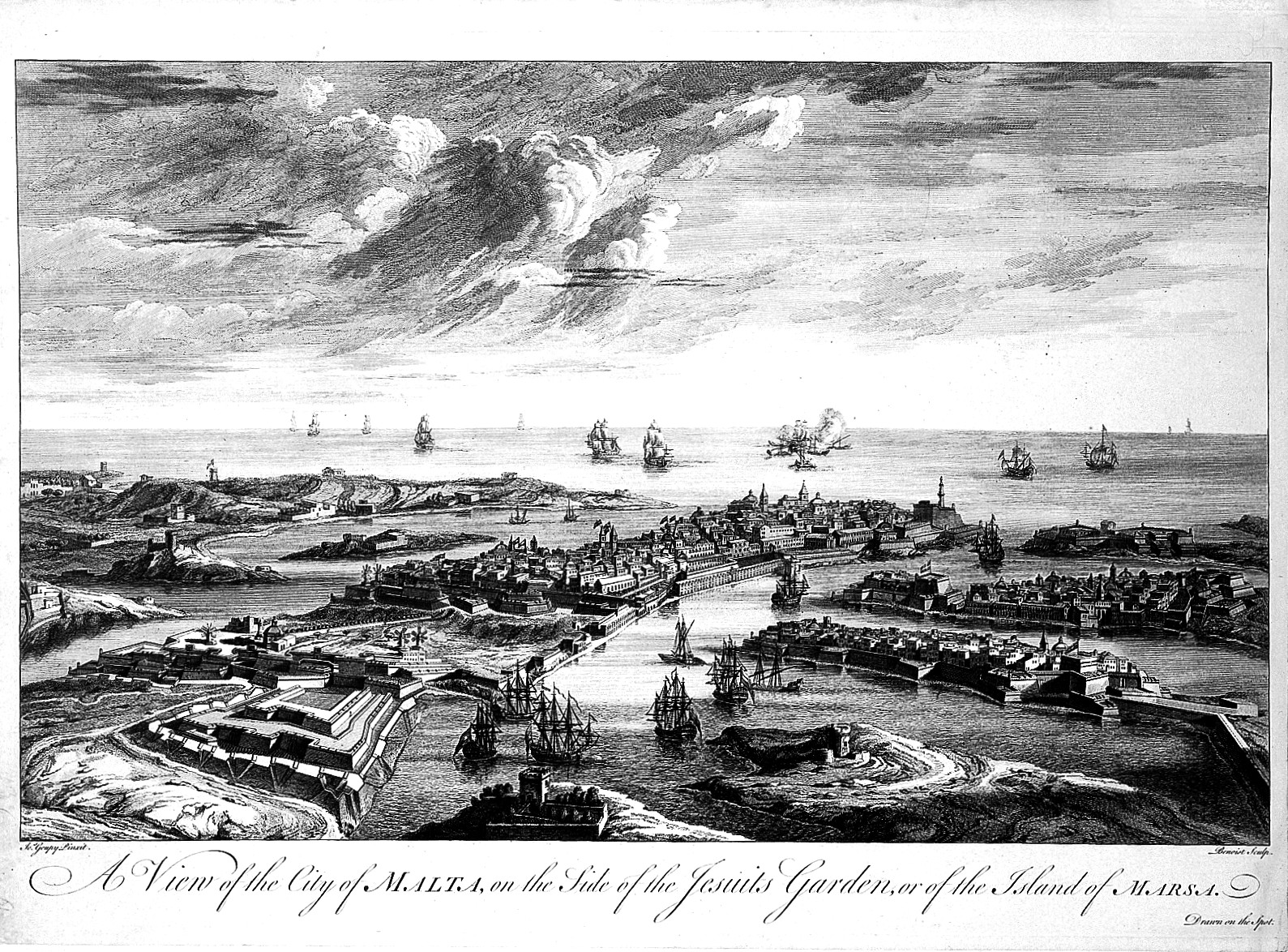
View of the Grand Harbour in c. 1725, with the Floriana Lines visible to the left

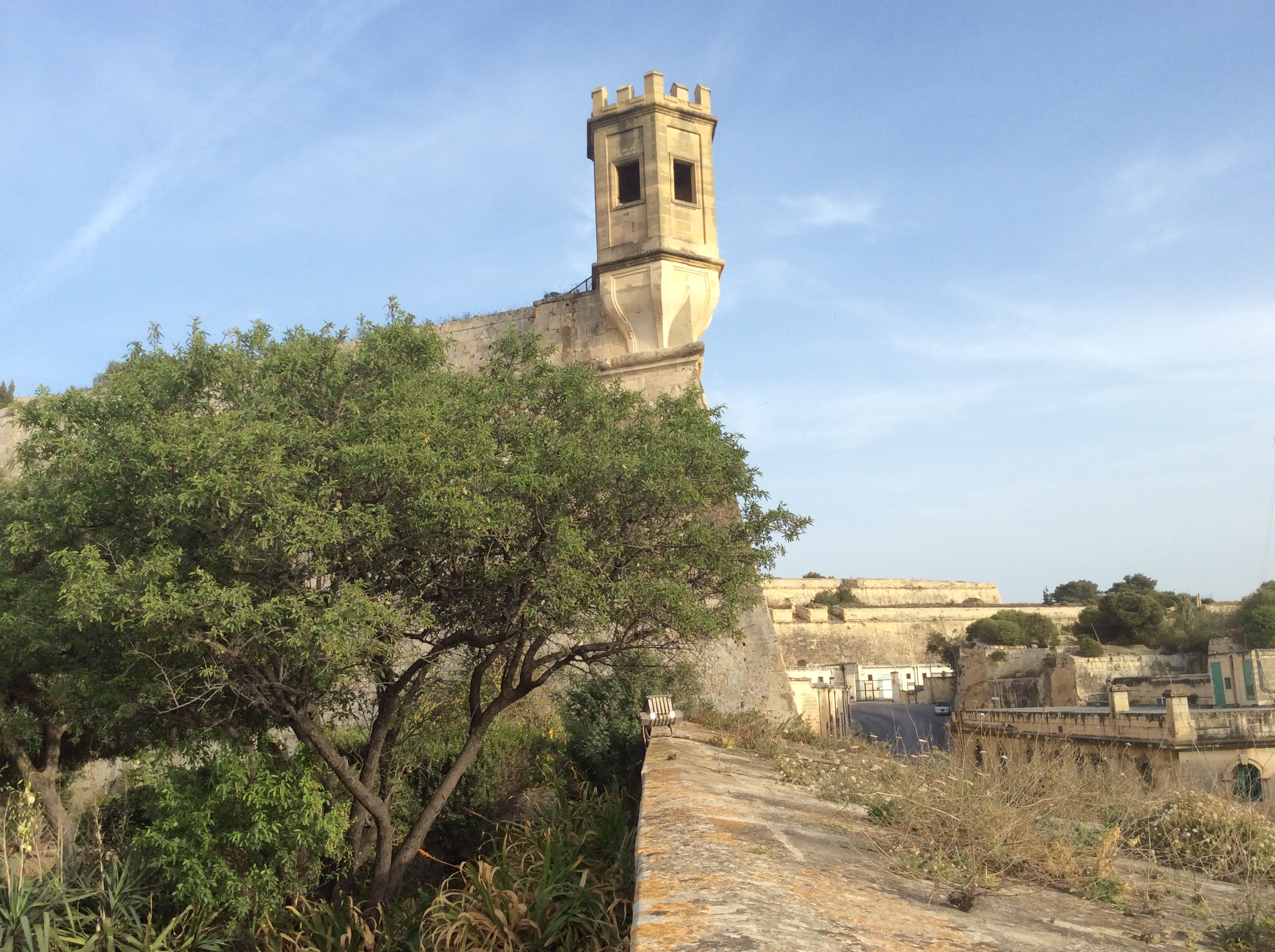
Floriana Lines as seen from Sa Maison Gardens

Fears of an Ottoman attack rose again after the fall of Candia in 1669, and the following year Grand Master Nicolas Cotoner invited the military engineer Antonio Maurizio Valperga to improve the fortifications. At the time the Floriana Lines were still under construction, and a number of weak points had been identified in their original design, especially since the demi-bastions forming the two extremities of the land front were too acute and could not be well defended. Valperga attempted to correct these flaws by making a number of alterations to San Salvatore Bastion on the western end of the lines, and constructing a faussebraye around the entire land front and a crowned hornwork near the eastern end. In the 1680s some minor modifications were made by the Flemish engineer Carlos de Grunenbergh.

Work on Valperga's modifications to the lines progressed slowly, and by the beginning of the 18th century the outworks, glacis and enceinte facing Marsamxett were still unfinished. Works continued under a number of other engineers, including Charles François de Mondion, and the lines were largely complete when Porte des Bombes was constructed in 1721. Further alterations were made over the following decades, such as the construction of the Northern Entrenchment in the 1730s.

In 1724, the suburb of Floriana was founded in the area between the Floriana Lines and the Valletta Land Front. The suburb was named Borgo Vilhena after Grand Master António Manoel de Vilhena, but it was commonly known as Floriana. It is now a town in its own right.

=== French occupation and British rule ===
French forces invaded Malta in June 1798, and the Order capitulated after a couple of days. The French occupied the island by September, when the Maltese rebelled and blockaded the French forces in the harbour area with foreign help. The Floriana Lines remained under French control throughout the blockade, and the Maltese built Tas-Samra Battery and a battery on Corradino in order to bombard them.

After the British took over Malta in 1800, the lines remained a functional military establishment. A number of minor alterations were made, including the enlargement of Porte des Bombes, the demolition of a lunette and some other gates, and the addition of gunpowder magazines and traverses.

=== Recent history ===
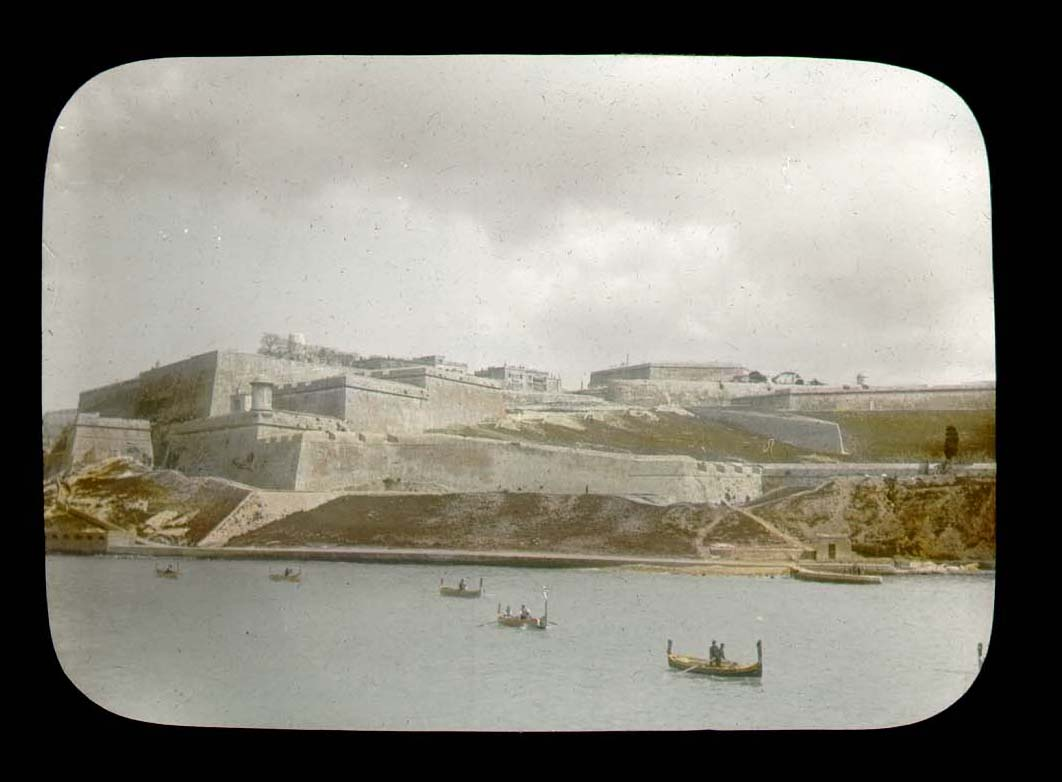
Section of the fortifications which was demolished and is now occupied by the Grand Hotel Excelsior

The fortifications were included on the Antiquities List of 1925, and they are now also listed on the National Inventory of the Cultural Property of the Maltese Islands.

In the 1970s, parts of the covertway and glacis were destroyed to make way for large storage tanks. Today, the lines are still more or less intact, but some parts are in a rather dilapidated state and in need of restoration.

== Layout ==
=== Land front ===
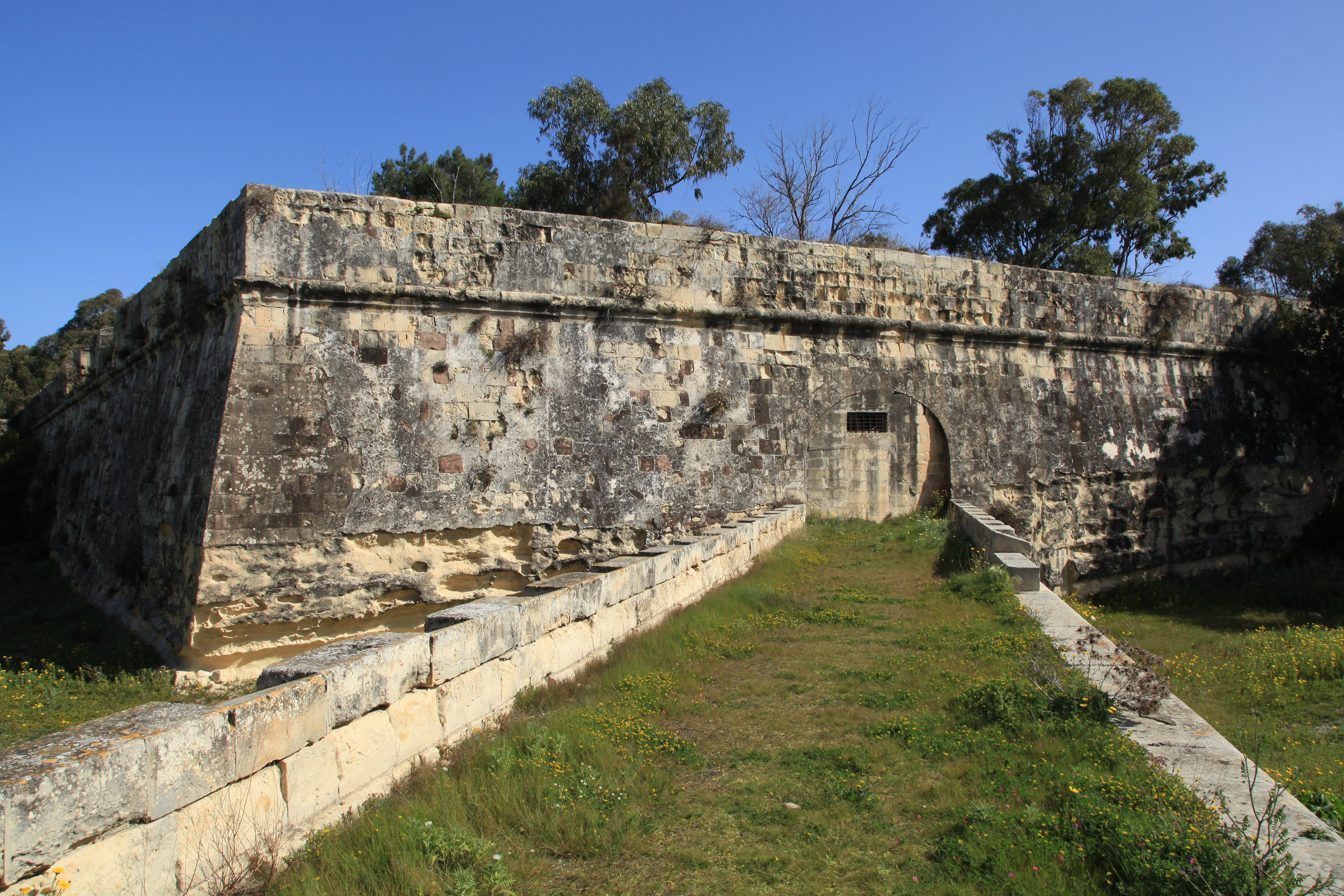
Faussebraye near St. Philip's Bastion

The Floriana Land Front is the large bastioned enceinte enclosing the landward approach to the Floriana. It consists of the following:

- Bastion of Provence, also known as San Salvatore Bastion or Sa Maison Bastion – a retrenched demi-bastion which was heavily altered over the course of the 17th and 18th centuries.
- Notre Dame Curtain – curtain wall linking San Salvatore and St. Philip Bastions. It contained the Notre Dame Gate, which was partially demolished in the 1920s to accommodate for traffic requirements.
- St. Philip Bastion – a large obtuse-angled bastion at the centre of the land front. It is retrenched with the following bastions:
  - St. James Bastion
  - St. Luke Bastion
- St. Anne Curtain – curtain wall linking St. Philip and St. Francis Bastions. It contained St. Anne's Gate, which was replaced by a larger gate in 1859. The larger gate was also demolished in 1897 to facilitate the flow of traffic.
- St. Francis Bastion – a large demi-bastion linked to the Polverista Bastion of the Grand Harbour enceinte. It is retrenched with St. Mark Bastion.

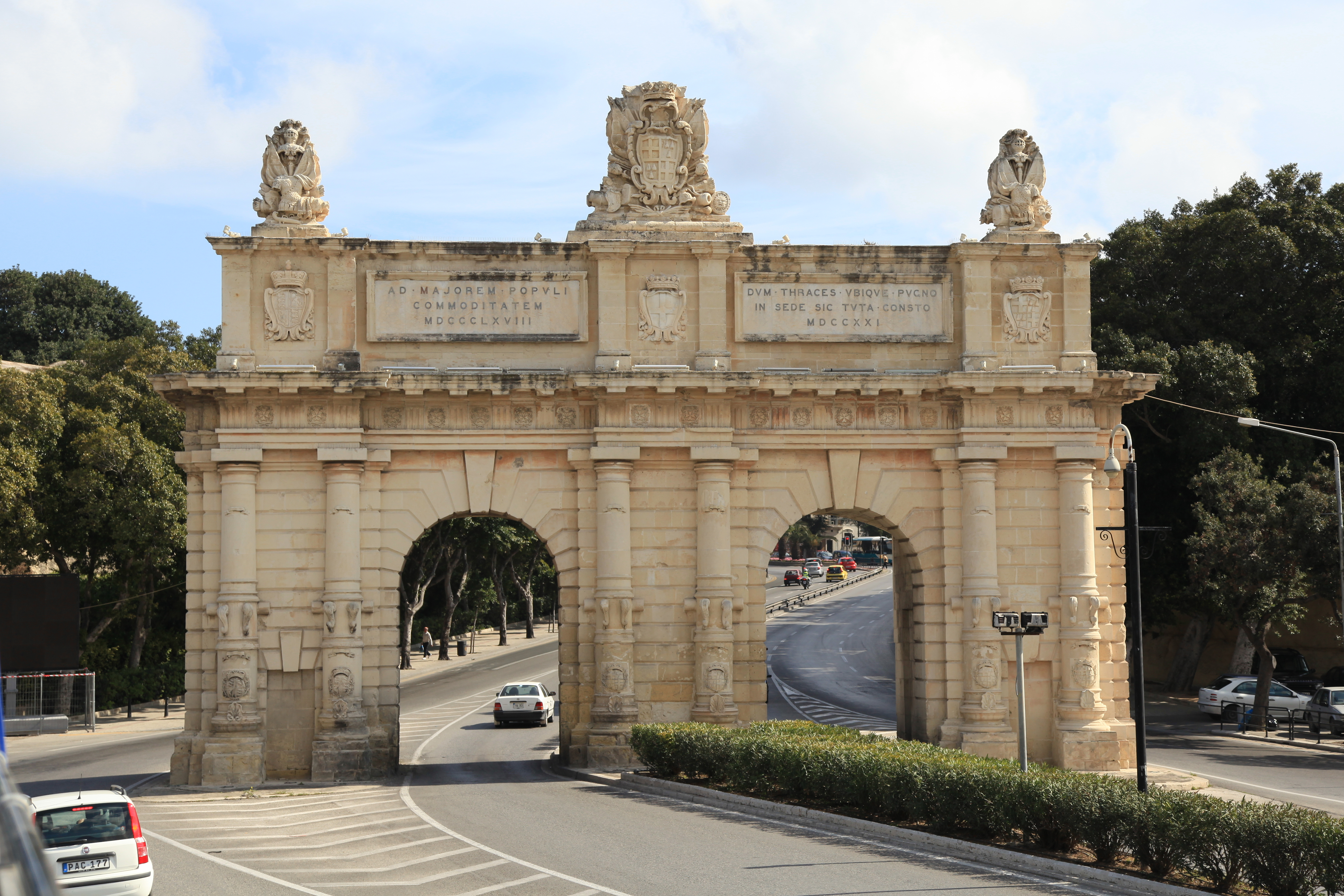
Porte des Bombes

The land front is surrounded by a ditch, which contains the following outworks:

- San Salvatore Counterguard – a counterguard near San Savatore Bastion.
- Pietà Lunette – a pentagonal lunette between San Salvatore Bastion and Notre Dame Ravelin, facing Pietà Creek. It was damaged by aerial bombardment in World War II.
- Notre Dame Ravelin, also known as the Lower Ravelin – a pentagonal ravelin near Notre Dame Curtain, between San Salvatore and St. Philip Bastions. A number of modern government buildings are located in the open area within the ravelin.
- a pentagonal lunette between Notre Dame Ravelin and St. Philip Bastion. It was damaged by aerial bombardment in World War II, but the damage was repaired.
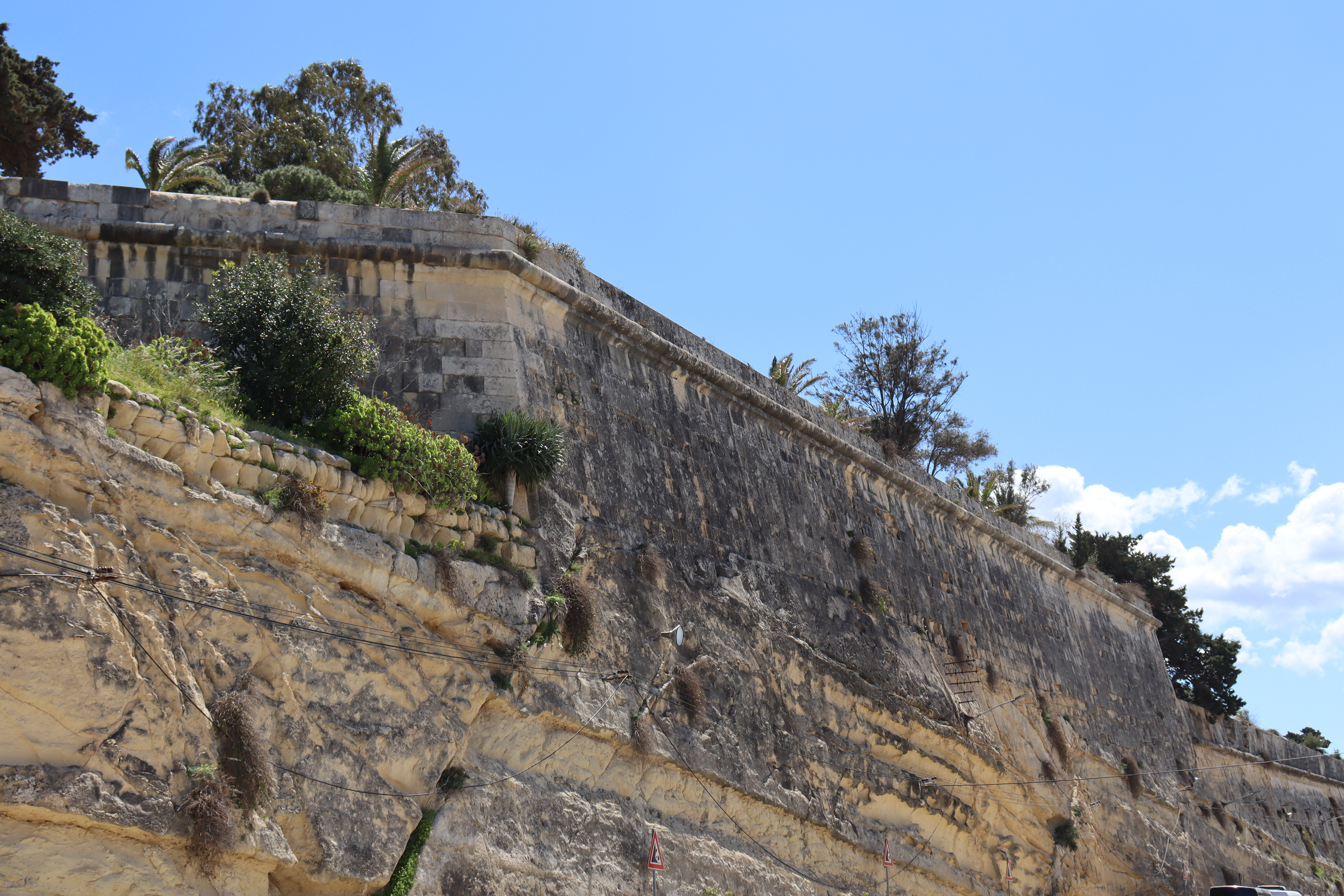
- The lines seen from nearby the Notre Dame Ravelin in 2026
  Porte des Bombes Lunette – a lunette between St. Philip Bastion and St. Francis Ravelin. It was demolished in the early 20th century to make way for the modern road to Valletta.
- St. Francis Ravelin, also known as the Upper Ravelin – a pentagonal ravelin near St. Anne Curtain, between St. Philip and St. Francis Bastions. The Malta Environment and Planning Authority (MEPA) offices are located in the open area within the ravelin.

The outworks are surrounded by a faussebraye, advanced ditch, covertway, and glacis. In the 1720s, a gate known as Porta dei Cannoni was built in the faussebraye. The gate was enlarged by the British, and became known as Porte des Bombes. It was eventually detached from the faussebraye to facilitate the flow of traffic, and it now looks like a triumphal arch.

A crowned hornwork consisting of an inner hornwork with two demi-bastions and an outer crownwork with one full bastion and two demi-bastions is located near St. Francis Ravelin. The crownwork was protected by a musketry gallery overlooking Marsa and by two lunettes, one near its land front and another near its flank.

=== Marsamxett enceinte ===
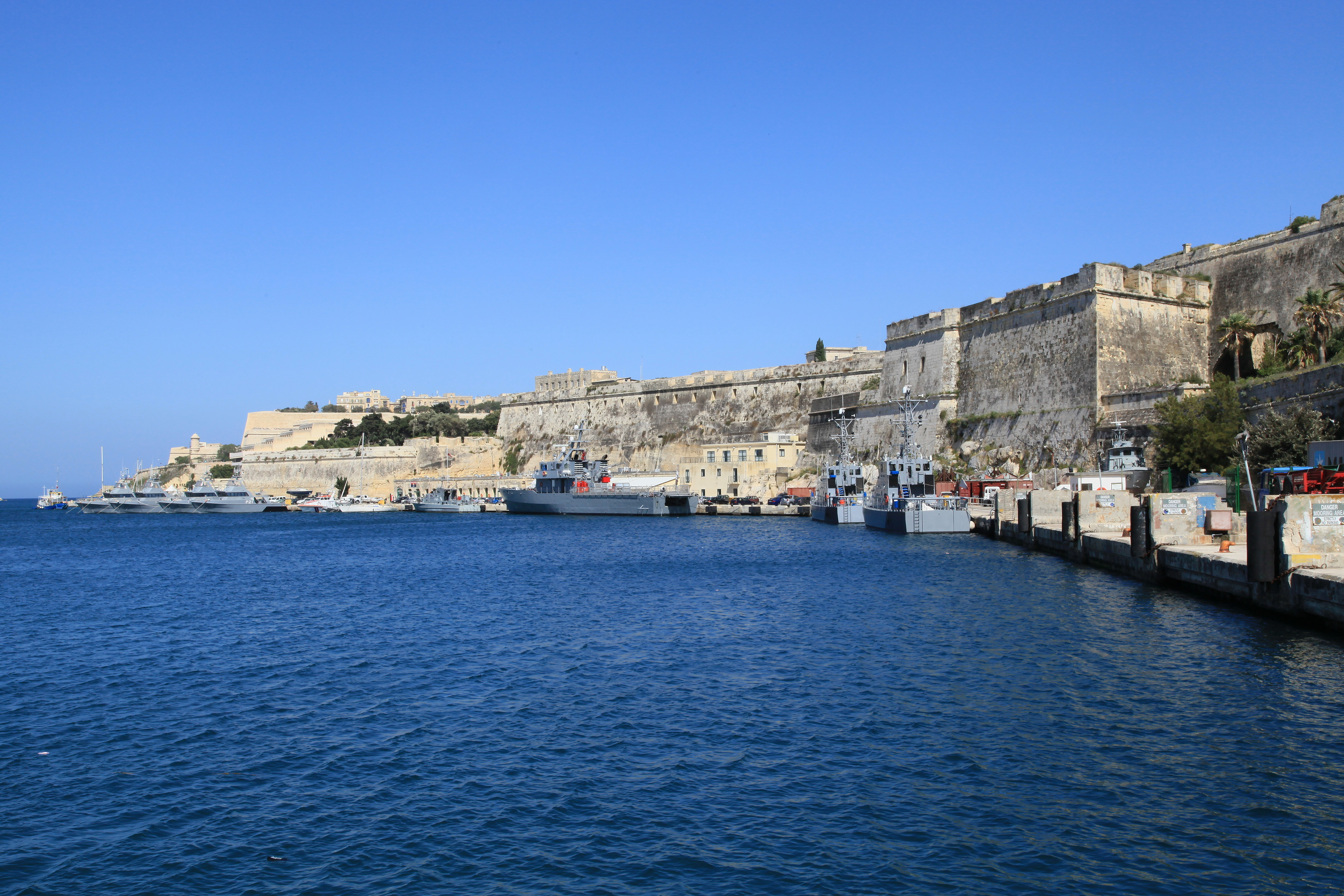
The enceinte along Marsamxett Harbour

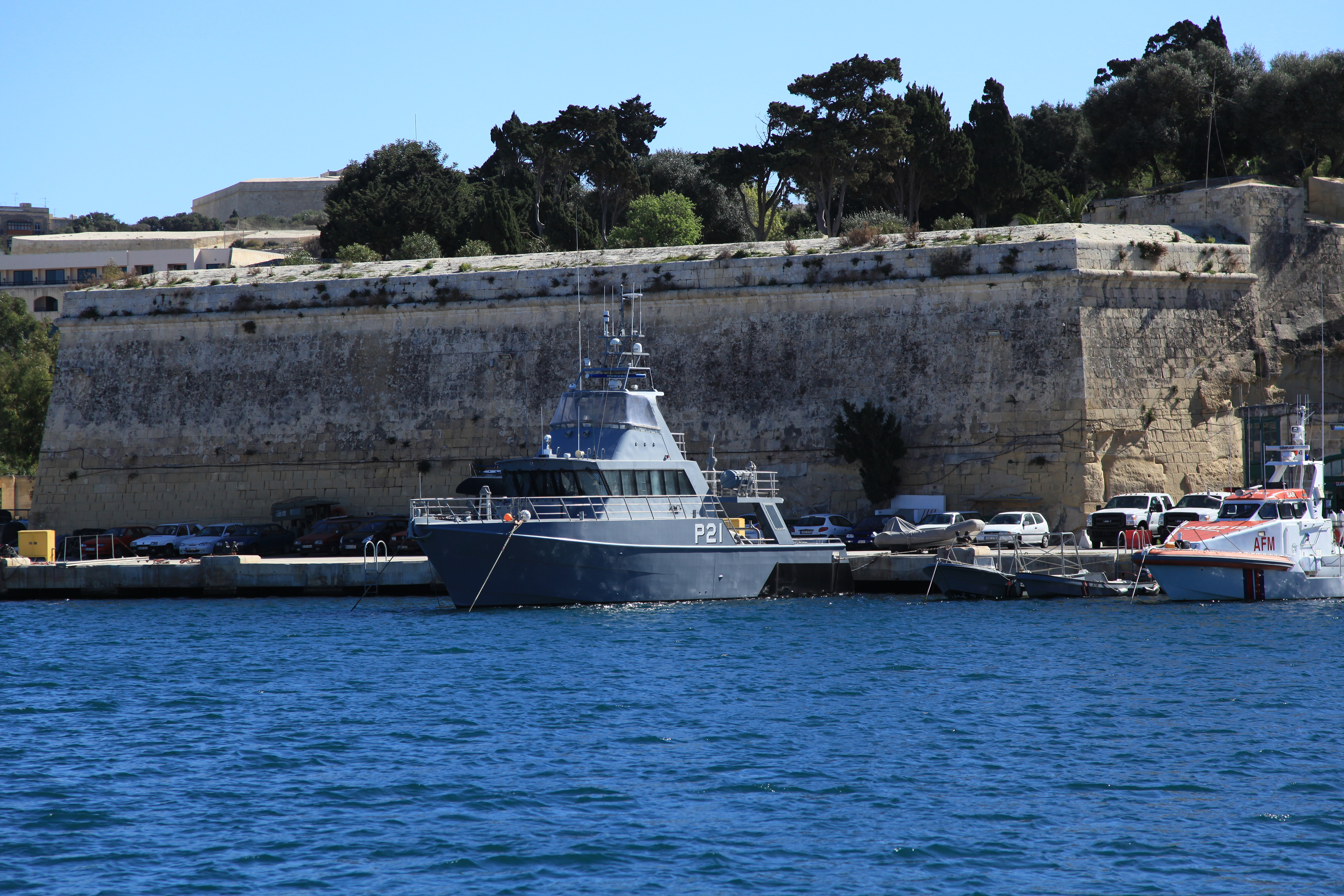
Msida Bastion

The enceinte along the side facing Marsamxett Harbour starts from San Salvatore Bastion of the Floriana Land Front, and originally ended at St. Michael's Counterguard of the Valletta Land Front. It consists of the following:

- La Vittoria Bastion – a small casemated bastion grafted onto the Bastion of Provence which forms part of the land front.
- Polverista Curtain – a long casemated curtain wall between La Vittoria and Msida Bastions. It overlooks the AFM base at Hay Wharf.
- Msida Bastion – a polygonal asymmetrical bastion with a demi-bastioned retrenchment. A cemetery (today Msida Bastion Historic Garden) was built on its upper part in the 19th century.
- an unnamed curtain wall between Msida and Quarantine Bastions
- Quarantine Bastion – a polygonal asymmetrical bastion with a demi-bastioned retrenchment. It is breached by a modern road.

In addition, a bastioned enceinte known as the North Entrenchment is located behind the entire Marsamxett enceinte, acting as a secondary line of defence.

=== Grand Harbour enceinte ===
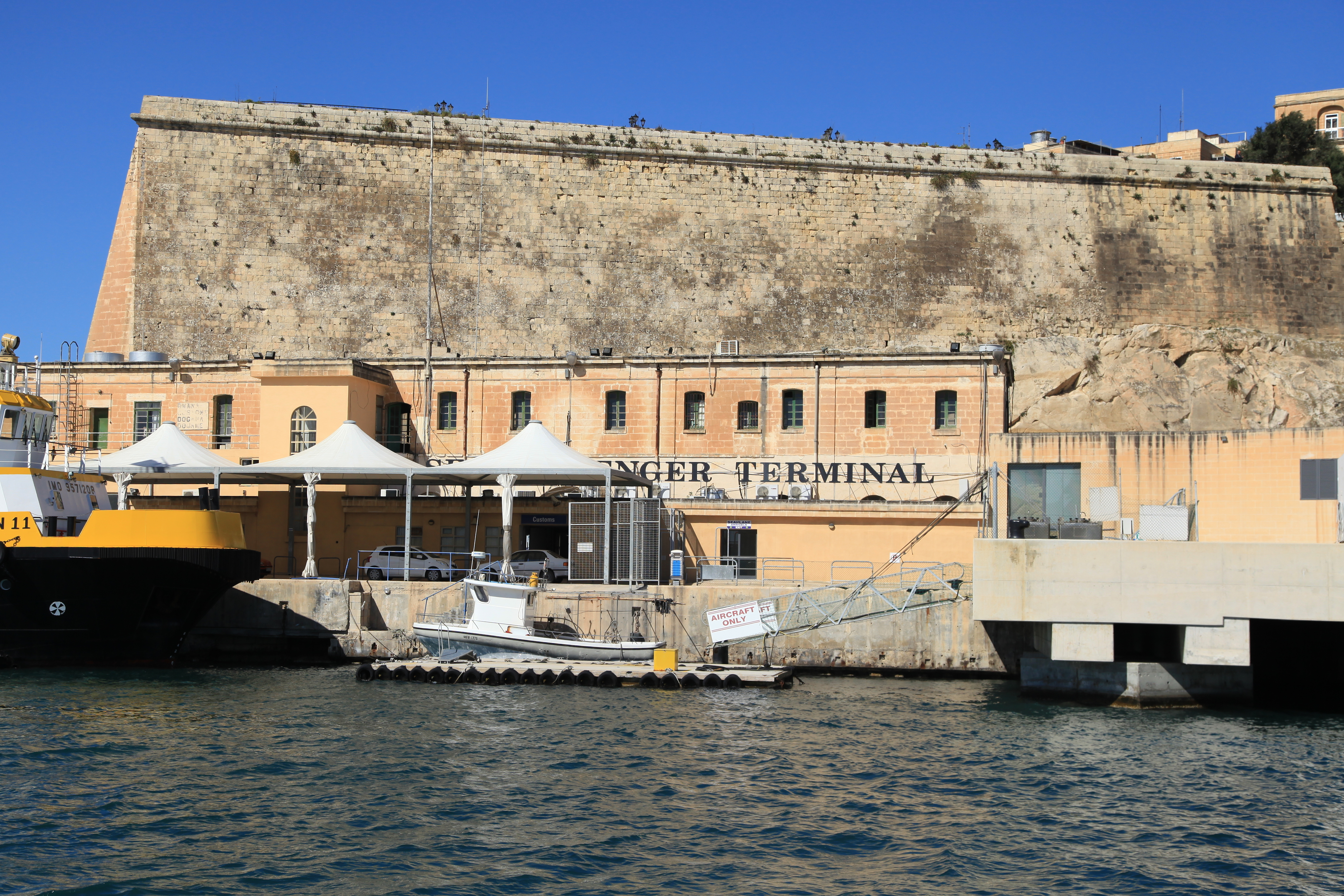
Capuchin Bastion

The enceinte along the side facing the Grand Harbour starts from St. Francis Bastion of the Floriana Land Front, and ends at St. Peter and St. Paul Counterguard of the Valletta Land Front. It consists of the following:

- Capuchin Bastion, also known as Dhoccara, Magazine or Polverista Bastion – a demi-bastion linked to St. Francis Bastion of the land front. It contains an 18th-century gunpowder magazine.
- a curtain wall linking Capuchin Bastion to the platform near Crucifix Curtain
- a flat-faced platform or bastion near Crucifix Curtain
- Crucifix Curtain – curtain wall linking the platform to Crucifix Bastion
- Crucifix Bastion – a large asymmetrical bastion containing a 19th-century gunpowder magazine. It also had a concrete emplacement for a 9-inch BL gun, but this has been removed.
- Kalkara Curtain – curtain wall linking Crucifix and Kalkara Bastions. It is breached by a modern road.
- Kalkara Bastion – a bastioned enceinte linking to St. Peter & St. Paul Counterguard of the Valletta Land Front.
