= Portes des Bombes =

- Bieb il-Bombi
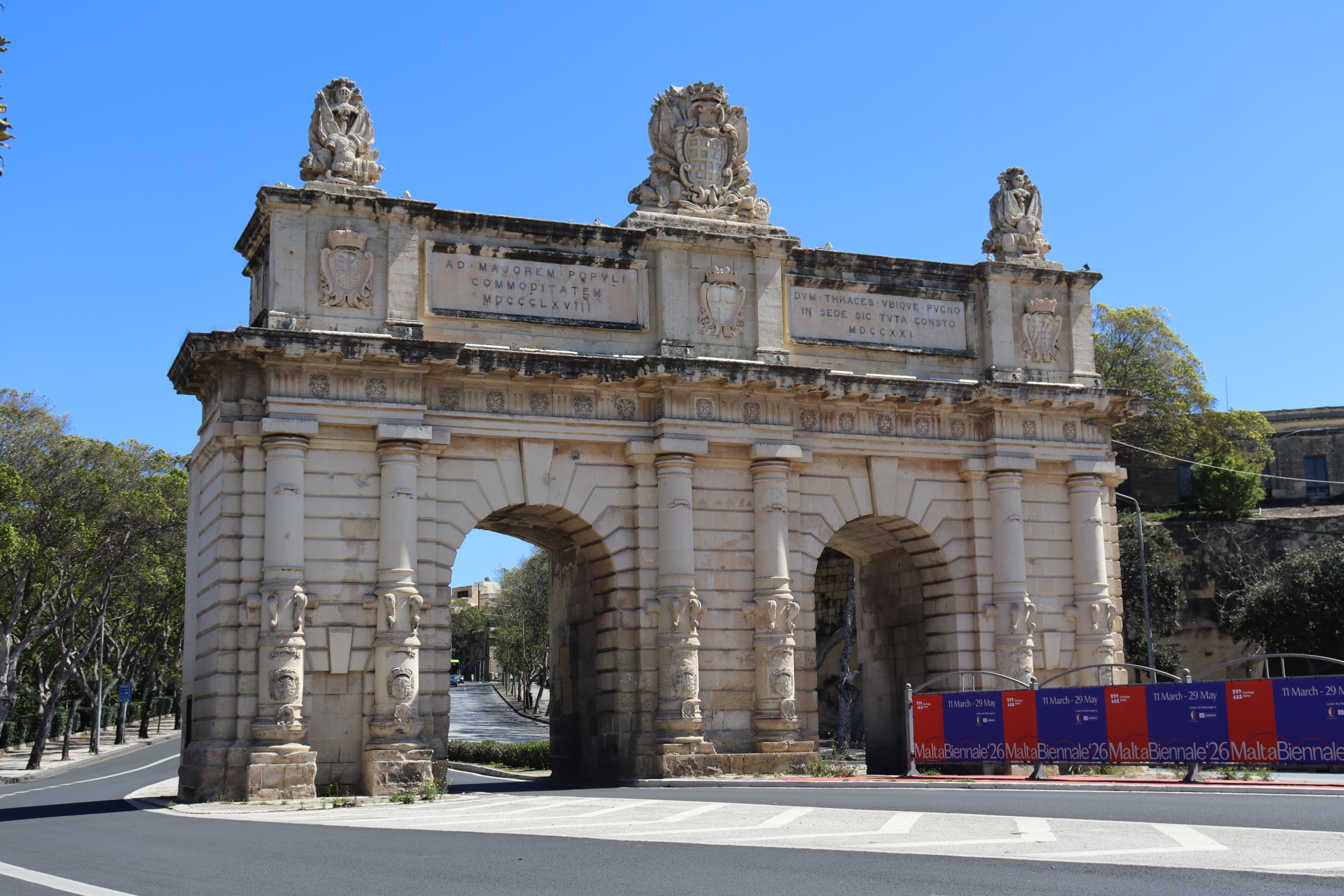
- Bieb il-Bombi in 2026
- Interactive map of the Portes des Bombes area
- Former names: Porta dei Cannoni

General information
- Status: Intact
- Type: Gate
- Architectural style: Baroque
- Location: Floriana, Malta
- Coordinates: 35°53′25.6″N 14°30′7.5″E
- Completed: 1721
- Renovated: 1868
- Cost: 6000 scudi
- Renovation cost: £900
- Owner: Government of Malta

Technical details
- Material: Limestone

Design and construction
- Architect: Charles François de Mondion

Renovating team
- Architect: Col. E. W. Dunford

Portes des Bombes (Maltese: Bieb il-Bombi, Italian: Porta delle Bombe, meaning "Bombs' Gate"), originally called Porta dei Cannoni (meaning "Cannons Gate"), is an ornamental arched gate in Floriana, Malta. It was built in 1721 as an advanced gate within the faussebraye of the Floriana Lines, and it was enlarged with the construction of a second archway in 1868. The ramparts on either side of the gate have since been demolished, leaving the gate looking like a triumphal arch.

== History ==
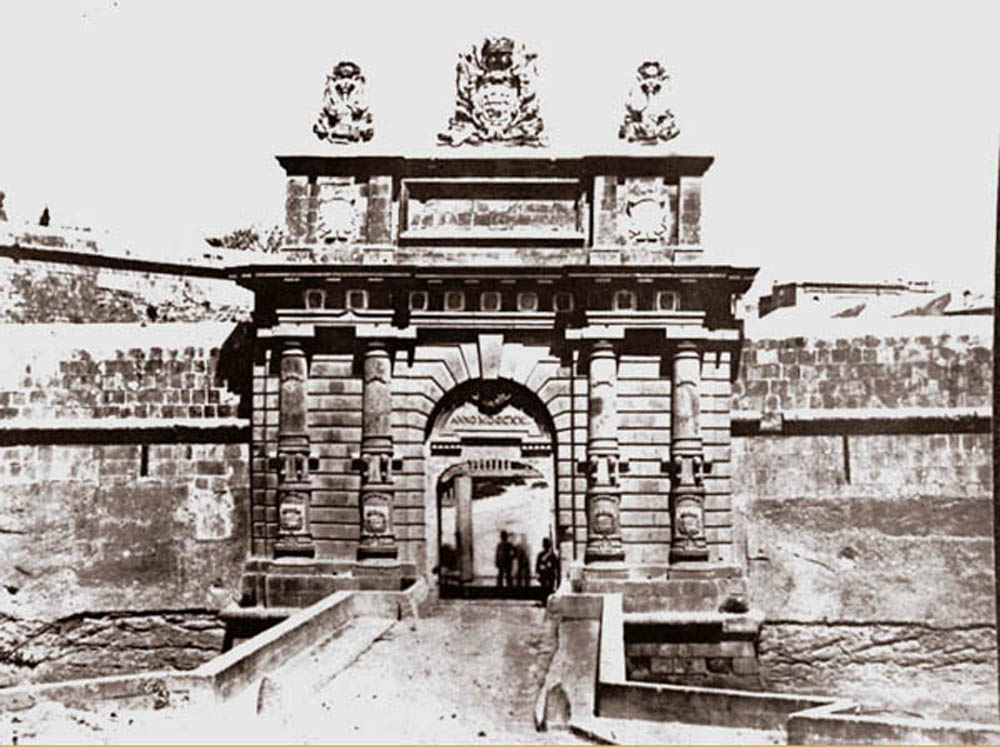
The original configuration of Porte des Bombes as seen in an 1860s photo

Construction of the Floriana Lines began in 1636, but works proceeded slowly and the lines were only completed in the early 18th century. The lines had a large bastioned land front with outworks and a faussebraye. Porte des Bombes was built in 1720–21 within the faussebraye, being constructed to designs of the French architect Charles François de Mondion at a cost of 6,000 scudi. The gate originally had a single arch, and it served as Floriana's outer entrance, leading to the town's main gate Porta Sant'Anna. It was originally protected by a lunette.

Porte des Bombes was captured by French soldiers during the French invasion of Malta in June 1798. At this point the Maltese insurgents opened fire in its direction, to challenge the occupants, which had left significant bullet marks on the front.

In the mid-19th century the British government enlarged the gate by adding a second archway to accommodate the increasingly heavy traffic in the Grand Harbour area. This enlargement was designed by the architect Col. E. W. Dunford of the Royal Engineers, and it cost a total of £900. The second gate was inaugurated on 17 August 1868, during the governorship of Sir Patrick Grant.

In the early 20th century, some of the ornamentation in the archways was removed so as to enable trams to pass through the gate. The lunette outside the gate was subsequently demolished to make way for a new road, while the ramparts on either side of the gate were demolished in the 1930s to cope with the increasing volume of traffic. These alterations resulted in the gate losing its legibility as part of the Floriana Lines, making it look like a triumphal arch.

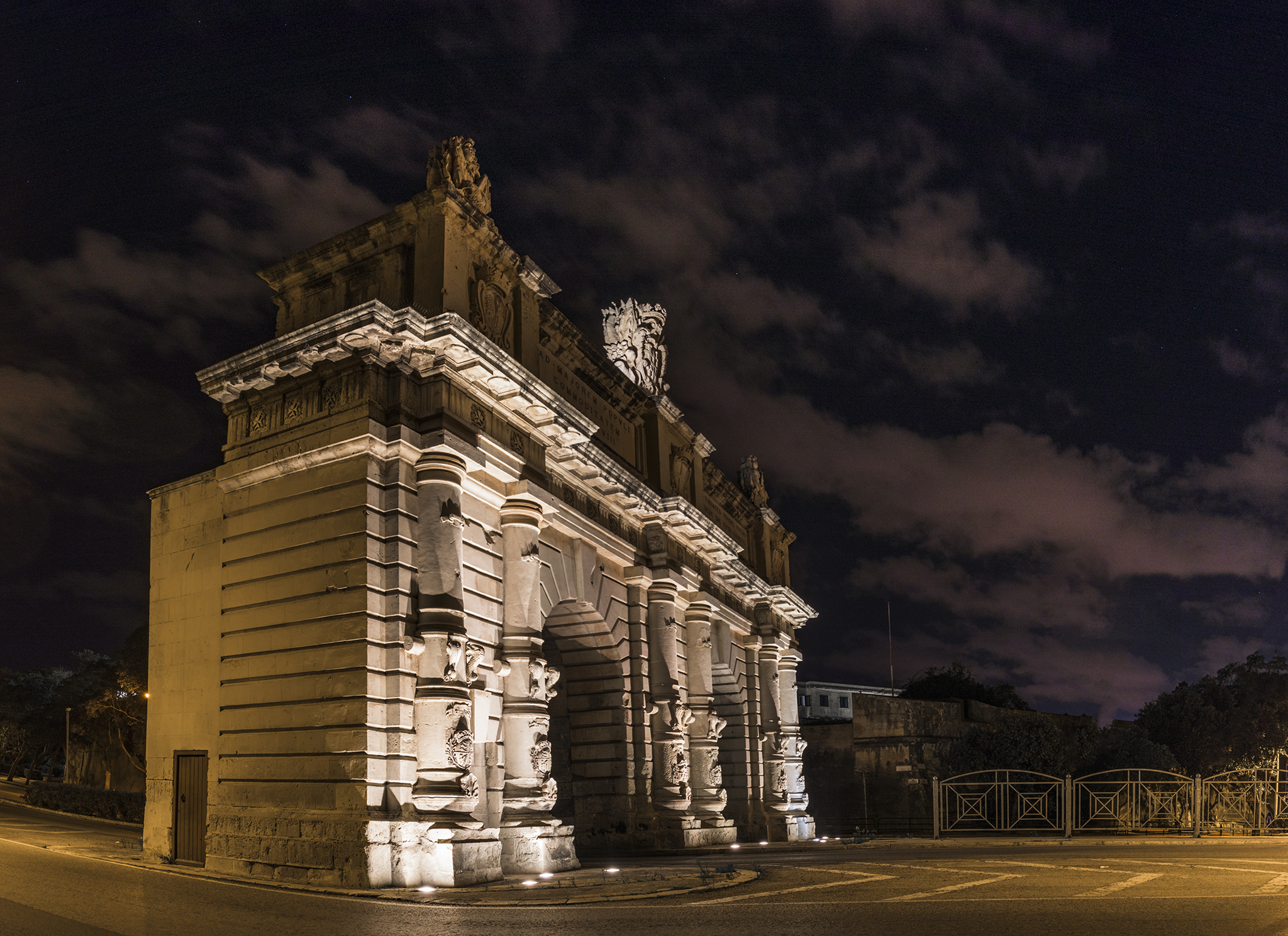
The gate at night

The gate was restored between September 2002 and March 2003, at a cost of Lm 55,000. The restoration works also included the installation of a lighting system. The gate was vandalized in May 2005 when burnt oil was daubed on it, but the damage was cleaned within a couple of days. The gate is considered, by the police force, as a high street hazard for passing vehicles. On 24 October 2012, there was some damage when an Arriva bus skidded into it and two other buses later crashed into the first bus and 22 passengers were injured. However the damaged part of the gate was repaired a few days later.

The gate and the rest of the Floriana Lines were included on the Antiquities List of 1925. It is now scheduled as a Grade 1 national monument, and it is also listed on the National Inventory of the Cultural Property of the Maltese Islands.

The gate is occasionally open to the public, such as in October as part of the festivities of Notte Bianca.

== Architecture ==
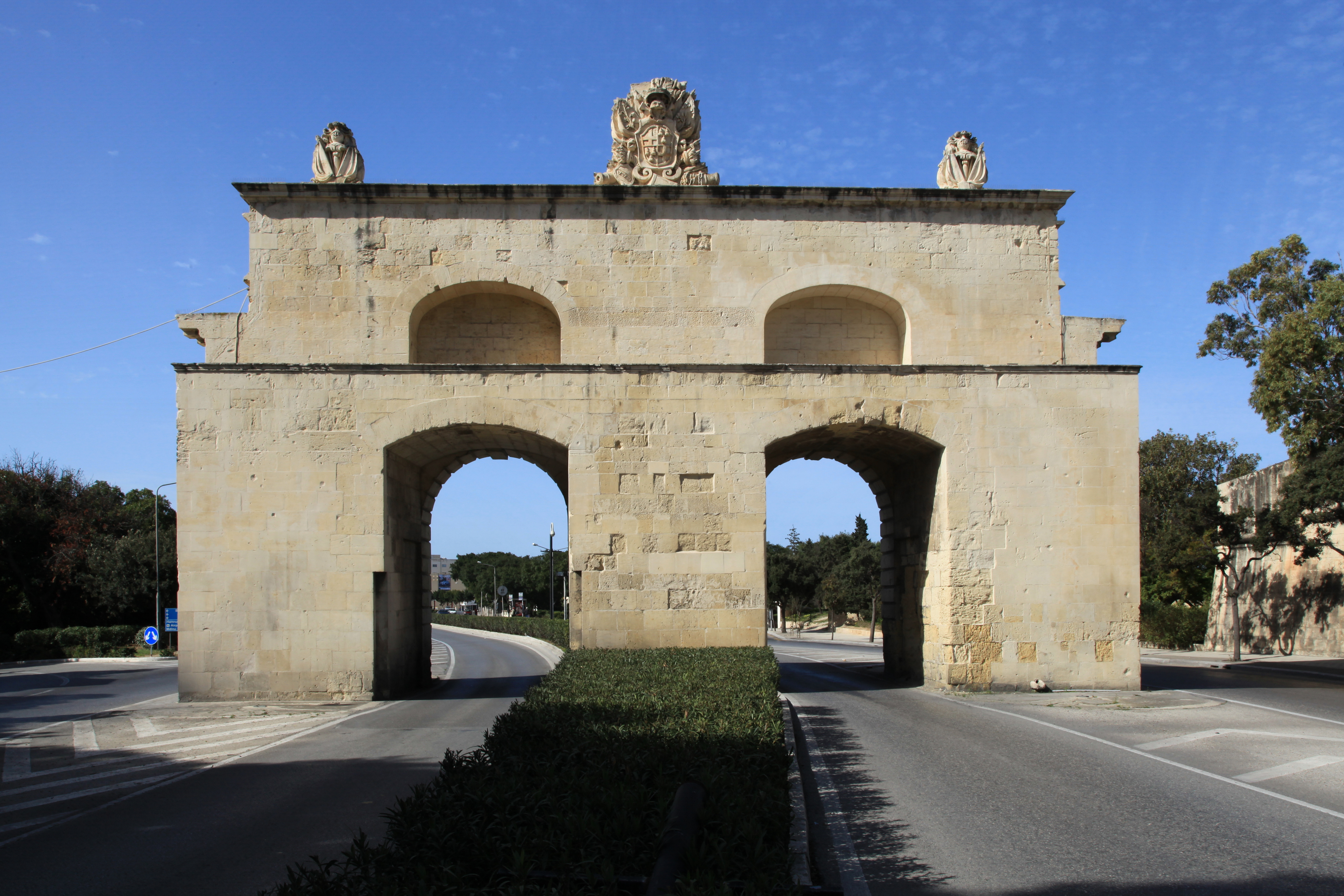
The gate as viewed from the rear

Porte des Bombes was built in the Baroque style. The gate originally had a single arch, but the second arch on the left is a 19th-century addition. Each arched entrance is flanked by carved cannons, which gave the gate its original name Porta dei Cannoni, and each cannon has a relief of a coat of arms. The four cannons which formed part of the original gate bear the arms of Grand Master Ramon Perellos y Roccaful, while the two cannons on the second arch bear the royal coat of arms of the United Kingdom. The gate has a cornice above a row of carved Maltese crosses. Above the cornice are escutcheons bearing the coats of arms of the Order of St. John, Grand Master Perellos, and the United Kingdom, as well as two marble plaques with Latin inscriptions. The plaque on the right side of the gate reads:

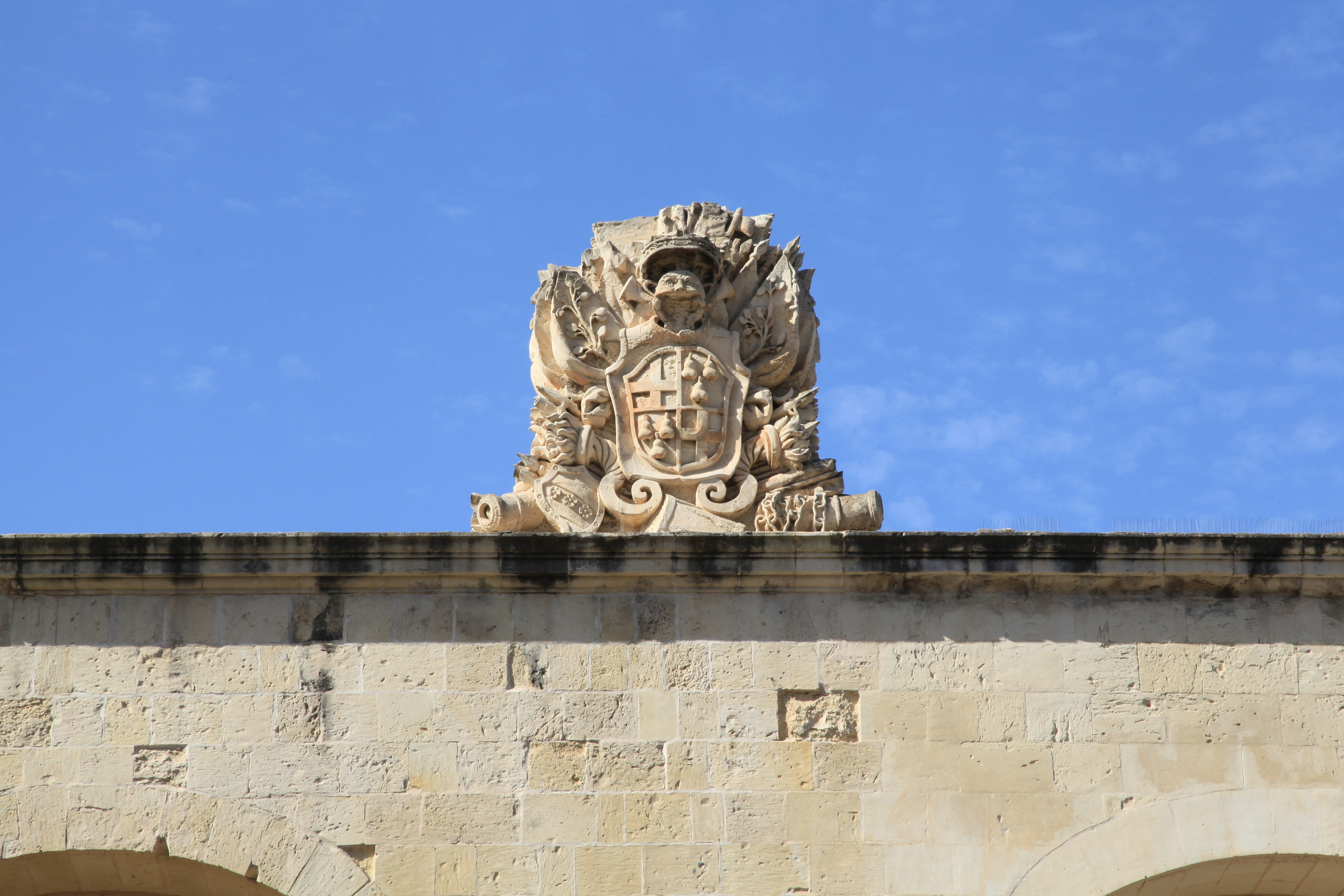
Coat of arms of Ramon Perellos y Roccaful on the gate

DVM THRACES VBIQUE PVGNO
IN SEDE SIC TVTA CONSTO
MDCCXXI

(meaning While I fight the Turks everywhere, I am secure in my seat – 1721)

The plaque on the left side reads:

AD MAJOREM POPVLI
COMMODITATEM
MDCCCLXVIII

(meaning For the greater convenience of the public – 1868)

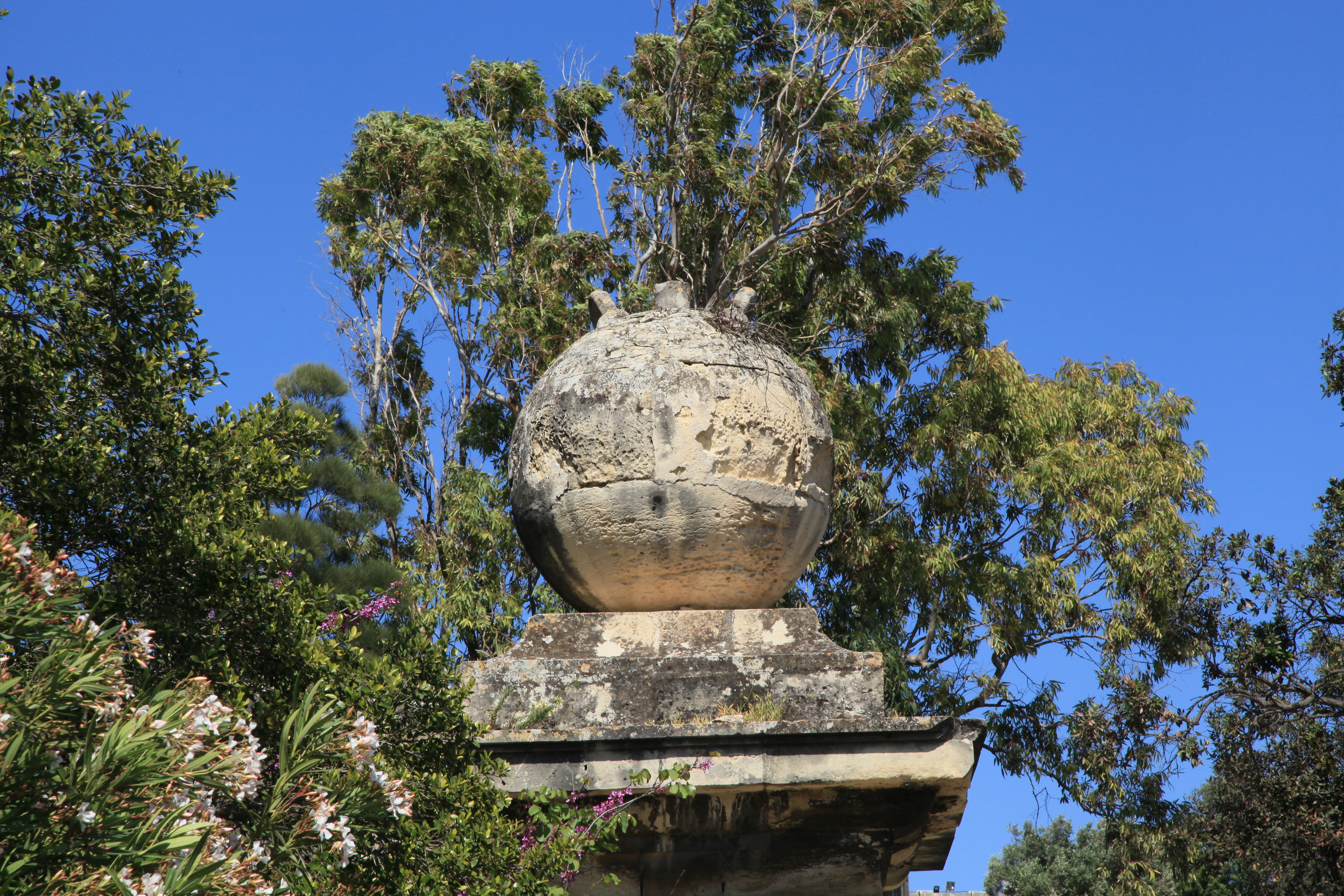
One of the "bomblu" from which the gate gets its name

Three trophies, the central one bearing Perellos' arms, are found at the top of the gate. These all formed part of the original gate, but they were relocated when it was enlarged.

Just outside the gate there are two pillars bearing stone balls fashioned as large water carriers with handles and a spout. These are known as Bomblu in Maltese and gave the gate its present name Porte des Bombes.

Porte des Bombes is one of only two gates in Malta which bear representations of life-sized artillery pieces, the other one being St. Helen's Gate which was built in 1736.

== In popular culture ==
- The gate is visible in the 2016 film 13 Hours: The Secret Soldiers of Benghazi.
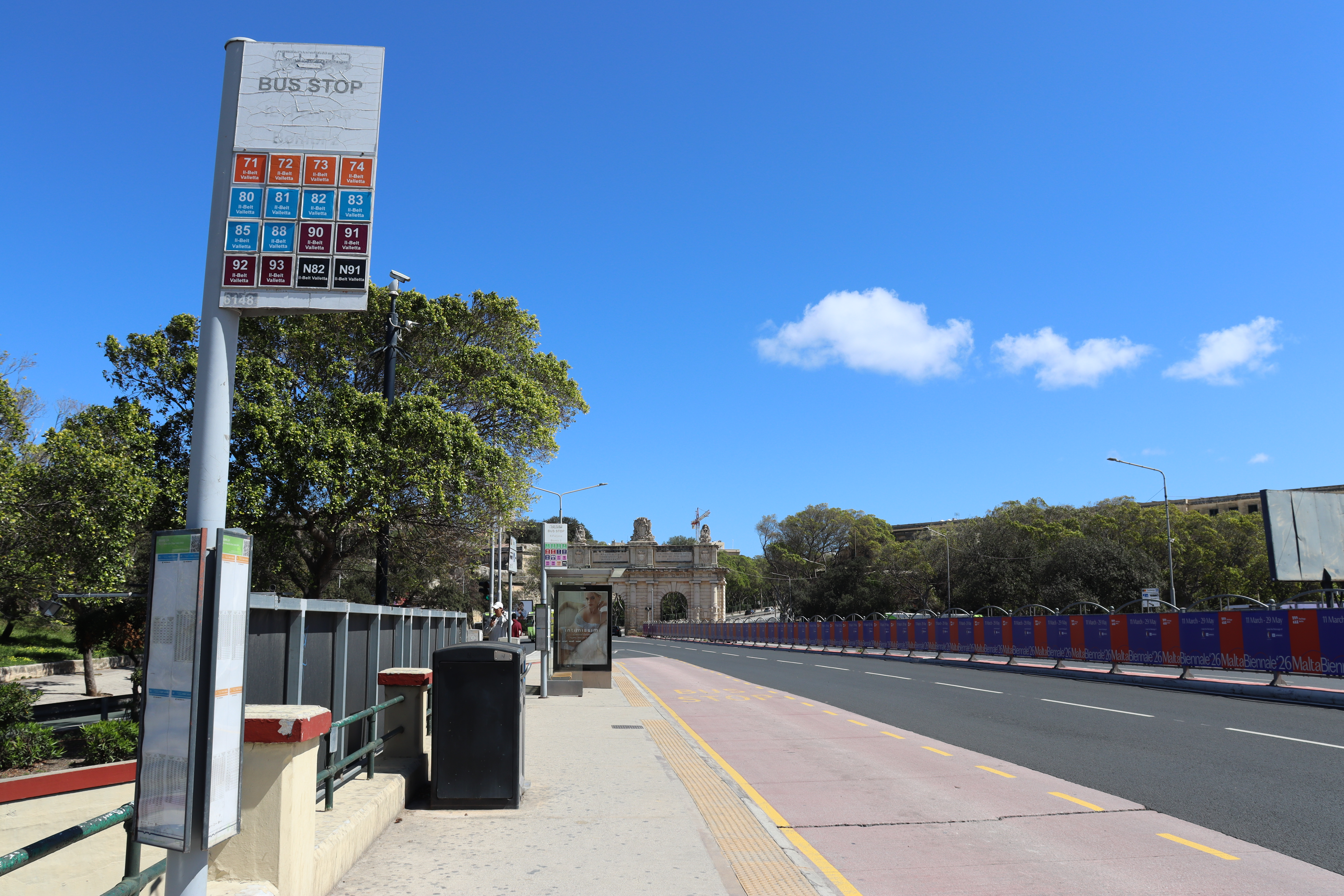
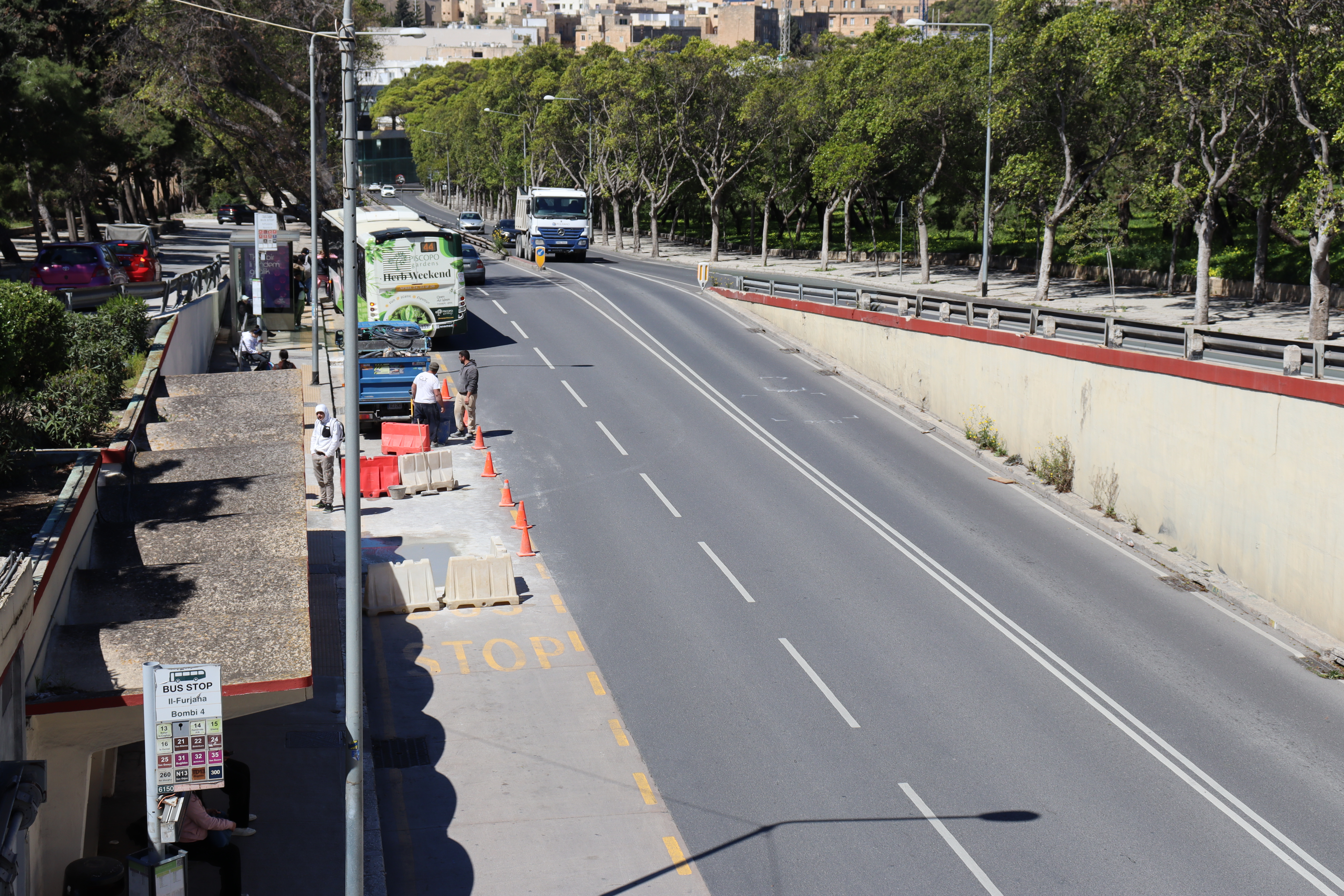
Two of the Bombi bus stops, among the most used and visited stops in Malta, pictured in 2026
