= Pietro Paolo Floriani =

Italian engineer and architect

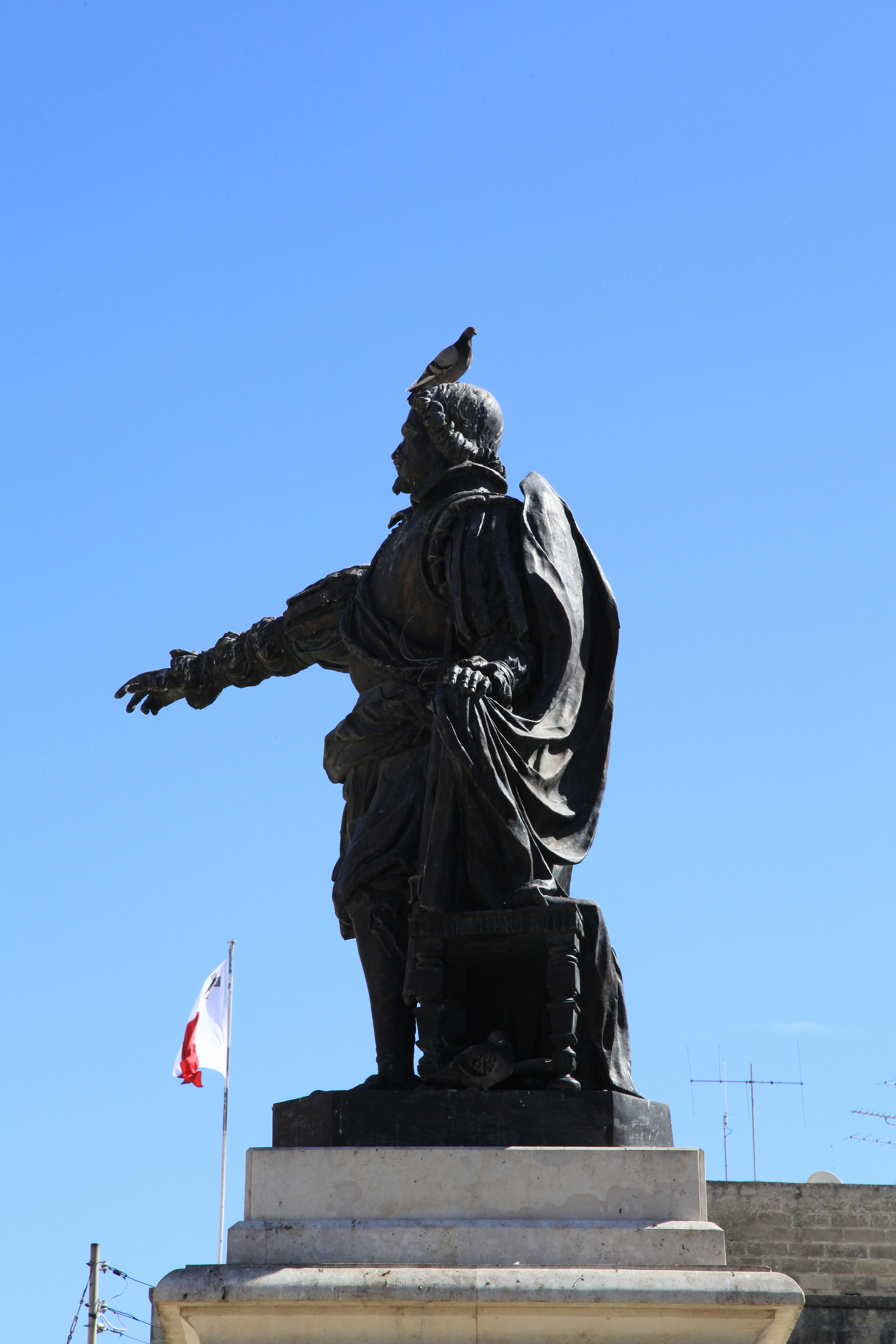
- Monument to Pietro Paolo Floriani erected in 2009 at Floriana, Malta
- Born: 26 April 1585; Macerata
- Died: 27 May 1638 (aged 53); Ferrara

Pietro Paolo Floriani (26 April 1585 – 27 May 1638) was an Italian engineer and architect who designed military and theatrical buildings.

== Life and work ==
Floriani was born on 26 April 1585 in the town of Macerata to Pompeo Floriani and Claudia Rotelli. In 1606 he married Maria Fedeli, but she died in 1608 while giving birth to their daughter Camilla. In 1608 he went to Crema where he was employed by the governor of the city Orazio del Monte. In 1611 he went to Pesaro, and by July 1612 he was already highly regarded among the gentlemen of Macerata.

In autumn 1612 Floriani settled in Madrid, Spain, where King Philip III commissioned him for a number of projects including to explore the fortifications of Algiers to plan a conquest of the city. In 1617 Floriani was sent to work for the Governor of Milan Pedro Álvarez de Toledo, who had begun an extensive defensive engineering program. Floriani spent about a year in Milan, and although the King of Spain invited him to return to the Algiers project, he declined as he had been commissioned by Archduke Leopold V to fortify the town of Brisach in Hungary. He then took part in strengthening the defences of Pressburg and Vienna. He was present at the Battle of White Mountain in 1620. Within the next couple of years he designed both military and non-military buildings in other cities including Altenburg, until he resigned as a military engineer in 1624.

He then had a successful military career and was eventually appointed as a warden in Castel Sant'Angelo in December 1627. He then married Lucrezia Gardina, the widow of Lorenzo Costa. In early 1629 he was appointed by Carlo Barberini and so he went to Ferrara, and he also worked for Pope Urban VIII.

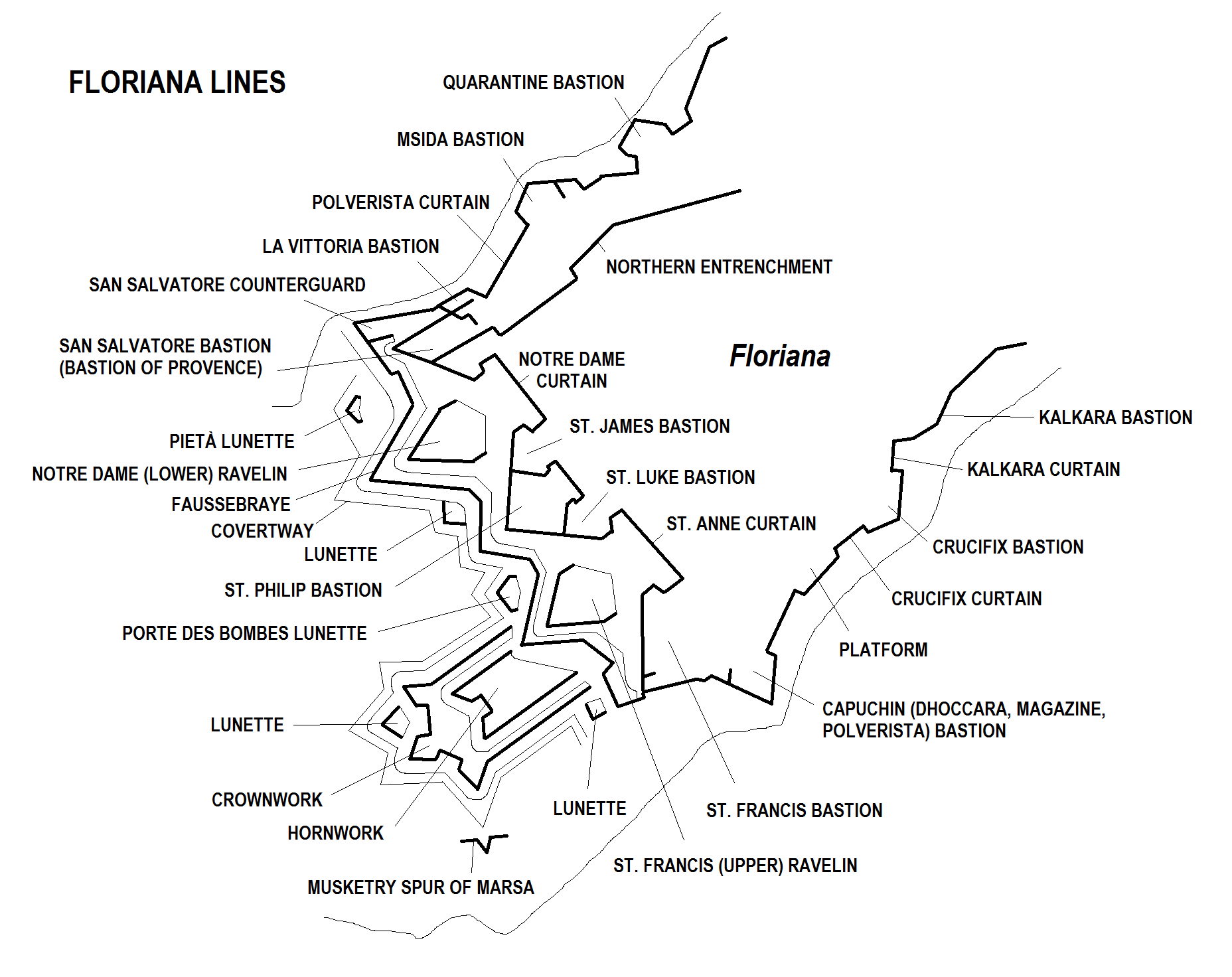
Floriani designed the Floriana Lines

In 1635, the Grandmaster of the Order of Saint John Fra Antoine de Paule invited Floriani to discuss how to strengthen the landward fortifications of Valletta, the capital city of Malta, over which the Order was sovereign. A line of fortifications was designed by Floriani, and these became known as the Floriana Lines. The area between Valletta and the new fortifications eventually became a town in its own right, and was named Floriana after the engineer.

In 1637 he went to Rome and to his hometown Macerata, before being called back to Ferrara. He died there on 27 May 1638. Floriani had written his will in 1632 in which he asked to be buried with his brother Felice who had died in 1630 at the church of Santa Croce in Macerata. The church was later destroyed by the French in 1799.

== Legacy ==
Floriani is a key figure in his native town of Macerata and throughout the region of the Marche due to his multifaceted personality which is revealed in two of his annotated manuscripts from the Compagnoni Floriani di Macerata with sketches of theatrical scenes.

He is also widely remembered as an architect for designing the Floriana Lines and being the namesake of Floriana. In 2006, a documentary was made about his life, although it included some fictional elements as well.

The town of Floriana was twinned with Macerata in 2007. The Floriana Local Council also built a statue of the architect in Pjazza Robert Samut. The monument was designed by a young Maltese architect Chris Ebejer and was unveiled on 17 April 2009 by the Mayor of Floriana Nigel Holland, in the presence of the Mayor of Macerata, Giorgio Meschini and Countess Carla Compagnoni Floriani, a descendant of the engineer, and other guests.
