= Covertway =

Feature in military architecture

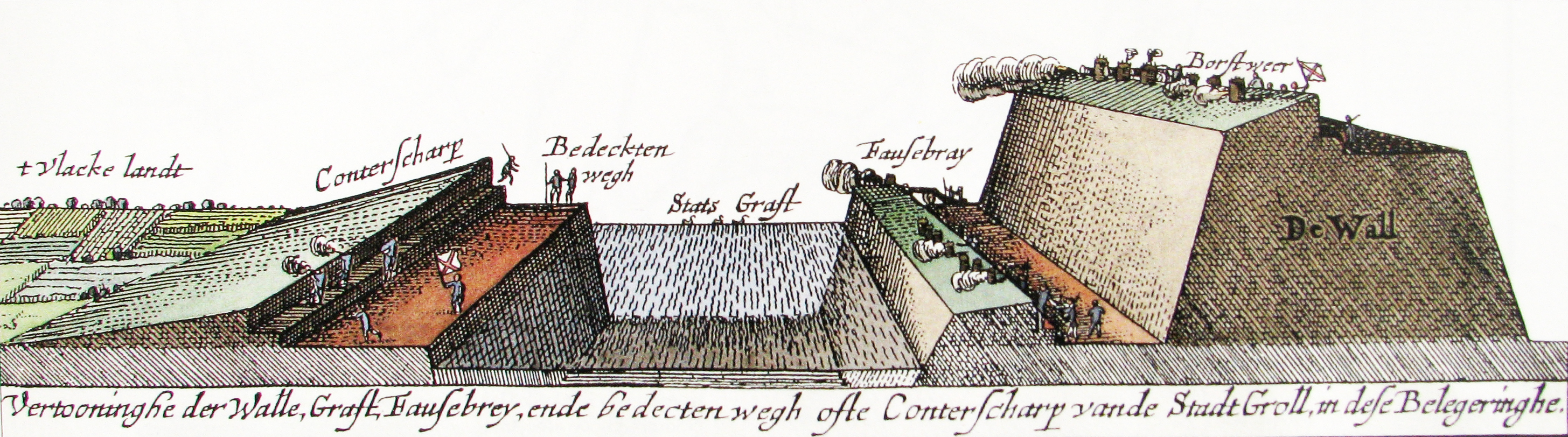
17th century illustration showing a cross-section of the fortifications of Groenlo. From left to right: counterscarp, covertway, ditch, faussebraye and the main defensive wall.

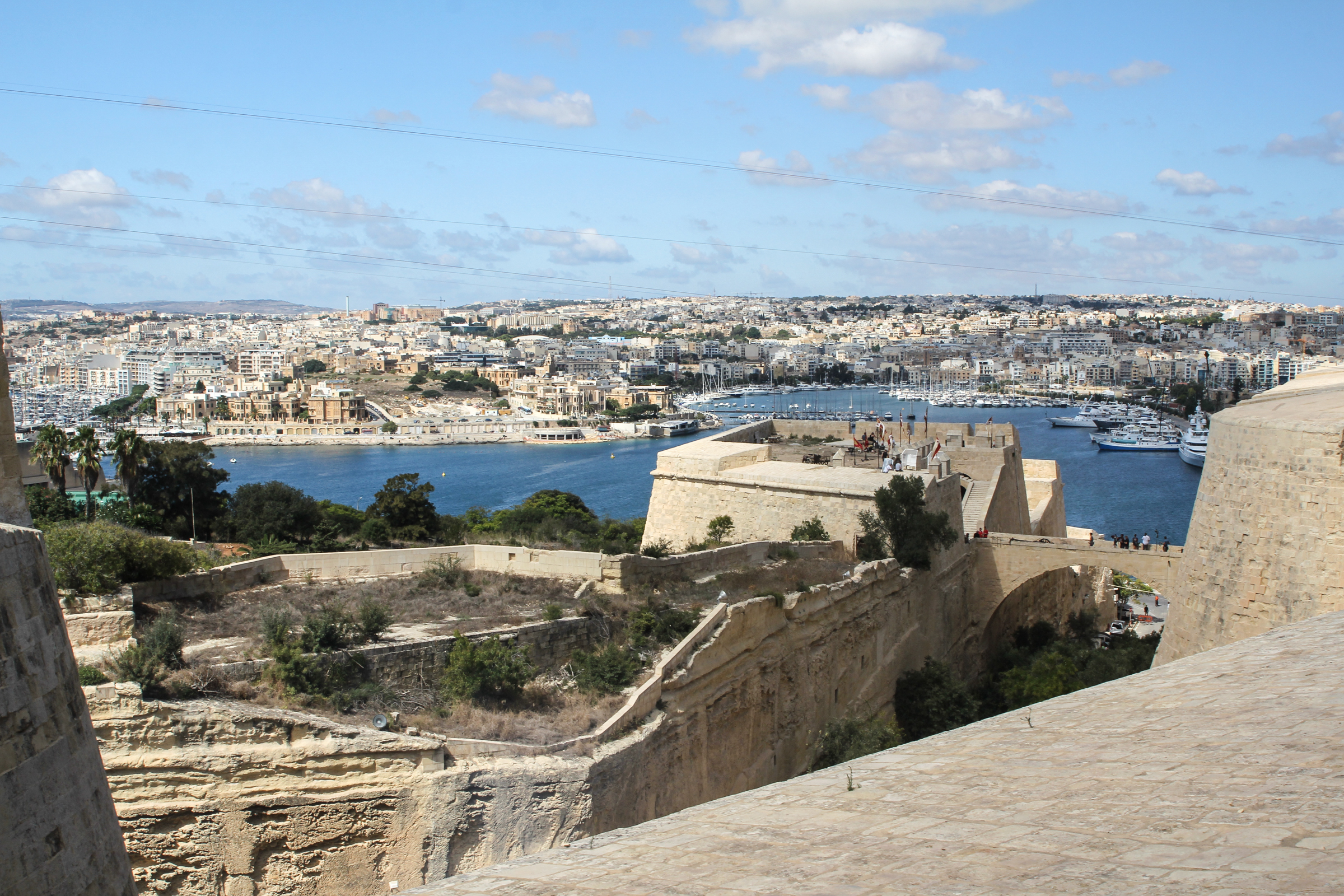
A place-of-arms on the covertway of Valletta

In military architecture, a covertway or covered way (French: chemin couvert, Italian: strada coperta) is a path on top of the counterscarp of a fortification. It is protected by an embankment which is made up by the crest of the glacis. It is able to give the fort's garrison a position beyond the ditch, as well as a continuous line of communication around the outworks.

An enlarged area within a covertway designed to allow troops to assemble on it is known as a place-of-arms.
