= Place-of-arms =

Place in a fortification where troops can gather

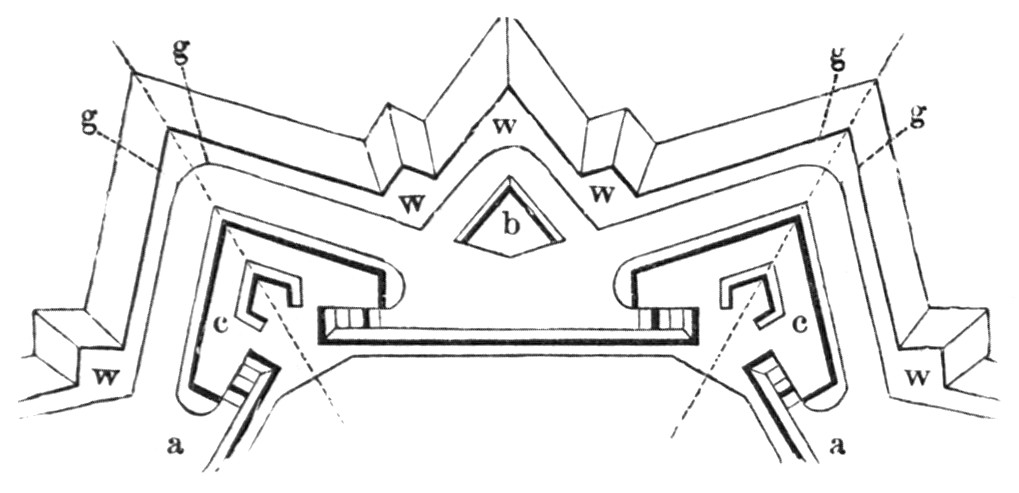
Plan of a bastioned fortification, with re-entrant places-of-arms marked W

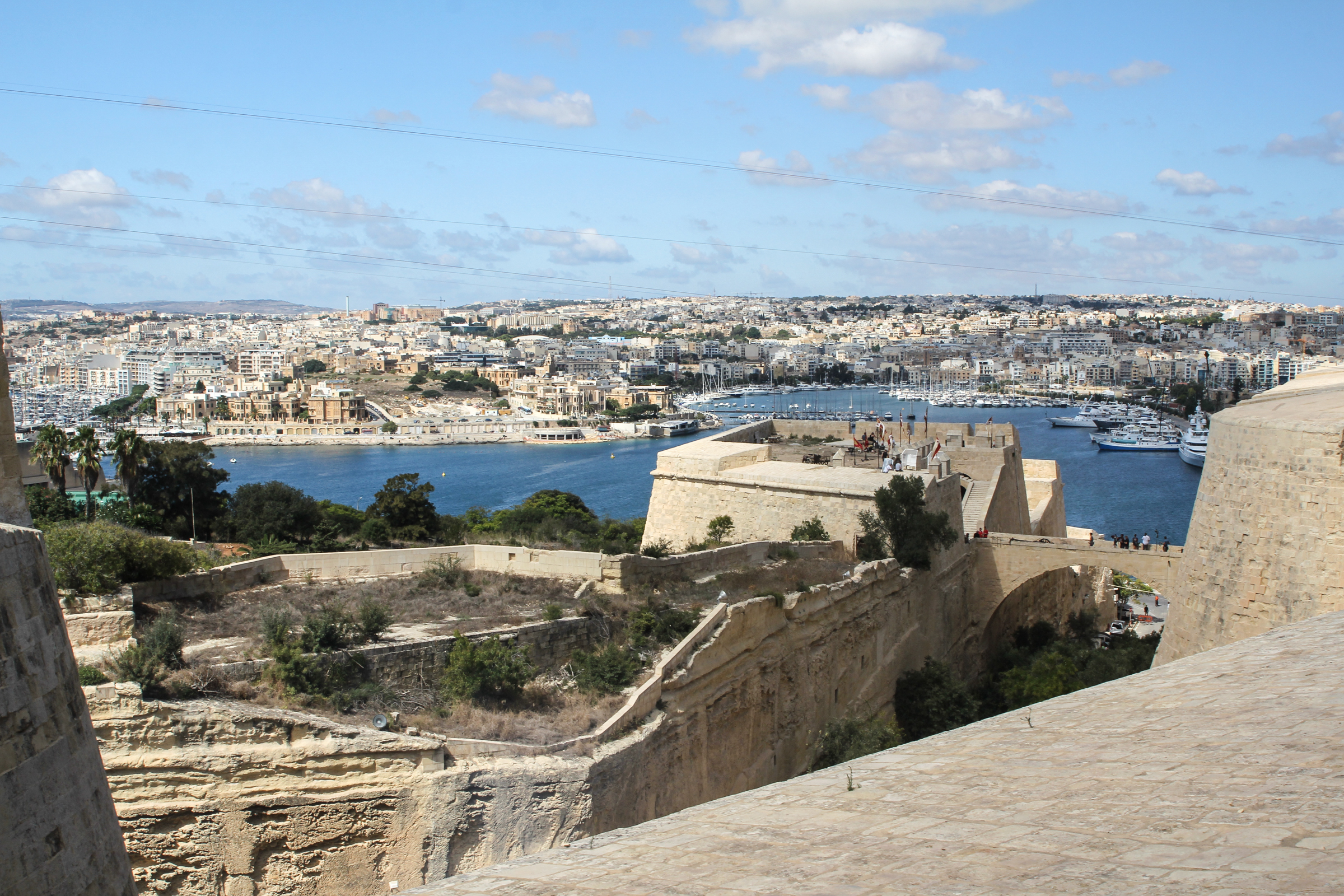
A place-of-arms on the covertway of Valletta

A place-of-arms (Italian: piazza d'armi, French: place d'armes, Portuguese: praça de armas, Spanish: plaza de armas) is any place in a fortification where troops can gather. The term has a number of meanings, but it generally refers to an enlarged area of the covertway designed as an assembly point for soldiers, or a square in the centre of a fortress, also known as a parade ground.

There are two types of places-of-arms:

- Salient place-of-arms: a place-of-arms which protrudes outside the polygonal shape of the fortification
- Re-entrant place-of-arms: a place-of-arms which does not protrude outside the polygonal shape of the fortification
