= Faussebraye =

Type of defensive wall

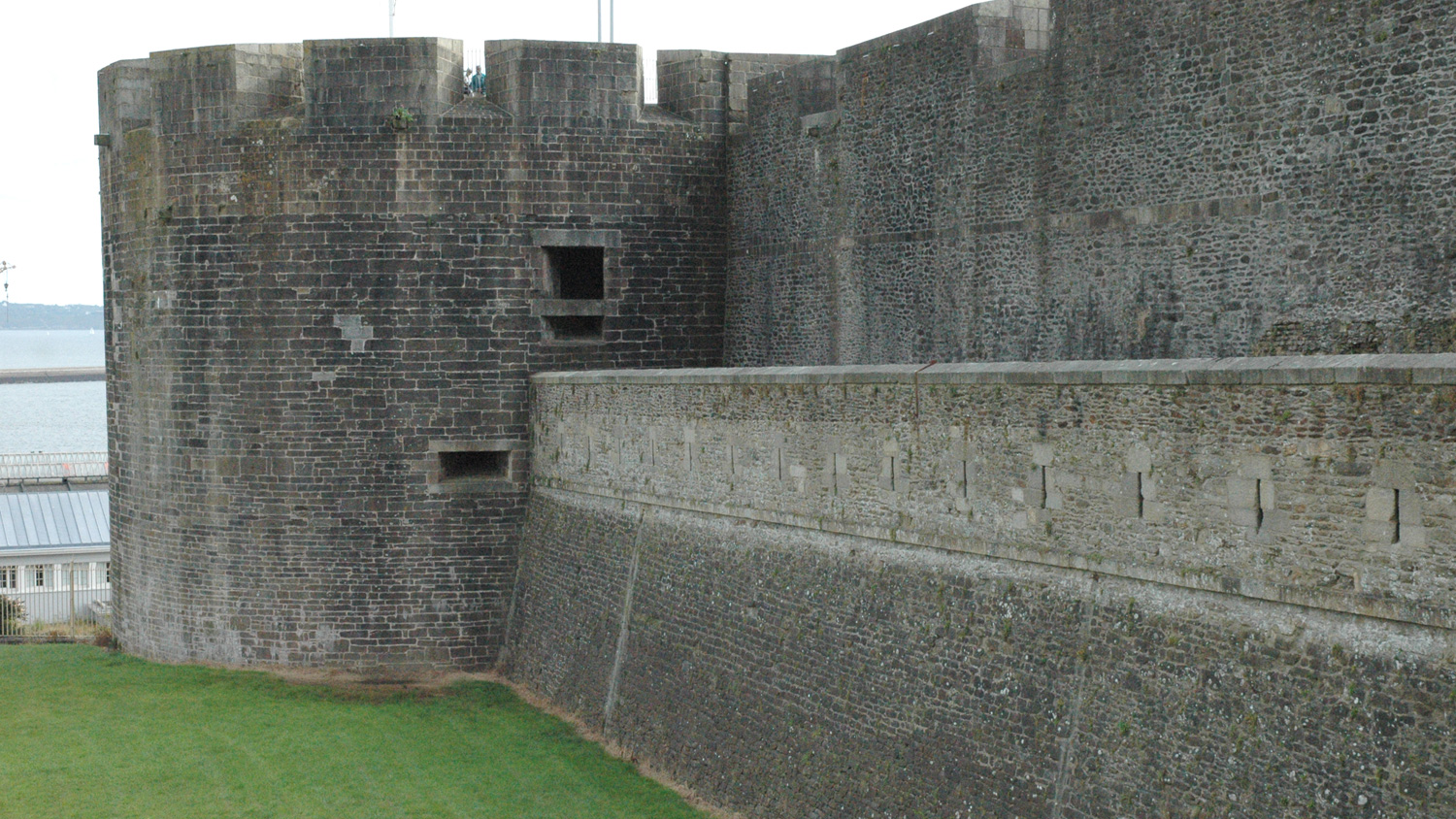
Faussebraye of Château de Brest

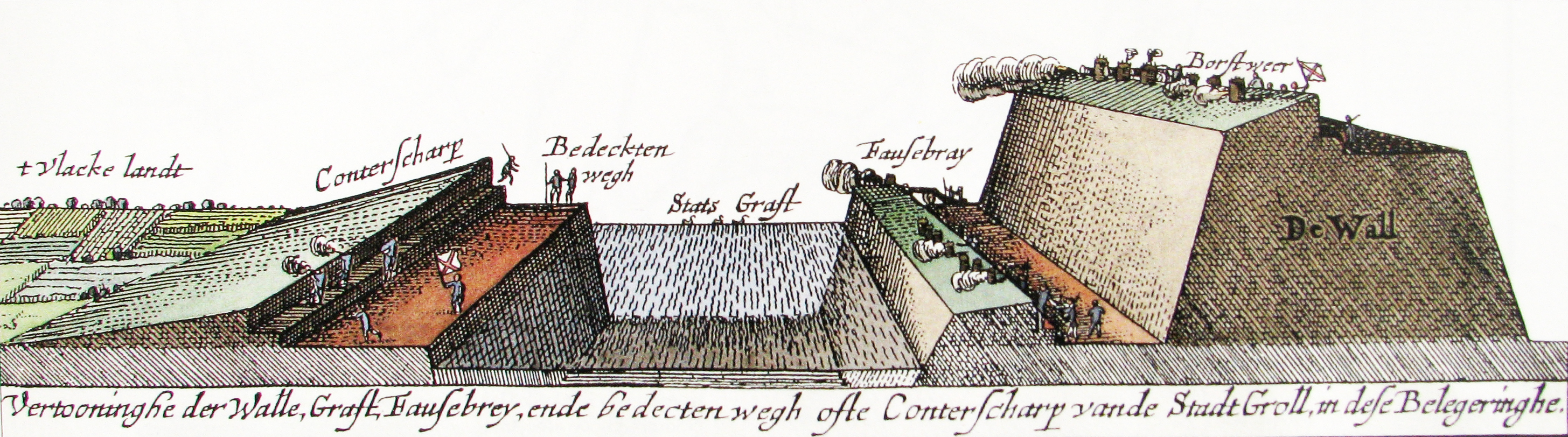
17th century illustration showing a cross-section of the fortifications of Groenlo. From left to right: counterscarp, covertway, ditch, faussebraye and the main defensive wall.

A faussebraye (Italian: falsa braga) is a defensive wall located outside the main walls of a fortification. It is of a lower height than the main walls, and is preceded by a ditch. In Greek and Byzantine fortifications, the faussebraye was known as a proteichisma.
