= Premju għall-Arti =

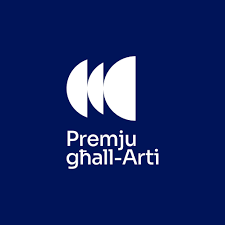
- Premju għall-Arti Logo
- Awarded for: Malta's Cultural and Creative Industries
- Country: Malta
- Established: 2017
- Website: https://www.premju.mt

Television/radio coverage
- Produced by: Arts Council Malta
- Directed by: Ray Calleja

The Premju għall-Arti (also known as the Malta Arts Awards) is an awards programme organised by Arts Council Malta that recognises significant achievements within Maltese culture and the creative industries. The ceremony is held biennially and honours artistic work produced during the preceding two years.

The awards were launched in 2017, with the first edition being held in 2018. They acknowledge individuals who have made notable contributions to Maltese cultural life over the course of their careers, as well as outstanding artistic projects. The honours presented include both competitive awards and non-competitive recognitions.

The Premju għall-Arti was initially held annually and broadcast on Maltese national television. Over time, the format changed, and it is now live-streamed on social media platforms and held every two years.

A combination of competitive awards and non-competitive honours are presented at the ceremony. Nominations for the competitive categories are submitted by members of the public. An evaluation board appointed by Arts Council Malta decides on the shortlisted entries and selects the award recipients. Certain categories are decided through a public vote following the board’s shortlisting process, although the specific awards subject to public voting have varied between editions.

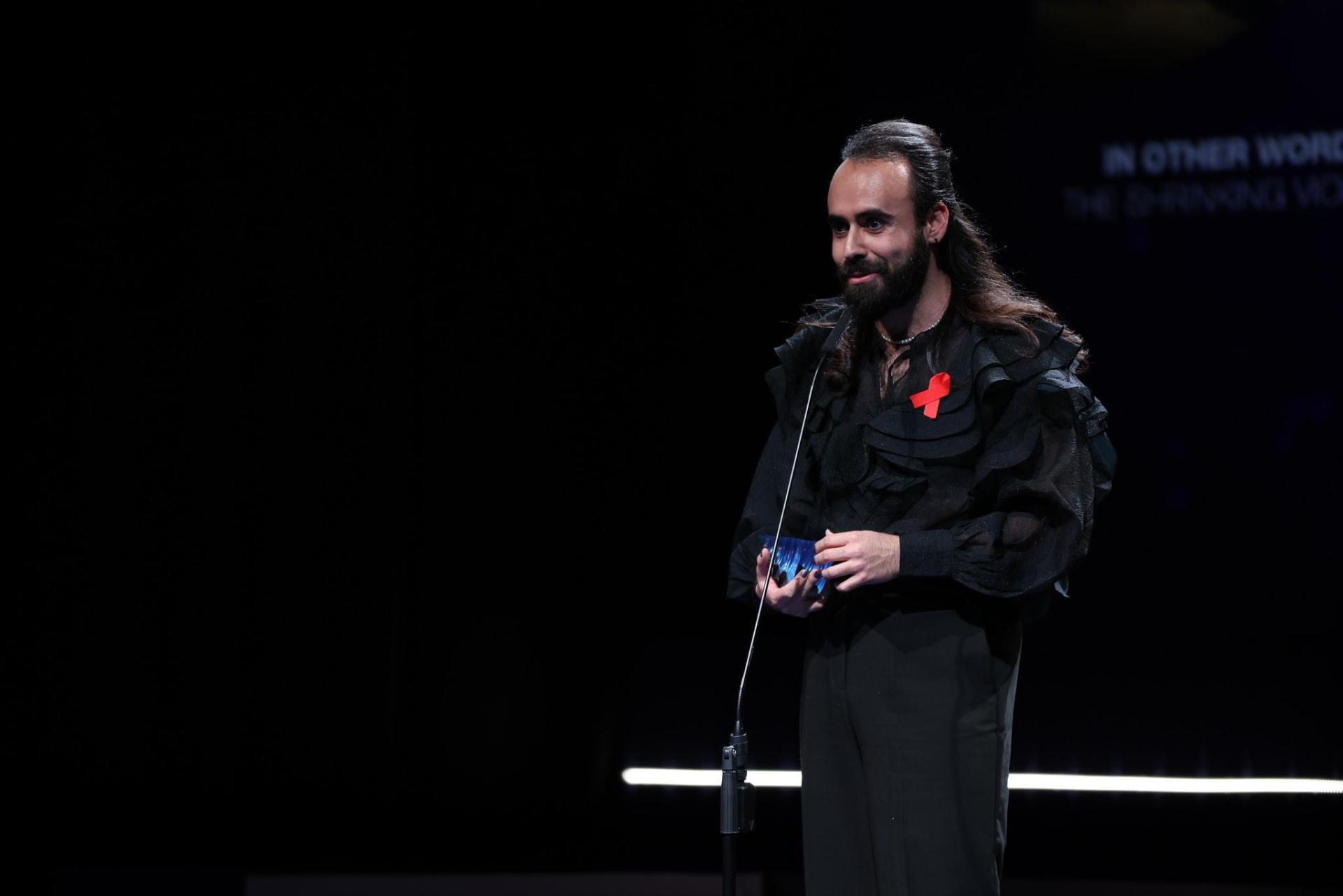
Luke Saydon Winning Premju għall-Arti Award

The awards handed out have varied slightly between editions. In the 2023 ceremony (the sixth edition), the Best Production Award was divided by individual artforms, as comparing projects from different sectors was not considered an effective approach. The revised categories are now designated as Best Production: Theatre, Best Production: Dance, Best Production: Visual Art, Best Production: Multidisciplinary and Best Production: Music.

== Results ==
2018 - First Edition
Award	Nominess				Winners
Best Project in The Community	Equality in Music: Radio Valo Team, Down Syndrome Association	Setting Up Our Social Enterprise: Nicholas Agius	Darba Waħda: Anna Formosa	B'Tal-linja Jaqbillek Żgur: Sean Buhagiar	Aħdar id-Deżert: Opening Doors
Best International Achievement	From Home with Love: ŻfinMalta Dance Ensemble	Vengeance: Gordon Calleja	Malta. Land of Sea: BOZAR Centre of Fine Arts and Heritage Malta	Symphony No. 3 'Eroica' by Ludwig van Beethoven: The Malta Philharmonic Orchestra	Charlene Farrugia's international performance: Charlene Farrugia
Best Work for Young Audiences	Pietru u l-Lupu: The Malta Philharmonic Orchestra	Ineż Kienet Perf(etta): Studio 18	Shakespeare in pieces: Teatru Manoel	Shakeshorts presents A Midsummer's Night Dream: Chris Dingli	Fanfare Family Concert: The Malta Philharmonic Orchestra
Best Artistic Programme or Season	The Valletta Film Festival 2017: The Film Grain Foundation	The Malta Jazz Festival 2017: Festivals Malta	The Malta Philharmonic Orchestra Concert Season 2016-2017: The Malta Philharmonic Orchestra	Toi Toi Education Programme – Season 2016-2017: Teatru Manoel	ŻiguŻajg Arts Festival for Children and Young People 2016: Fondazzjoni Kreattività
Best Creative Enterprise	Fablab Valletta	Iniala5			Anvil Game Studios
Young Artist of the Year	Luke Zammit	Stefan Calleja	Isaac Lucas	Laura Buhagiar	Matthew Schembri
Artist of the Year	Luke Zammit	Mikhail Basmadjian	Jonathan Dunn		Moveo Dance Company (Dorian Mallia, Diane Portelli)
Production of the Year	Magic Mouse: Luke Zammit	Diaspora: Contact Dance Company	Venus in Fur: Masquerade Theatre Company	The Prime of Miss Jean Brodie	Symphony No. 9 by Ludwig van Beethoven, Europe Day Concert: The Malta Philharmonic Orchestra
People's Choice Award					The Prime of Miss Jean Brodie: MADC
Ambassador for the Arts Award					Francis Sultana
Lifetime Achievement Award					Prof. Oliver Friggieri

2019 - Second Edition
Award	Nominess				Winners
Best Creative Enterprise	Stargate Studios Malta: Matthew Pullicino				Anvil Games Studios: Andrew Farrugia
Innovation Award	Sabuesos: Stargate Studios Malta	Raymond 'Fight' Beck: Teatru Malta	The Book in the Sea: Glen Calleja	Chant, Silence, Sounds & Spaces: Jubilate Deo Choir	Magna Żmien: Andrew Alamango
Artist of the Year	Sean Buhagiar	Jean-Marc Cafa	Luke Azzopardi		The New Victorians
Best Artistic Programme or Season	ŻiguŻajg Arts Festival for Children and Young People 2017: Fondazzjoni Kreattività	The Valletta 2018 Cultural Programme: The Valletta 2018 Foundation	Toi Toi Education Programme: Teatru Manoel	The Malta Philharmonic Orchestra Programme 2017-2018: The Malta Philharmonic Orchestra	The Malta Jazz Festival 2018: Festivals Malta
Best International Achievement	The Black Hand: Angelcrypt	Holdfast: Nations at War: Anvil Games Studios	A Tale of Two Cities: David Pisani	The European Tour of the Malta Philharmonic Orchestra: The Malta Philharmonic Orchestra	Kirana, Soundscapes: Ruben Żahra
Best Work for Young Audiences	Kanta Kantun: Alex Vella Gregory, Charlo Briguglio and Valletta 2018 Foundation	Tag: Pamela Kerr and Kostas Papamatthaiakis	Dare to Dream: MPO Family Funfare: The Malta Philharmonic Orchestra		Hush: Denise Mulholland and Luke Saydon
Production of the Year	Ernest and the Pale Moon: The Shrinking Violets	The Valletta 2018 Opening: The Valletta 2018 Foundation	A Hero's Life: The Malta Philharmonic Orchestra	The Crucible: Teatru Manoel	Hush: Denise Mulholland and Luke Saydon
Young Artist of the Year	Andre Agius	Nicola Micallef	Stefan Calleja	The Malta Youth Orchestra	Luke Saydon
Best Project in the Community	Ġewwa Barra: Il-Ħasla: Victor Jacono and Valletta 2018 Foundation	Magna Żmien: Andrew Alamango	The Annual Representation of Opening Doors 2018: Opening Doors Association	Joan: Drachma	Deep Shelter: Pamela Baldacchino and Valletta 2018 Foundation
Audience's Choice Award	Ilħna Mitlufa: Teatru Malta	Is-Serra: Teatru Malta	Il-Festa il-Kbira: The Valletta 2018 Foundation	Skylight: MADC	Valletta 2018 Opening: Valletta 2018 Foundation
Lifetime Achievement Award					Richard England
Honour for Artistic Legacy					Soċjeta' Santa Marija u Banda Re Gorg V Mqabba
Honour for Cultural Promoters					European Foundation for Support of Culture: Konstantin Ishkhanov

Due to restrictions arising from the COVID-19 pandemic, the Third Edition of the Premju għall-Arti was live-streamed for the first time on Arts Council Malta's Facebook page. The event was held without an audience, and winners delivered their speeches remotely from home. It was hosted by Ray Calleja, Artistic Director of the Premju għall-Arti.

2020 - Third Edition
Award	Nominess				Winners
Best Work for Young Audiences	2.0 Watts in the dark: Andre Agius	Nimxu Mixja: Kristina Borg, Raffaella Zammit, Gabriel Caruana Foundation AND Kulleġġ Santa Tereża Skola Primarja Birkirkara	Ninu: Bettina Paris AND Anton Saliba	Lord of the Flies: Toi Toi, Teatru Manoel Education Programme	Trikki Trakki – Youth Theatre Festival: Teatru Malta
Best Project in The Community	The Cospicua short play festival: Kunsill Lokali Bormla and Teatru Malta	Dizabilita' Astrofiżika: Grupp Bravi Ax Gravi and CRPD (The Commission for rights of people with disability)	Nassaba – Song of a Bird: Teatru Malta	GawGaw A Panto in the Dark: Teatru Malta	Nimxu Mixja: Kristina Borg, Raffaella Zammit, Gabriel Caruana Foundation and Kulleġġ Santa Tereża Skola Primarja Birkirkara
Best Artistic Programme or Season	Malta Jazz Festival 2019: Festivals Malta	ŻiguŻajg 2018: Fondazzjoni Kreattivita'	Teatru Malta Staġun 2018/2019: Teatru Malta	Toi Toi 2018/2019: Teatru Manoel Education Programme	Valletta Design Cluster 2018/2019: Valletta Cultural Agency
Production of The Year	De-terminated: The Abortion Diaries: Herman Grech	Repubblika Immakulata: Du' Theatre	Stitching: Unifaun Theatre Productions	VII (Sette): Teatru Malta	Music in Malta: From Prehistory to Vinyl Exhibition: Fondazzjoni Patrimonju Malti
Best International Achievement	Nico Conti	Mara / Rave and Behave: The New Victorians	Voyager: ŻfinMalta	Nocturnal Artefacts: Luke Azzopardi	Mizzi Studio
Best Creative Enterprise	Mizzi Studio				Moveo Dance Company
Young Artist of the Year	Gabriel Buttiġieġ	Jeremy Grech	Jessica Ellul		Andre’ Agius
Artist of the Year	Adrian Buckle	Manuel Cauchi	The New Victorians	Trevor Borg	Julian Mallia (Julinu)
Award for Innovation	Malta Bus Reborn: Mizzi Studio	sensitIV: Chris Muscat	Sette (VII): Teatru Malta and New Victorians	MACC: Allura Limited	GawGaw A Panto in the Dark: Teatru Malta
Audience's Choice Award	Il-Kbir Għadu Ġej: Balzunetta Productions	Julinu's Radioactive Ravioli: Julian Mallia	The Jew of Malta: MADC (Malta Amateur Dramatic Club)	VII (Sette): Teatru Malta	2.0 Watts in the Dark: Andre’ Agius
Lifetime Achievement Award					Charles ‘Ic-City’ Gatt
Honour for Cultural Promoters					Bank of Valletta
Honour for Artistic Legacy					L-Għaqda Każini tal-Baned

The 2021 Premju għall-Arti covered projects, productions and activities in the cultural and creative sectors between 1 March 2020 and 11 January 2021, a period affected by public health measures introduced in response to the COVID-19 pandemic. During the fourth edition, nominees were recognised not only for the quality of their work but also for their resilience, innovation and efforts to engage with the community under challenging circumstances.

The ceremony, originally scheduled for 7 April, was postponed to 28 June due to pandemic-related restrictions. It also was streamed without an audience.

2021 - Fourth Edition
Award	Nominess				Winners
Best Initiative during COVID-19 Pandemic	Stejjer waqt il-Kwarantina: Davinia Bugeja	Song Reborn: Schola Cantorum Jubilate	Toy Piano Project: OUT OF THE CAGE and other performances: Tricia Dawn Williams	Mill-Kċina ta' Connor: Tyrone Grima	Artz ID: Maria Galea
Best Production during COVID-19 pandemic	Transformations and Translations: Luke Azzopardi	Victoria International Arts Festival: Victoria International Arts Festival Foundation	Il-Kunċert tal-President għas-Sena l-Ġdida: The Malta Philharmonic Orchestra and Festivals Malta	Chamber Fridays: The Malta Philharmonic Orchestra	Festival Żiġużajg 2020: Fondazzjoni Kreattività
Honour for Artistic Career					Karmen Azzopardi
Honour of Ambassador for the Arts					Kenneth Zammit Tabona
Honour for Cultural Promoters					APS Bank
Honour for Artistic Legacy.					Għaqda Ħbieb tal-Presepju: Sezzjoni Nadur

The fifth edition was held in front of a live audience for the first time since the onset of the COVID-19 pandemic. The ceremony took place outdoors at Fort St Angelo. This edition was distinctive in limiting each award category to a maximum of three nominees, rather than the usual maximum of five.

2022 - Fifth Edition
Award	Nominess		Winners
Best Work for Young Audiences	Alice in Wonderless Land: Teatru Malta and Żigużajg	ħożż il-ħsejjes: Raffaella Zammit & Elyse Tonna from the Gabriel Caruana Foundation, Wen Chin Fu from Instrument Inventors Initiative, Marvin Zammit from Mighty Box & Andrea Pullicino, for ŻiguŻajg	The Secret Garden: Valletta Cultural Agency and Lignin Stories
Young Artist of the Year	Marvic Monreal	Pearl Calleja	Anna Calleja
Best Project in The Community	fuse: The Valletta Cultural Agency	Il-Pożittivi: Culture Venture	L-Imbuljuta: A Panto in the Dark: Spazju Kreattiv, Teatru Malta and Esplora
Honour for Artistic Legacy			Karnival ta’ Malta: Festivals Malta
Award for National Artistic Excellence			Mużika Mużika: Festivals Malta
Innovation Award	Alice in Wonderless Land: Teatru Malta and Żigużajg	ŻfinMade: ŻfinMalta, Spazju Kreattiv and Valletta Cultural Agency	Zoom: Tyrone Grima, Joseph Galea and Keith Chetcuti
Best International Achievement	Charles Paul Azzopardi	Victoria International Arts Festival: Victoria International Arts Festival Foundation	The Nobodies: A Chalk Line Theatre production
Best creative enterprise	Culture Venture		Stephanie Borg
Best Artistic Programme or season	Toi Toi Season 1st October 2019- 14th March 2020: Teatru Manoel	Toi Toi Season 1st October 2020-30th September 2021: Teatru Manoel	Spazju Kreattiv – September 2020 to August 2021: Fondazzjoni Kreattività
Honour for Cultural Promoters			Mark Weingard
Artist of The Year	Francesca Tranter	Claire Tonna	Brodu
Audience’s Choice	Larinġa Mekkanika: Teatru Malta and Żigużajg	Threaded Fine: ŻfinMalta and Valletta Cultural Agency	Ħax-Xjuħ: Teatru Malta
Production of the year	Min Hi?: Teatru Malta	PROĠETT XX: Spazju Kreattiv	They Blew Her Up: Herman Grech and Spazju Kreattiv
Lifetime Achievement Award			Tanya Bayona

2023 - Sixth Edition
Award	Nominess				Winners
Best Work for Young Audiences	We're Going on a Bear Hunt: Sean Borg and Pamela Kerr	It-Teatru tal-Miskin: Saydon Studio	Mitluf Misjub: Cassi Camilleri and Vikesh Godhwani	Paramm Paramm Udjenza	Shakeshorts: Chris Dingli
Best Project in The Community	Zararti Malta Cultural Association	Il-Manuċċa ttir maż-Żmien: Kunsill Reġjonali Nofsinhar and Kunsill Lokali taż-Żejtun	Il-Programm tal-Miskin: Saydon Studio	Reġjun Kulturali tan-Nofsinhar 2023: Kunsill Reġjonali Nofsinhar	(B’) Saħħtek MCAST
Best Artistic Programme or Season 2021-2022	Spazju Kreattiv Programm 2021/2022: Spazju Kreattiv	TOI TOI Staġun 2021/2022: Teatru Manoel	ŻfinMalta Staġun 2021: ŻfinMalta	ŻiguŻajg Programm 2021: Spazju Kreattiv	Teatru Malta Staġun: Teatru Malta
Best Artistic Programme or Season 2022-2023	Teatru Malta Staġun 2022/2023: Teatru Malta	Valletta Baroque Festival: Festivals Malta	ŻfinMalta Staġun 2022/2023: ŻfinMalta	ŻiguŻajg 2022/2023: Spazju Kreattiv	Spazju Kreattiv Programme: Spazju Kreattiv
Best Production – Theatre	Shakespeare in the Garden: WhatsTheirNames Theatre	In Other Words: The Shrinking Violets	Ta' Fuqha Senduqha: Udjenza and Andre Mangion	Xi Traġedja	It-Teatru tal-Miskin: Saydon Studio
Best Production – Dance					Frida – My Two Accidents: Moveo Dance Company
Best Production – Visual Art	150 Ellis: Dr Charles Paul Azzopardi and lan Ellis	Inaction is a Weapon of Mass Destruction: Darren Tanti	LE . IVA ANGER IS A LAZY FORM OF GRIEF: Austin Camilleri	Shrine: Finding solace in the chaos of life: Alexandra Aquilina	Spaces in Suspension: Joseph Smith and Therese Debono
Best Production – Multidisciplinary	Ħassartek: Matthew Schembri	Holdfast Frontlines: Anvil Game Studios	The Band's Visit: Revamp MT	The Last Breath: Katel Delia	Decadence, Now: City of Art
Best Production – Music	NAVAL: Water Services Corporation and Jubilate Deo Choir	Rhoald Dahl's Matilda the Musical: Masquerade Malta	The Band's Visit: Revamp MT		Nomad: William Smith
Best Creative and Innovative Enterprise	Allura	Anvil Game Studios	inkontru.app: NoceMuskata	Saydon Studio	Moveo Dance Company
Young Creative Practitioner Award	Gabriel Zammit	Jeremy Grech	Matthew Bugeja	Stjanu Debono	Ann-Marie Buckle
Creative Practitioner Award	André Mangion	Matthew Joseph Casha	Philip Leone Ganado	Toni Attard	Luke Saydon
Best International Achievement	End of an Era: Joseph Smith	Holdfast: Anvil Studios Ltd	Qoxra: Matthew Joseph Casha	They Blew Her Up: Herman Grech	Urban Fabric: Open Square Collective
Award for National Artistic excellence	Drago: Teatru Malta	Il-Fidwa Tal-Bdiewa: Teatru Malta	O: Teatru Malta	Utopia: ŻfinMalta	Il-Qfil u l-Ħelsien Skont Manwel Demech: Teatru Malta
Lifetime Achievement Award					Doreen Galea
Honour for Cultural Promoters					Dame Janatha Stubbs
Honour for Artistic Legacy					Ħaġar: Heart of Gozo Museum

2025 - Seventh Edition
Award	Nominess				Winners
Best Work for Young Audiences	Diversely Typical: Moveo Dance Company	Bongu,Bejt!: Udjenza	SNOWGLOBE: Inclusive Theatre	Bootcamp to Conservatorio Rossini - Pesaro, Italy: Jessica Scerri Ellul and Banda San Giljan	Peppa Pig bil-Malti: Media Exclusive Limited
Best Project in The Community	Diversely Typical: Moveo Dance Company	Il-Każin tal-Imqarbin: Saydon Studio	The Great Dictator: Nikolai Azzopardi Productions	Opera Nova Project: Gillian Zammit and Denise Mulholland	Cospicua Short Play Festival Kunsill Lokali Bormla
Best Artistic Programme or Season 2023/2024	Cultural Programme 2023/2024 Valletta Cultural Agency	Dance Festival Malta 2024: Festivals Malta	Season Programme 2023/2024: Malta Philharmonic Orchestra	Spazju Kreattiv 2023/2024 Artistic Programme: Fondazzjoni Kreattività	ŻiguŻajg Arts Festival for Children and Young People 2023: Fondazzjoni Kreattività
Best Artistic Programme or Season 2024/2025	Season Programme 2024/2025 Malta Philharmonic Orchestra	Spazju Kreattiv 2024/2025 Artistic Programme: Fondazzjoni Kreattività	Staġun Teatrali 2024/2025 Dejjem aktar minn qatt qabel: Teatru Malta	TOI TOI Learning & Participation Programme Season 2024/2025: Teatru Manoel	ŻiguŻajg Arts Festival for Children and Young People 2024: Fondazzjoni Kreattività
Best Production: Theatre	Blanket Ban: Davinia Hamilton, Marta Vella u Chalk Line Theatre	Dear Evan Hansen: FM Theatre Productions	Kif Tgħallimt Insuq: Dù Theatre	Mid-Djarju ta’ Student fi Skola tal-Knisja: Jamie Cardona and Vikesh Godhwani	Il-Każin tal-Imqarbin: Saydon Studio
Best Production: Dance	I am Alex: Moveo Dance Company	mar: Luke Bugeja Gauci	The Other Door: Moveo Dance Company		Għajn Xtutna: Moveo Dance Company
Best Production: Visual Art	Castillo: Take//Two	Ciao Ciao: Lampa Stampa Films, Roughcut Films	Clay/Craft/Concept: Contemporary Ceramics, Ancient Histories: Gabriel Zammit	DREAM[of]LAND: Elyse Tonna u Sarah Chircop	Siġġu: Austin Camilleri
Best Production: Multidisciplinary	AKSHARA: Benji Cachia	CantaCaravaggio: Schola Cantorum Jubilate	Curious Beauty: An Alternative Costume Exhibition: Fondazzjoni Patrimonju Malti	Sustain- Delay: Kurt Buttigieg u Malta Society of Arts	Holdfast: Nations At War: Anvil Studios Ltd
Best Production: Music	Held: Claire Tonna	MELITA: Maltese Piano Music: Charlene Farrugia	Note Eterne – Omaggio a Puccini: Għaqda Nazzjonali Każini tal-Banda	Requiem for the Living: Schola Cantorum Jubilate	Il-Każin tal-Imqarbin: Saydon Studio
Best Creative and Innovative Enterprise	Bored Peach Club	Udjenza: Culture Venture	Jeremy Grech House of Tours: Jeremy Grech	Anvil Game Studios	Mid-Djarju ta’ Student fi Skola tal-Knisja: Jamie Cardona u Vikesh Godhwani
Young Creative Practitioner	Alejandro Spiteri Monsigneur	Anna Calleja	Lorella Castillo	Pearl Calleja	Jamie Cardona
Creative Practitioner Award	Andrew Borg Wirth	Elyse Tonna	Josette Ciappara	Simone Spiteri	Vikesh Godhwani Chatlani
Best International Achievement	The Naughty Carriage on the Orphan Train: Luke Saydon	Claire Tonna with Grammy Award producer Jon John Robinson: Claire Tonna	URNA: Andrew Borg Wirth, Anthony Bonnici, Matthew Attard Navarro, Thomas Mifsud, Stephanie Sant, Anne Immelé and Tanil Raif	Blanket Ban: Davinia Hamilton, Marta Vella u Chalk Line Theatre	I WILL FOLLOW THE SHIP: Matthew Attard and Elyse Tonna
Award for National Artistic Excellence	BOĊĊI – il-musical: Teatru Malta and Festivals Malta	ĠAĦAN: Teatru Malta, FCN and Heritage Malta	MICAS: Malta International Contemporary Art Space	Verdi Requiem: Valletta Cultural Agency	Mużika Mużika 2025: Festivals Malta
Unur għall-Vjaġġ Artistiku					Narcy Calamatta
Unur għall-Kawża Soċjali					Blanket Ban: Davinia Hamilton, Marta Vella u Chalk Line Theatre
Unur għall-Viżjoni Artistika					Phyllis Muscat
Unur għall-Ambaxxatur fl-Arti					Maria Galea
Unur għall-Promoturi Kultural					Rosetta Debattista
Unur għall-Wirt Artistiku					Pawlu Camilleri Cauchi
Unur għall-Karriera Artistika					Trevor Zahra
