= Valletta International Baroque Festival =

Maltese music festival (established 2013)

The Valletta International Baroque Festival is one of the largest music festivals of Malta. It was founded by its present Artistic Director Kenneth Zammit Tabona in 2013. The programmatic focus is on baroque and early music.

== History ==
Three editions of the earlier 'Manoel Baroque Festival' had been organised in 2001, 2003, and 2005, focusing on the Baroque age and founded by Rev. Prof. Peter Serracino Inglott and Prof. Denis De Lucca, then chairman and director of the International Institute for Baroque Studies at the University of Malta, together with the board and management of the Manoel Theatre in Valletta.

Since its establishment in 2013, the Valletta International Baroque Festival is held every year in January and organized by the direction of Manoel Theatre. The concerts and opera performances are presented in several Baroque buildings in the city of Valletta.

Among the artists who have performed at the festival are Mahan Esfahani, Philippe Herreweghe, Christophe Rousset, and Jordi Savall.

On 26 January 2017, Reuben Pace's Concertino for guitar, harpsichord and orchestra was premiered at Manoel Theatre under the slogan Inspired by Baroque with the Malta Philharmonic Orchestra under the direction of Michelle Castelletti as well as the soloists Johanna Beisteiner (guitar) and Joanne Camilleri (harpsichord). It was the first world premiere during the Valletta International Baroque Festival and signaled an artistic expansion of the festival's programme to contemporary works inspired by baroque music.

== Recent Programmes and Highlights ==
2025 Edition

The thirteenth edition ran from 9 to 25 January 2025, drawing over 5,000 attendees to 32 concerts. Notable performances included:

- La Giuditta by Alessandro Scarlatti (Valletta Baroque Ensemble)
- Soprano Samuel Mariño with Concerto de’ Cavalieri
- Malta Philharmonic Orchestra with violinists Charlie Siem and Carmine Lauri
- A special concert celebrating William Christie’s 80th birthday with Les Arts Florissants.

2024 Edition

The twelfth festival was held from 11 to 28 January 2024, with more than 30 concerts in venues including St John’s Co-Cathedral, Verdala Palace, and Teatru Manoel. Notable performances included:

- Bach’s St John Passion (Valletta Baroque Ensemble & KorMalta)
- Robin Pharo
- Zefiro Ensemble
- Holland Baroque with Wu Wei
- Vox Luminis
- The Rock Troupers with their BaRock concert
- Closed with Pergolesi’s La Serva Padrona (children’s adaptation)

2023 Edition

The eleventh festival ran from 11 to 29 January 2023 and included 36 concerts across approximately 20 Baroque venues throughout Malta. Notable performances included:

- Valletta Baroque Ensemble & KorMalta, conducted by Christian Curnyn (Dettingen Te Deum)
- Soloists such as Mahan Esfahani, Charlie Siem, and Avi Avital
- The Rock Troupers with Valletta Baroque Ensemble (BaRock)
- Palisander Recorder Quartet
