= Reuben Pace =

Maltese composer (born 1974)

- Born: 1974 (age 51–52); Malta
- Occupation: Composer
- Website: https://www.reubenpace.com/

Reuben Pace (born in 1974) is a Maltese composer.

== Life ==
Reuben Pace was educated at University of Malta as well as Bangor University, where he received his PhD in 2012. One of his teachers was Charles Camilleri. During his studies he began working with the technique of morphing and out of that developed his individual style of composing.

Pace's works are interpreted by internationally famous orchestras and ensembles. On 26 January 2017 his Concertino for guitar, harpsichord and orchestra was premiered at Manoel Theatre under the slogan Inspired by Baroque with the Malta Philharmonic Orchestra under the direction of Michelle Castelletti as well as the soloists Johanna Beisteiner (guitar) and Joanne Camilleri (harpsichord). This was the first world premiere in the history of the Valletta International Baroque Festival. In 2015 Pace's music was presented at the festival Mdina Biennale. Some of his compositions were also played by the BBC National Orchestra of Wales and Duke Quartet. Reuben Pace produced and wrote the music for Blat: The Island Fortress, the first opera film in Maltese history (released in 2022).

== List of works (incomplete) ==
- 2010: Missa Brevis for Solo soprano, solo tenor and double choir (a cappella)
- 2011: L-Ahhar Moll (The Last Quay) for soprano, tape, live diffusion and video
- 2012: Back from the stars for Flute, cello and piano
- 2013: Fil-Qosor for clarinet in B flat and piano
- 2014: Wehidna (We, Alone) for String Quartet
- 2014: Il-Grajja ta' Vitorin for Mezzo-soprano and piano
- 2015: Versus for chamber choir, solo boy soprano, solo soprano, solo mezzo-soprano, solo tenor, solo baritone
- 2016: Concertino for guitar, harpsichord and orchestra
- 2018: Mdina Suite for guitar solo
- 2022: Blat: The Island Fortress (opera film, Malta)
