= Castelletti =

Castelletti is a surname of Italian origin. Notable people with this surname include:

- Michelle Castelletti (born 1974), Maltese conductor, singer, and composer
- Sergio Castelletti (1937–2004), Italian professional footballer and manager
