= Palazzo Montalto =

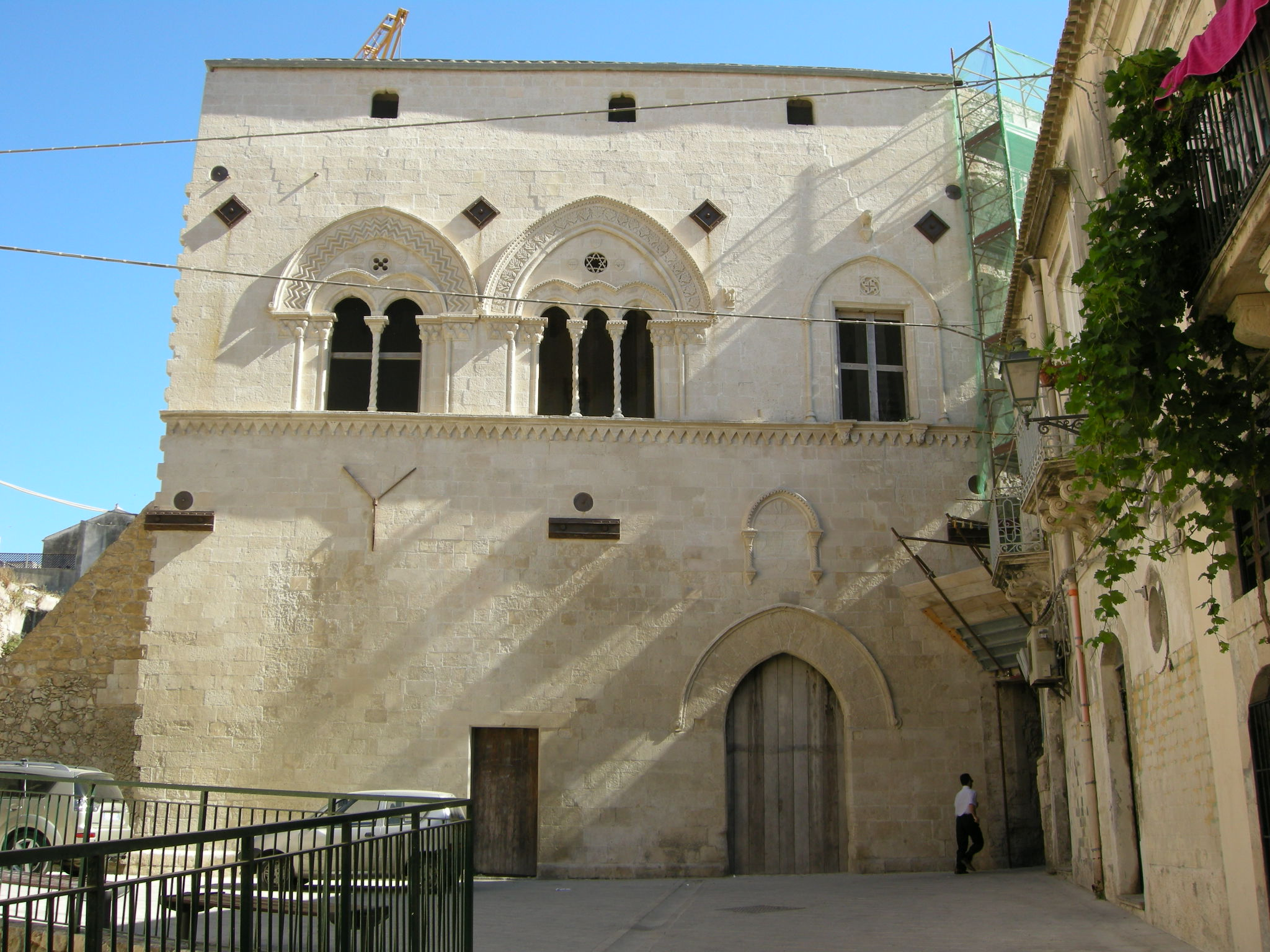
- Façade of Palazzo Montalto
- Alternative names: Palazzo Mergulese-Montalto

General information
- Status: Intact
- Type: Palace
- Architectural style: Chiaramontan Gothic
- Location: Ortygia, Syracuse, Sicily, Italy
- Completed: 1397

Palazzo Montalto, also known as Palazzo Mergulese-Montalto, is a late 14th-century palace on the island of Ortygia in Syracuse, Sicily.

== History ==
The palace was built in 1397 for Maciotta Mergulese. This is commemorated by the following inscription on the façade:

Haec Mirgulensis Macciotta Palatia Struxit Cui Suarum Summa Virtutum Copia Surgit Anno Milleno Tercenteno Nonageno Septeno Mundo Verno Veniente Supremo

In the 15th century, the Queen of Aragon gave the palace to Filippo Montalto. It was used as a temporary hospital during a cholera epidemic in 1837, and it was used by the Figlie della Carità in 1854.

== Architecture ==
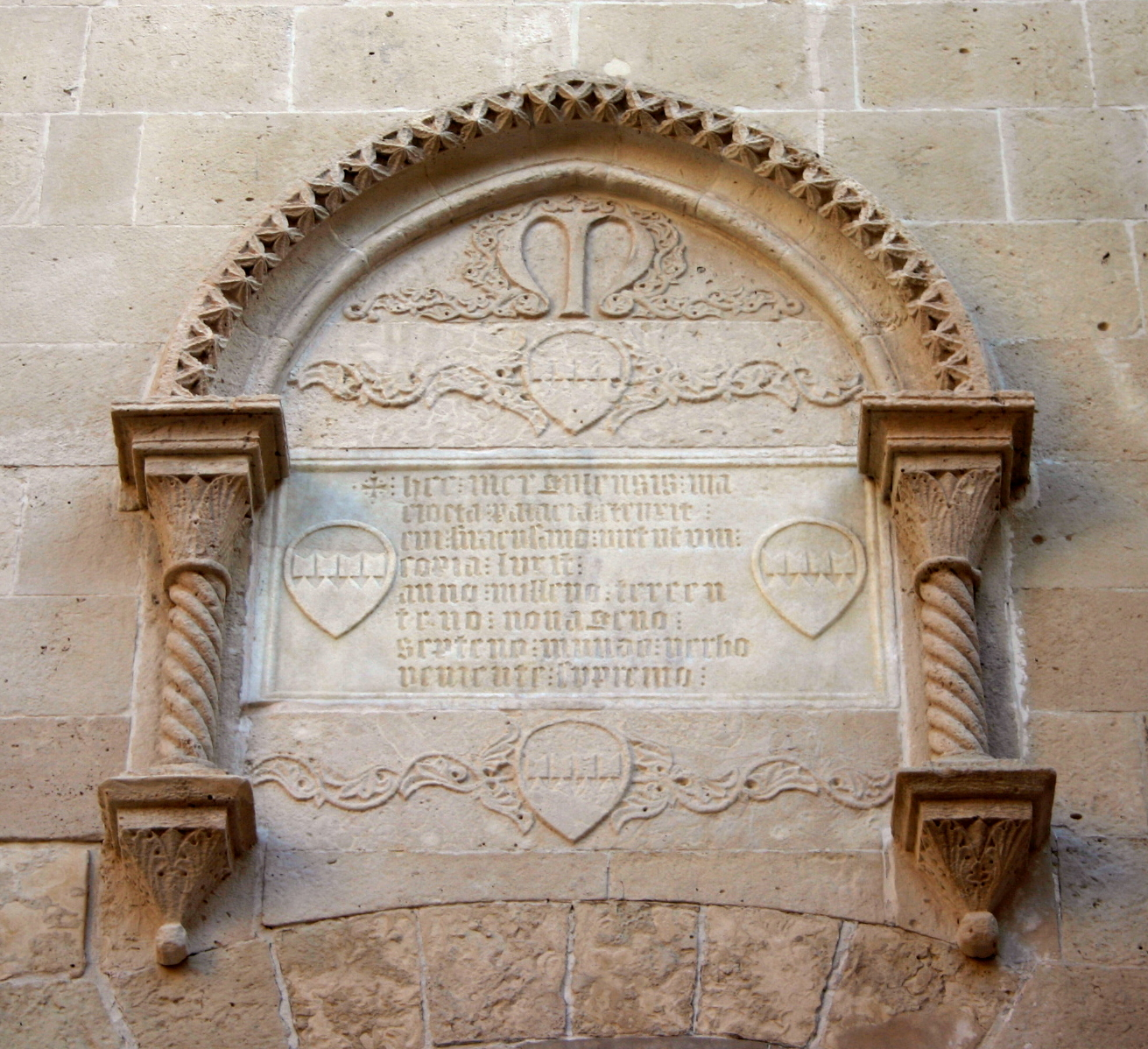
The aedicula containing the inscription

The palace is built in Chiaramontan Gothic architecture. Its façade is characterized by a number of mullioned windows decorated with flower motifs. It also has a palline losanghe cornice, similar to the one found at Palazzo Falson in Mdina, Malta.

The portal is topped by an aedicula containing a marble slab with an inscription and the date of construction.
