= Michelle Castelletti =

Maltese conductor, singer and composer

Michelle Castelletti (born 1974) is a Maltese conductor.

Michelle Castelletti has studied at the University of Malta, Canterbury Christ Church University, and New College, University of Oxford. She worked with orchestras such as the Malta Philharmonic Orchestra, BBC Philharmonic and Hallé Orchestra. On 26 January 2017, she conducted the world premiere of Reuben Pace's Concertino for Guitar, Harpsichord and Orchestra at Manoel Theatre during the Valletta International Baroque Festival. Castelletti is currently the artistic director of the Malta Arts Festival and the Royal Northern College of Music.
