= Palazzo Falson =

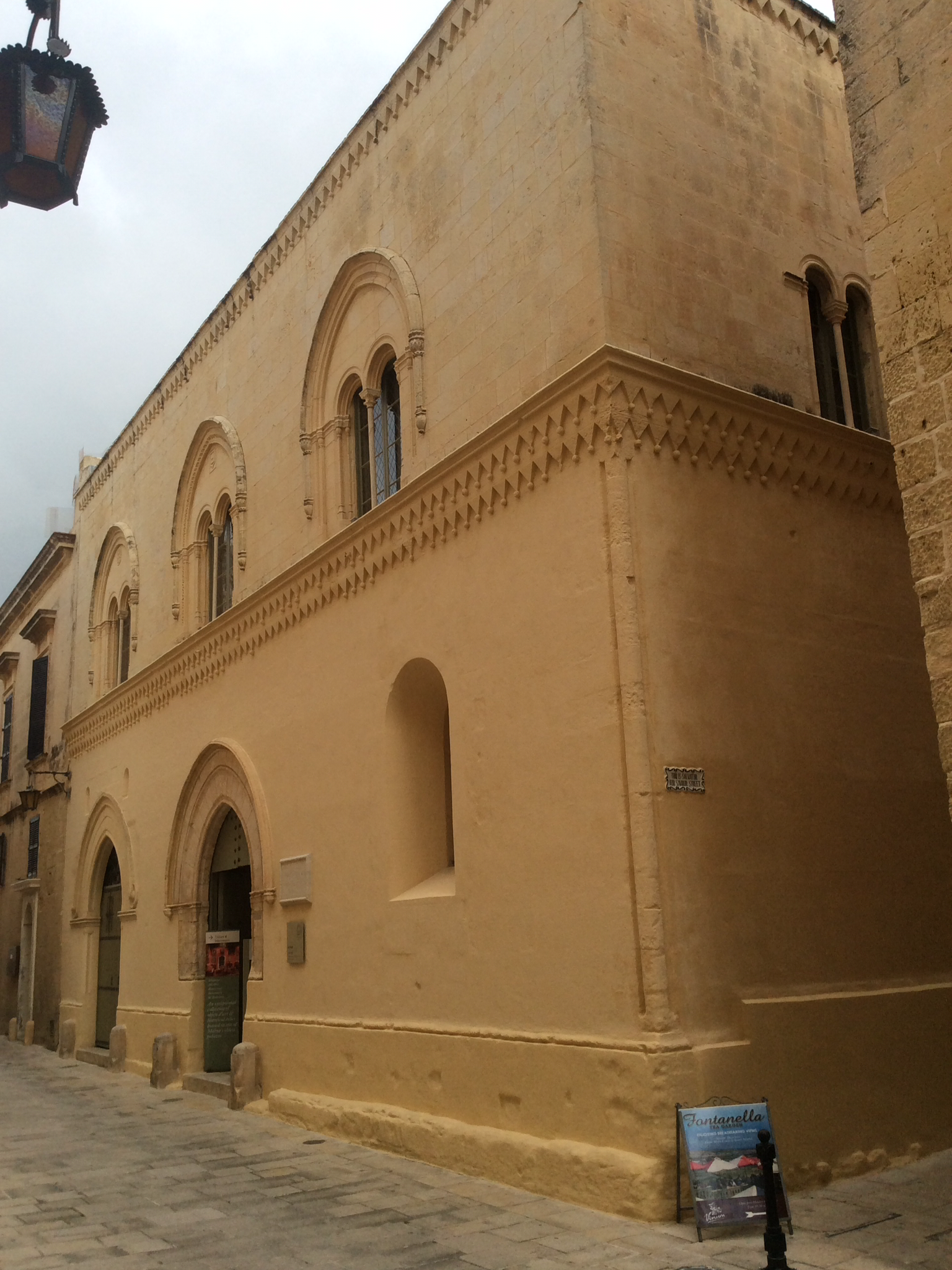
- Façade of Palazzo Falson
- Interactive map of the Palazzo Falson area
- Former names: Palazzo Cumbo-Navarra; Casa dei Castelletti; Norman House

General information
- Status: Intact
- Type: Residence used as a historic house museum
- Architectural style: Siculo-Norman
- Location: Mdina, Malta, Villegaignon Street
- Coordinates: 35°53′13.2″N 14°24′11.2″E
- Current tenants: Fondazzjoni Patrimonju Malti
- Named for: Falson family
- Construction started: c. 1495 (Note: Probably incorporating parts of an earlier building dating back to the 13th century.)
- Completed: 16th century
- Renovated: 1929
- Owner: The Captain O.F Gollcher O.B.E. Art and Archaeological Foundation

Technical details
- Material: Limestone
- Floor count: 2

Website
- palazzofalson.com

Palazzo Falson, formerly known as Palazzo Cumbo-Navarra, Casa dei Castelletti, and the Norman House, is a medieval townhouse in Mdina, Malta. It was built as a family residence by the Maltese nobility, and is named after the Falson family. It is presently open to the public as a house-museum with seventeen rooms of historic domestic belongings and a number of antique collections.

The building is believed to have been built around 1495, probably incorporating parts of a 13th-century building. This makes it the second oldest building in Mdina, after the ground floor of Palazzo Santa Sofia. During the rule of the Order of St. John, the building might have received Philippe Villiers de L'Isle-Adam, the first Grand Master in Malta. The building was further enlarged in the mid-16th century. Its architect is unknown, but the distinctive upper floor windows might be the work of Jacobo Dimeg.

Palazzo Falson was acquired by Olof Frederick Gollcher in the 20th century, and he restored and altered parts of the building. It is now owned by a foundation established by Gollcher, and since 2007 it has been open to the public as the Palazzo Falson Historic House Museum, which is managed by the Fondazzjoni Patrimonju Malti, a Maltese heritage foundation. It displays permanent collections which originally belonged to Gollcher, and occasionally other temporary exhibits from private collections.

The building was included on the Antiquities List of 1925. It has been a Grade 1 scheduled property since 1992, and is on the list of the National Inventory of the Cultural Property of the Maltese Islands.

== History ==
The Falsone (Note: Various spellings of the surname now known as Falzon were used over the centuries, including Falczono, Falczun, Falczuni, Falson, Falsone, Falsono, Falsuni, Falzono, Falzuni, Fanchuni, Fauzon, Fauzoni and Fauzuni.) family was one of the prominent families of medieval Mdina, and its members were often involved in the city's municipal affairs. The earliest recorded reference to the family dates back to 1299.

The site of Palazzo Falson was originally occupied by a building known as La Rocca. By the 13th century, a single-story house had been built, and eventually a synagogue existed on the site. According to Quentin Hughes, the ground floor of the present building was built in around 1495, probably incorporating parts of the synagogue. Changes to the façade, including a shift in the orientation of the building as well as the addition of a double serrated string course and the hood mould framing the main doorway were completed at this point. These features are typical of the Siculo-Norman style, prevalent in the period.

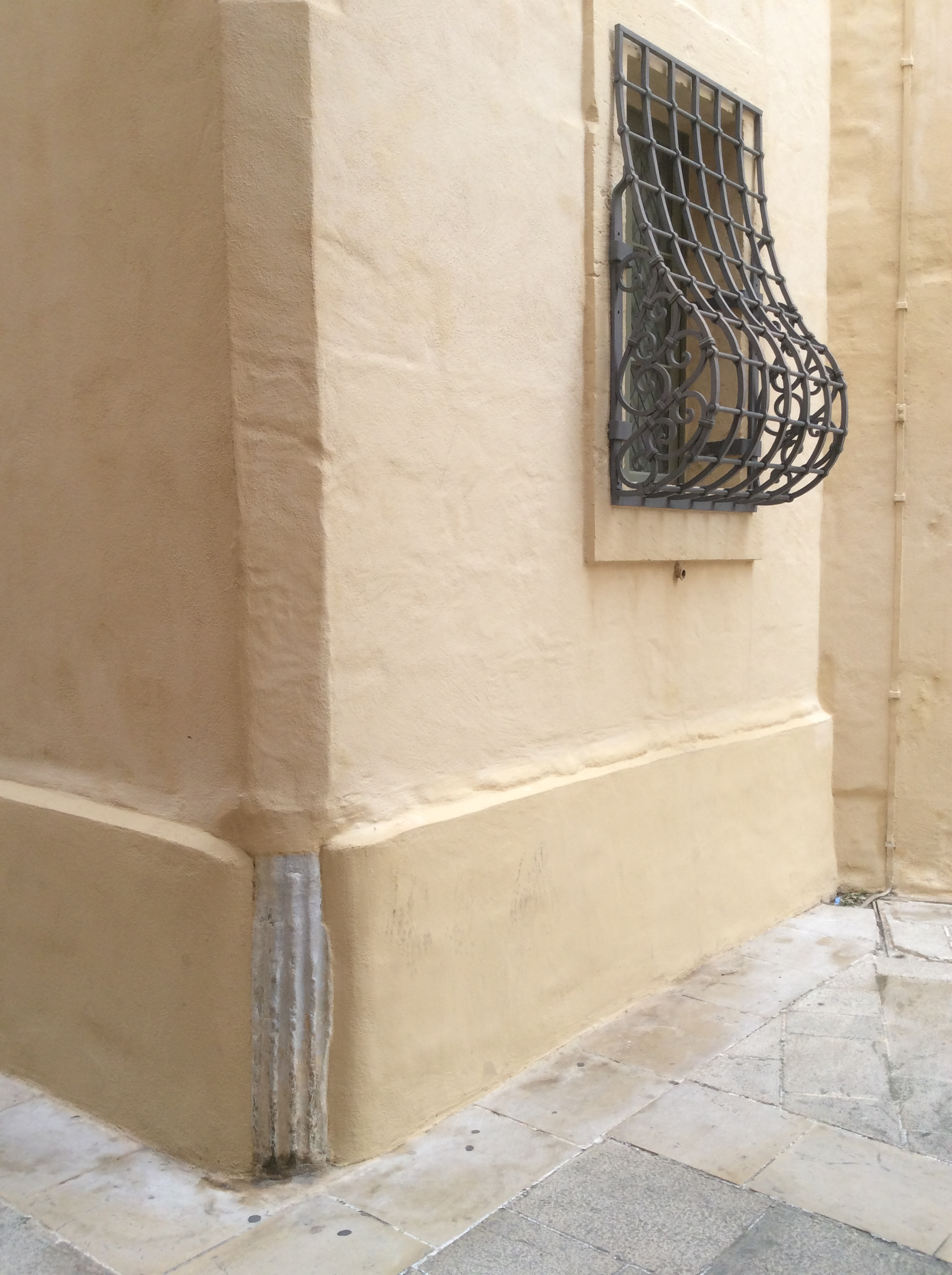
Reuse of a Roman column (lower-left) and a pregnant window (upper-right), both as part of the rear façade

According to tradition, soon after the arrival of the Order of St. John in Malta, Grand Master Philippe Villiers de L'Isle-Adam visited the palace for a banquet after a ceremony in which he took possession of Mdina on 13 November 1530. L'Isle-Adam's visit to the Falsone residence in Mdina is documented by Giovanni Francesco Abela in his 1647 book Della Descrittione di Malta, and until recently, the residence in question was assumed to be Palazzo Falson. However, there is some uncertainty as who owned the palace at the time. Documents suggest that the building originally belonged to the Cumbo family, and that the main branch of the Falsone family never owned the palace. On the other hand, some sources claim that in the 16th century the building was owned by Ambrosio de Falsone, Head of the Town Council, and in 1524 it was inherited by his cousin, Vice-Admiral Michele Falsone. The latter is said to have made further changes to the building including the addition of mullioned windows on the second floor. These windows are sometimes known in Italian and Maltese architecture as bifora. The decorative windows were probably designed by the local architect Jacobo Dimeg (1464-1527). The palace's piano nobile is believed to have been added in the mid-16th century.

The building eventually passed to Matteo Falson, who was the Master of the Rod. He fled to Sicily in 1574 after being persecuted by the Inquisition for his Lutheran views. The palace was seized by the Inquisition and it eventually passed to the Cumbo-Navarra family.

In 1657, the palace belonged to Ugolino Cumbo Navarra, and on his death it was inherited by his aunt Guzmana Cassar. She passed the building to her nephew Federico Falsone, who was not a member of the main branch of the family and who probably never lived at the palace. The building eventually passed into the hands of the Muscati-Falsone-Navarra family, and by the 1920s it belonged to Count Francesco Palermo Navarra Bonici, a resident of Catania. Throughout the centuries a number of changes were made to the house, including a reduction in the size of the building by separating it into more than one tenement.

In 1927, Olof Gollcher and his mother purchased part of the palace from Count Navarra Bonici for £680, and he later bought the remaining part of the palace in 1938 for £550. Gollcher was an art collector, and he transferred his collections into the palace, which he called The Norman House since at the time its architectural features were considered to be Siculo-Norman. In 1929, the palace's façade was restored, but it was also modified in the process. Parts of the interior were also altered. The most significant changes Gollcher made can be seen in the courtyard where he built a Siculo-Renaissance inspired external staircase, as well as a pseudo Siculo-Norman fountain and a Byzantine-Romanesque folly. He also added a pointed-arched doorway to complement the main portal of the façade.

The palace is scheduled as a Grade 1 national monument, and it is also listed in the National Inventory of the Cultural Property of the Maltese Islands.

=== Olof Gollcher ===
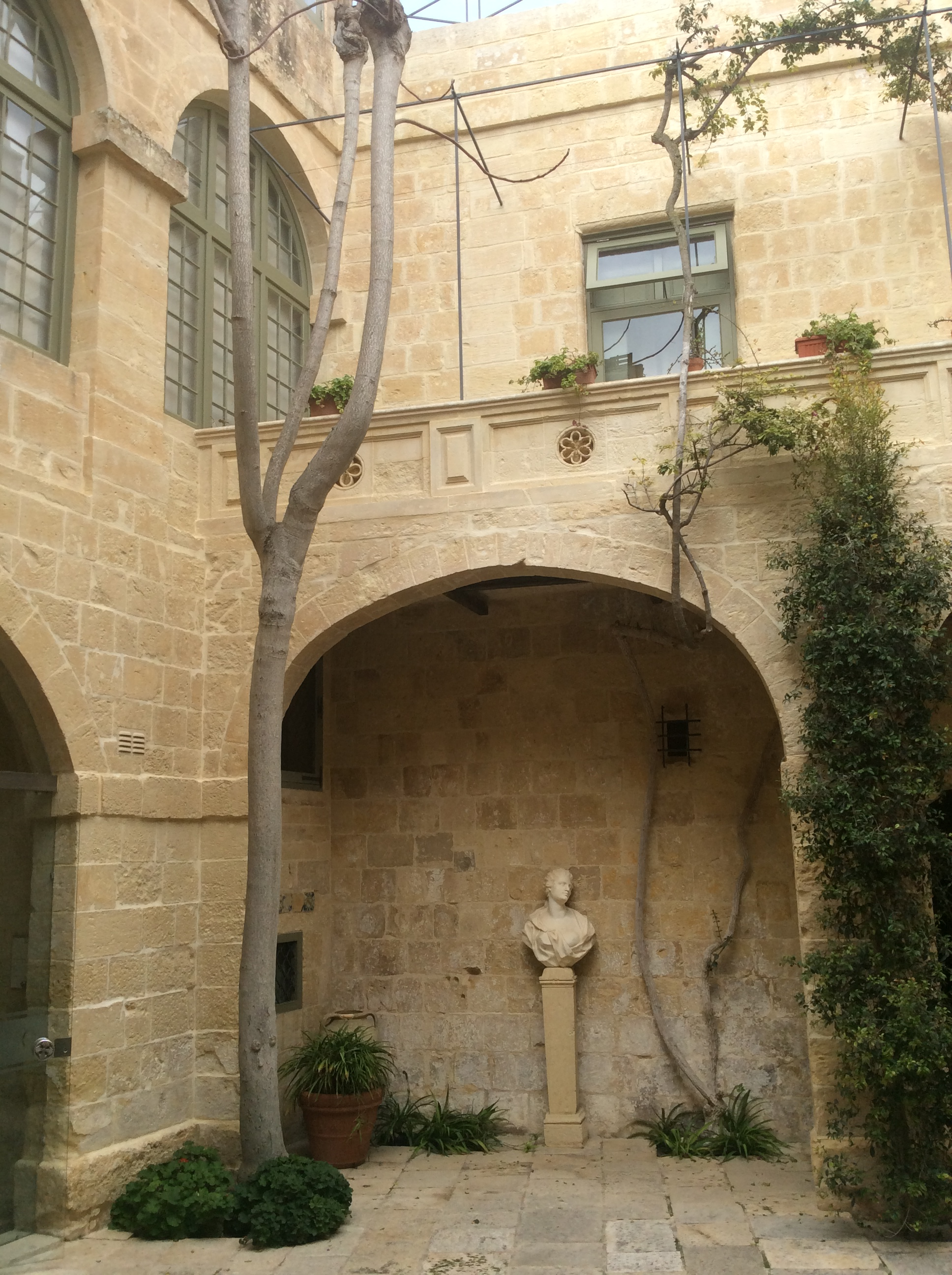
The yard or garden

Olof Frederick Gollcher was born in Valletta in 1889 to Chevalier Gustav Gollcher (1854-1922) and Elisa Gollcher née Balbi (1857-1935). The family was of Swedish descent and owned a shipping business which still operates in Malta today, under the name of The Gollcher Group.

In 1914 Gollcher joined the British Army and subsequently served in both World Wars, gaining the rank of captain in 1945. In 1936 he was named Knight of Grace of the Order of the Hospital of St. John of Jerusalem. A year later he was appointed Officer of the Most Excellent Order of the British Empire (OBE). In 1947 he married Teresa ‘Nella’ Lucia née Prior (1890-1962). Nella, was an officer in the Nursing Division of St. John's Ambulance, later becoming an Honorary Secretary.

Gollcher was a keen collector, artist and cultural enthusiast. His vast collection includes paintings, furniture, Oriental carpets, silver, books and jewellery. He was also a member of Malta's Antiquities Committee and secretary to both the International Institute of Mediterranean Archaeology and The Malta Underwater Archaeological Branch. A number of archaeological items are presently exhibited at the museum.

Capt. Gollcher intended the house and its collection to be opened to the public. After his death, in 1962, both were eventually made over to the Captain O F Gollcher OBE Art and Archaeological Foundation, but it was not until 2001 that restoration on the house and the collections began. The museum opened its doors to the public in 2007 and continues to operate under the management of Fondazzjoni Patrimonju Malti.

=== The museum and its collection ===
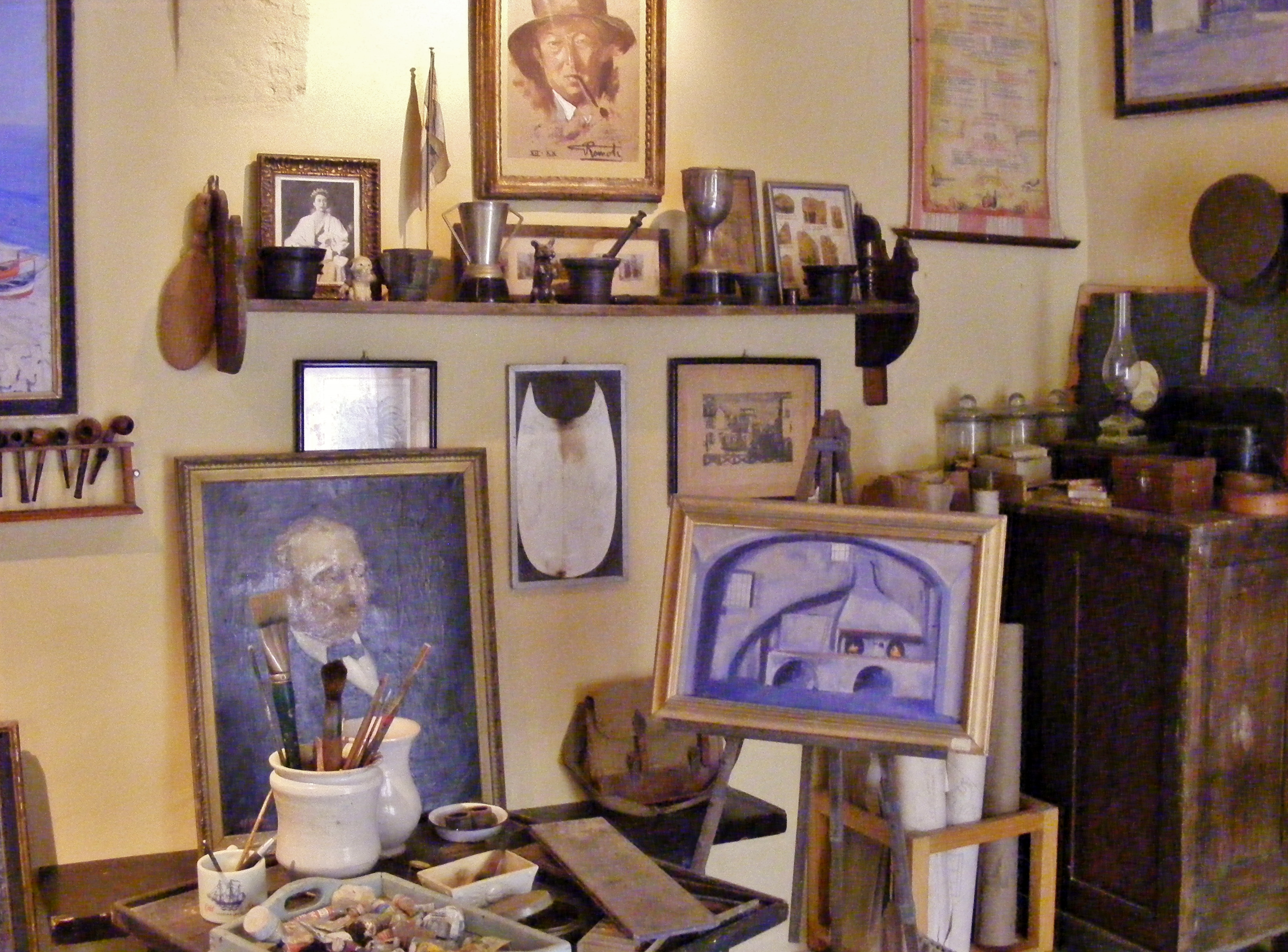
The Studio at Palazzo Falson

The museum is divided into 17 rooms that aim to create the atmosphere of a home. They include a Kitchen, an Armoury, a Carpet Gallery, as well as Capt. Gollcher's Library, Studio and Study.

One of the rarest items in the museum, is the 10-hour French Revolution-era time piece. This watch is one of only three such watches that are known to survive by the maker Robert Robin (1742-1799). It is numbered the 2nd in the series. Robin had been King Louis XVI’s (r.1774-1791) favourite watch maker, but at the introduction of the Revolution’s Decimal time he produced this watch.

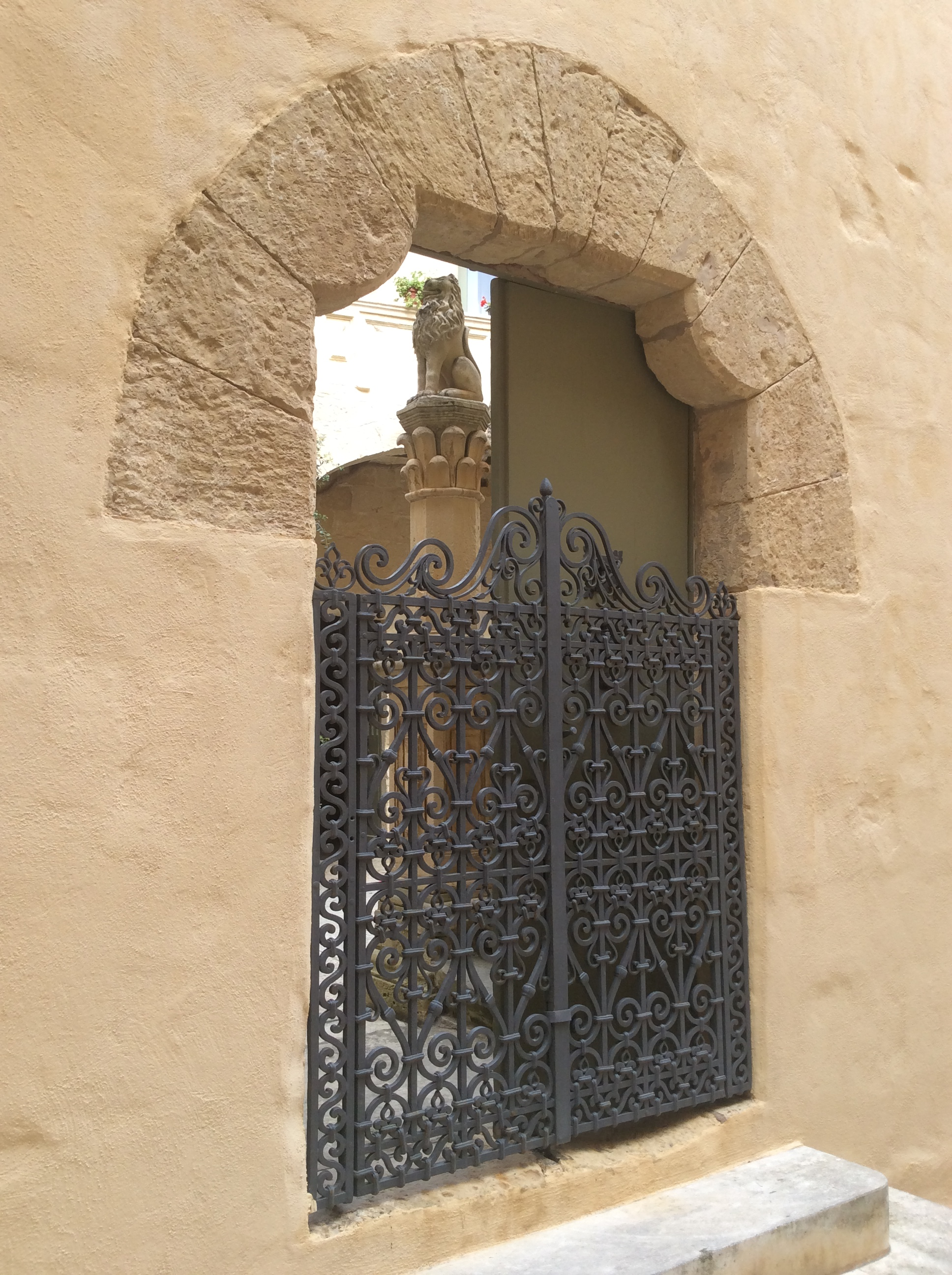
Secondary entrance and exit

Other items of particular note include the painting Portrait of a Boy attributed to the Spanish baroque artist Bartolomé Esteban Murillo (1617-1682); four small pictures representing the Four Seasons traditionally attributed to the French painter Nicolas Poussin (1594-1665), and a landscape ink and wash sketch by the British 19th century artist and poet Edward Lear (1812-1888) made during one of his stays in Malta. Engravings of importance include a series by Italian baroque artist Salvator Rosa (1615-1673).

The collection is not just limited to paintings and the decorative arts, but he also collected typical household objects or items of unique historical interest. One of the more intriguing items is a chastity belt, originally believed to have been worn during the Middle Ages as a sign of a woman’s fidelity while her husband was away at war. Nowadays the chastity belt is commonly thought to be a Victorian fabrication, and an item of curiosity.

The museum also has some Maltese earthenware containers traditionally used to cook rabbit stew. They are known as ‘Il-Baqra’ which translates to ‘the cow’ in Maltese and refers to the shape of the pot resembling that of a cow. These pots have today fallen out of use.

Gollcher had an extensive silverware collection, varying from decorative figurines to coffee pots and other tableware. Two large silver Nefs form part of the collection. A nef, or silver ship, would have been placed at the dinner table, not just as a decorative item but to contain and dispense salt, pepper and other spices down the table. At times, they were also used to hold napkins or cutlery.

==== The Library ====
Over his lifetime Capt. Gollcher amassed a collection of 4,500 books and manuscripts, presently still to be found in the library of the museum. This impressive collection has been catalogued and the titles can be viewed on the website. A number of books have also been digitised in collaboration with the Hill Museum & Manuscript Library of Saint John’s University, Minnesota (U.S.) and one can view the digital versions upon special request.

The collection covers a wide variety of subjects that reflect Capt. Gollcher’s varied interest, in art history, biographies and the two world wars, to mention but a few. He also collected Melitensia books (ie. books about the Maltese Islands or written by Maltese authors or published in Malta) including Giacomo Bosio’s 1594 Dell’Istoria della Sacra Religione and its update by Bartolomeo Del Pozzo.

Another well-known book within the palazzo's rich collection is a travel guide named “Baedeker’s Northern France”, published in 1894. The Baedekers, have published more than 1.000 different editions for travellers, setting the standards for clarity and accuracy in maps. Besides, one can find a leather-bound 9th edition of Encyclopædia Britannica, published in 1875 and the History of the Knights of Malta (1728).

==== Temporary exhibitions ====
Palazzo Falson regularly holds temporary exhibitions which highlight particular objects from Capt. Gollcher’s collection that are complemented by artefacts loaned from other museums and private collections in Malta. The exhibitions are generally accompanied with the publication of a catalogue and a calendar of activities - such as gallery talks and children’s workshops.

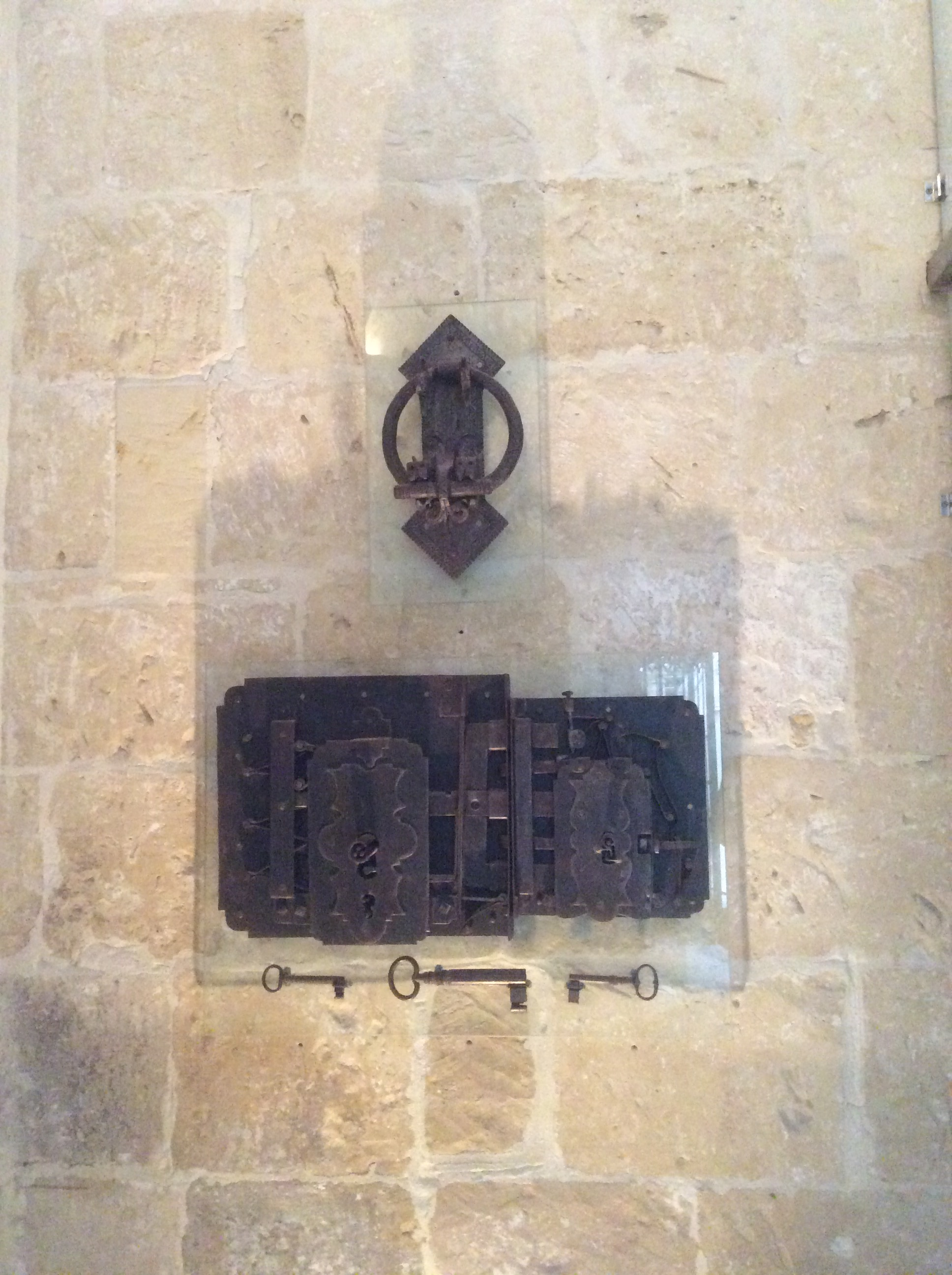
Remains of the original door of the building, on permanent display

The first exhibition, held in 2009, was titled Whistles: From Rituals to Toys. A total of 150 different whistles were included in the exhibition, highlighting the varied uses of whistles throughout history. The exhibition included whistles ranging from antique Maltese whistles to bird calls as well as more modern examples. The exhibition was guest-curated by music historian Anna Borg Cardona.

An exhibition on pipes followed in 2010. Smoking pipes had particular significance in Gollcher’s life. He belonged to a group of artists that called themselves the Confraternità della Pipa (Brotherhood of the Pipe). This group held regular exhibitions and festive gatherings. The exhibition was titled Pipes: From Habit to Art and brought together over 160 pipes showcasing the history of pipes from all around the world. The exhibition was curated by Francesca Balzan.

The 2011 exhibition was dedicated to scent bottles. Titled Scent Bottles: From Ceremony to Seduction, it showcased over 250 examples sourced from local private and museum collections. The exhibition was guest-curated by Joseph Galea Naudi.

The exhibition Edward Lear: Watercolour and Words focused on the literary and artistic output of the British artist, poet and author Edward Lear, and was held in 2014. The show was dedicated primarily to Lear’s stay in Malta and married his water colours with his corresponding diary entries, highlighting the unique personality of the artist. The exhibition was guest-curated by John Varriano, Professor Emeritus of Art History at Mount Holyoke College, Massachusetts who published a book about Lear in Malta in conjunction with the exhibition.

In 2015 the exhibition Watches: Timekeepers to Trendsetters dealt with the theme of antique watches. The exhibition was guest-curated by David Thompson, former senior curator of Horology at the British Museum. The exhibition brought together over 50 watches and a specially commissioned animation about French decimal time.

The exhibition Snuff Boxes: From Accessories to Objets d’Art opened in 2016. It brought together 200 snuff boxes and related artefacts, sourced from museum, ecclesiastical and never-seen-before private collections in a show that charted the history of the snuff box from the most stunning examples to the variety of boxes that were created to hold the once precious powder, snuff. The exhibition was curated by Francesca Balzan.

== Architecture ==
Palazzo Falson has two stories, and it is built around a central courtyard. The ground floor is built in a vernacular style, possibly incorporating part of an earlier synagogue. The piano nobile is more ornate. The façade has Spanish influences, having a number of mullioned windows in the Catalan style. A two-tiered palline losanghe cornice separates the ground floor from the first floor, while a similar cornice but with a single tier is located at roof level. These cornices are similar to those found at Palazzo Santa Sofia in Mdina and Palazzo Montalto in Syracuse. There are also comparisons to Palazzo Maria in Sicily.
