= Joanne Camilleri =

Maltese pianist and harpsichordist

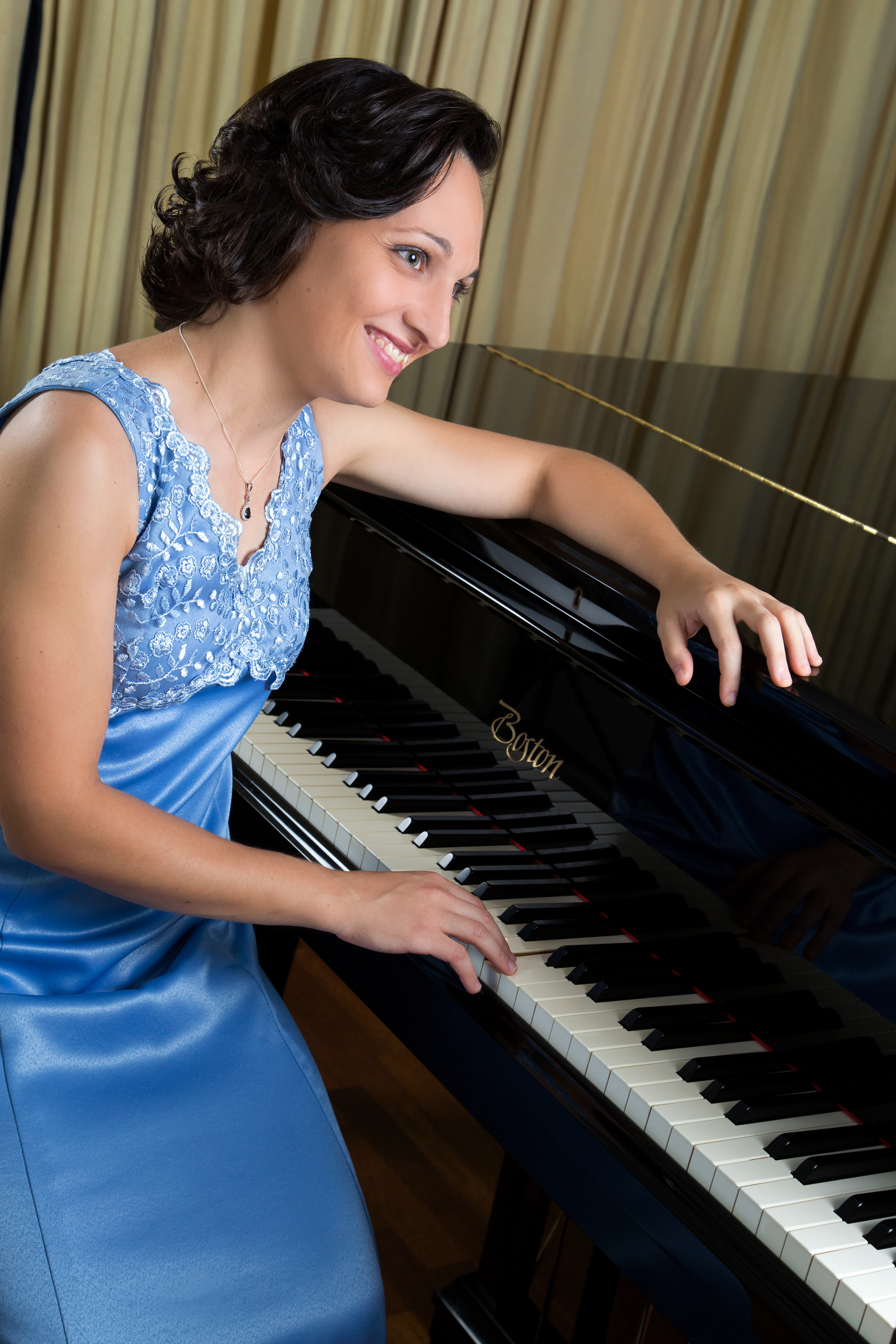

Joanne Camilleri (born 1982) is a Maltese pianist and harpsichordist.

== Musical education ==
Camilleri completed her early music education in Malta through the Associated Board of the Royal Schools of Music.

She was recommended for an international scholarship based on her Grade 8 ABRSM exam performance, but was too young to pursue it. She completed two performance diplomas from Trinity College of Music at the age of 18 and was accepted by the Royal Northern College of Music in Manchester on a full international scholarship. She was placed first in the Bice Mizzi Vassallo Music Competition, which enabled her to attend the Lake District Summer Music Academy, where she worked with international pianists and chamber ensembles.

During her undergraduate studies, she obtained a Licentiate of the Royal Schools of Music (LRSM) in Performance with a grade of Distinction. In 2004, she obtained a First Class honors Bachelor of Music degree, followed by a master's degree in performance with a Distinction grade and a Postgraduate Performance Diploma with Distinction. In 2007, she returned to Malta and became the first pianist to be awarded a Doctor of Music in Performance by the University of Malta.

== Career ==
While studying at the Royal Northern College of Music, Camilleri performed in venues around Manchester, St. Martin-in-the-Fields in London, the Isle of Man and Tunisia.

Following her third graduation at the Royal Northern College of Music, she performed as a recitalist, concerto soloist, chamber musician, and orchestral pianist in Malta and Gozo, and around Europe, the Americas and Asia.

As a concerto soloist and orchestral pianist, she has performed with the Malta Philharmonic Orchestra, the Armenian State Symphony Orchestra and British Orchestras, collaborating with conductors such as Wayne Marshall, Lancelot Fuhry, Clark Rundell, Eric Hull, Philip Walsh, Karl Jenkins, Sergey Smbatyan, Brian Schembri and Michael Laus.

As a chamber musician, she has worked with partners and ensembles including the Chamber Music International Festival (RNCM), the Malta International Arts Festival, the Three Palaces Festival and the Victoria International Arts Festival. She performed in festivals while touring in Sweden and the United Kingdom as a former member of the Camilleri Trio, with whom she premiered works which included a score for a silent film by Yasujiro Ozu.

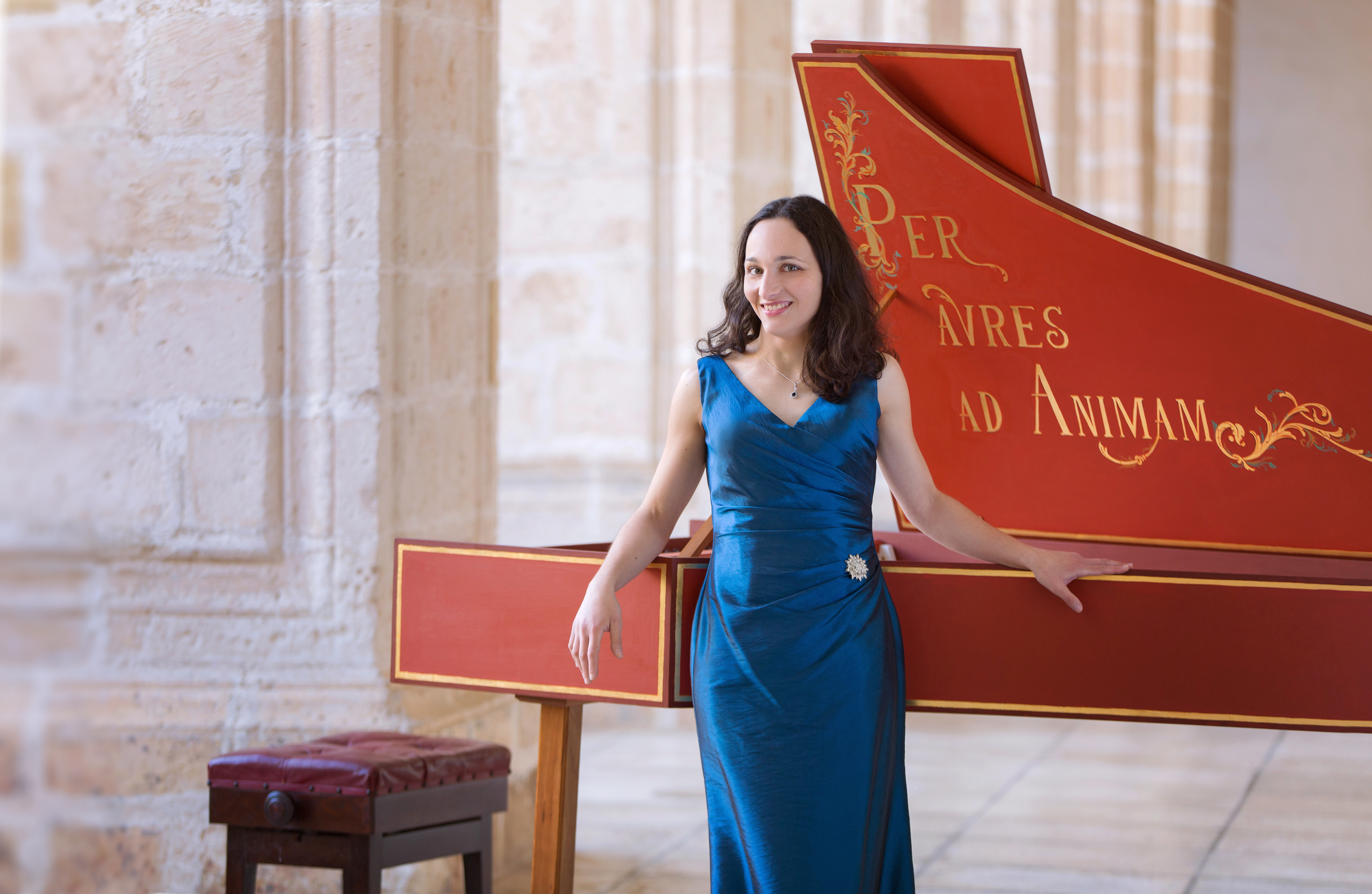
Joanne Camilleri with harpsichord

== Baroque interest ==
Camilleri has an interest in 17th and 18th-century repertoire and plays the harpsichord and organ continuo with the Valletta International Baroque Ensemble (VIBE), with whom she regularly performs. In 2017, the Ensemble toured Madrid, Paris and Berlin as ambassadors to mark Malta's EU Presidency.

As part of the Ensemble, she has collaborated with baroque music specialists such as harpsichordists James Johnstone and Nick Parle and baroque violinist Catherine Martin, and has performed at the Valletta International Baroque Festival.

Her doctoral thesis focused on Johann Sebastian Bach's Aria with 30 Variations.

Camilleri has given solo recitals dedicated to the repertoire of the Baroque era, specifically the works of J. S. Bach. She has released two solo CDs of Bach's works.

== Teaching ==
In 2006, Camilleri was a visiting piano tutor at Uppingham School in Rutland. When she was based in Malta, she joined the teaching staff at the Malta School of Music as a full-time member, teaching solo piano performance and chamber music.

She gave masterclasses for several years as part of the annual Victoria International Arts Festival in Gozo.

== Discography ==
- In Bach's Footsteps
- Bach's Goldberg Variations
- Chopin 24 Preludes Op.28
- Trio for clarinet, cello and piano by Ed Hughes

== Recording music for film ==
- Silent film directed by Yasujiro Ozu (2010)
- Storbju directed by Davide Ferrario (2020)
