= Fondazzjoni Patrimonju Malti =

Maltese non-profit

- Established: 1992
- Focus: Maltese Heritage
- Address: 63, Mint Street
- Location: Valletta, Malta
- Website: patrimonju.org

Fondazzjoni Patrimonju Malti (FPM; transl. Maltese Patrimony Foundation) is a non-profit heritage foundation in Malta. It was set up in January, 1992, with the aim to spread awareness about heritage of the Maltese islands among locals and foreigners through museums, publications, exhibs and events.

The foundation was begun by a group of individuals with different backgrounds but with a common goal of promoting Maltese patrimony. Among its displayed items are collections of objets d’art, some loaned from Maltese private collections which are temporary viewed to the general public.

FPM manages a historic house museum located at Palazzo Falson in Mdina and an art gallery dedicated to British artist Victor Pasmore. The Foundation publishes its own cultural magazine, occasional catalogues of its exhibitions, and academic literature to subjects related.

== History ==
FPM was founded in 1992, with Maurice de Giorgio serving as its first Chairman until his death in 2015. During this time, the Foundation established itself as a prominent entity within the Maltese cultural heritage sector, organising various exhibitions related to Maltese cultural heritage and opening the Palazzo Falson Historic House Museum.

== Museums ==
FPM’s first museum project began in 1997 with the setting of the Theatre Museum. Initially the Foundation organised four exhibitions on Maltese heritage with the names of Antique Maltese Clocks, The Sedan Chair in Malta, Girolamo Gianni in Malta and The Silver in Malta. These exhibitions were the precursor to a larger and more permanent museum project, namely the restoration and transformation of the Palazzo Falson Historic House Museum. This project was carried out through an agreement with The Captain O F Gollcher OBE Art an Archaeological Foundation, whereby FPM was to manage the museum and transform it into a state of the art historic house museum.

=== Palazzo Falson Historic House Museum ===
Palazzo Falson is the second oldest structure still standing in Mdina, parts of which date back to the 13th century. In 1927 the Palazzo was bought by Olof Frederick Gollcher OBE (1889–1962), a collector of objets d’art including paintings, silver, furniture, jewellery, oriental rugs and arms and armour, among others. Gollcher wanted his house to be preserved with its contents as a museum open to the general public, and in his will left instructions for the setting up of a foundation bearing his name that was to carry out this wish. Following a five-year intensive restoration exercise, Palazzo Falson Historic House Museum opened its doors to the public in May 2007. Palazzo Falson currently hosts both a permanent collection and temporary exhibitions, exhibiting artefacts and objects of relevance to Maltese cultural heritage from public and private collections.

=== Victor Pasmore Gallery ===
In September 2015, FPM took over the management of the Victor Pasmore Gallery with the aim of bringing to light the importance of Victor Pasmore and the Maltese modern art movement. Born in Chelsham, Surrey, Victor Pasmore (1908–1998) settled and worked in Malta in the second half of the twentieth century. The collection at the VP Gallery covers a wide range of Pasmore’s creations and preferred media, including drawings, reliefs and spray paintings, constructions, prints and composite works. Though not all produced in Malta, the works on display are largely representative of Pasmore’s artistic practice following the move to his village farmhouse in Gudja in 1966, and also exhibit a greater sensitivity and interest in light, colour and myth.

The gallery is situated on the site of a former gunpowder magazine, originally dating back to the period of the Order of St John, and was later rebuilt during the British period. The magazine was restored by the Central Bank of Malta and The Victor Pasmore Foundation, and was officially opened to the public on 3 November 2014.
