= Manoel Theatre =

Theatre in Valletta, Malta; third-oldest working theatre in Europe

Teatru Manoel
- Teatro Pubblico (1732–1800); Teatro Reale (1800–1873)
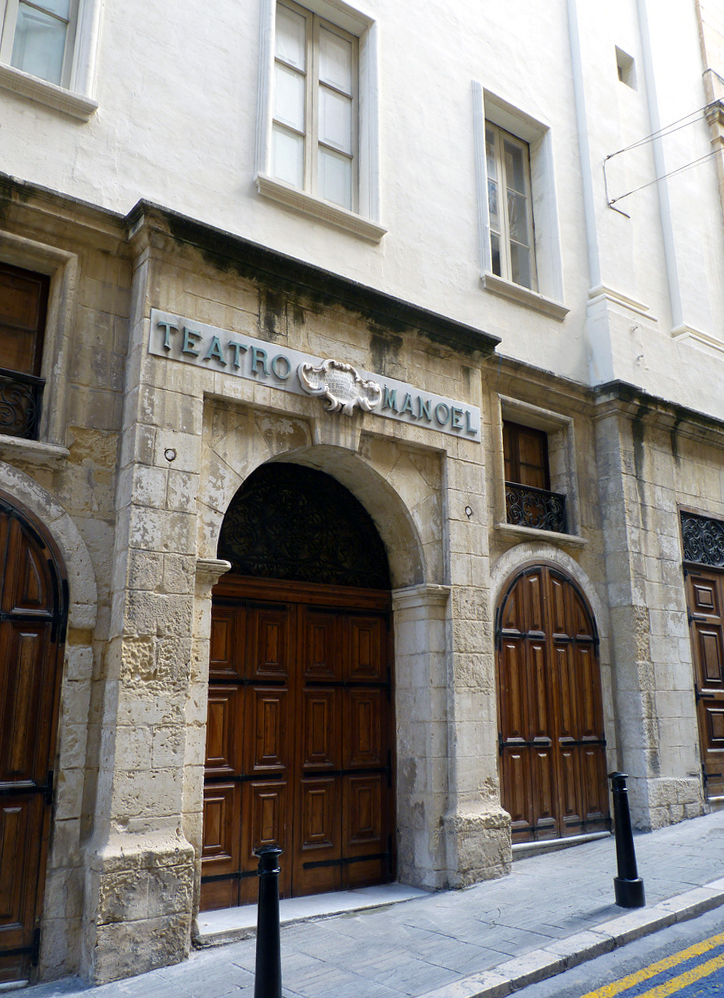
- Façade of Teatru Manoel
- Interactive map of Teatru Manoel
- Address: 115, Old Theatre Street; Valletta; Malta
- Capacity: 547
- Designation: Grade I listed building

Construction
- Opened: 1732; 294 years ago
- Years active: 1732–present
- Architects: Antonio Azzopardi and Francesco Zerafa

Website
- teatrumanoel.com.mt

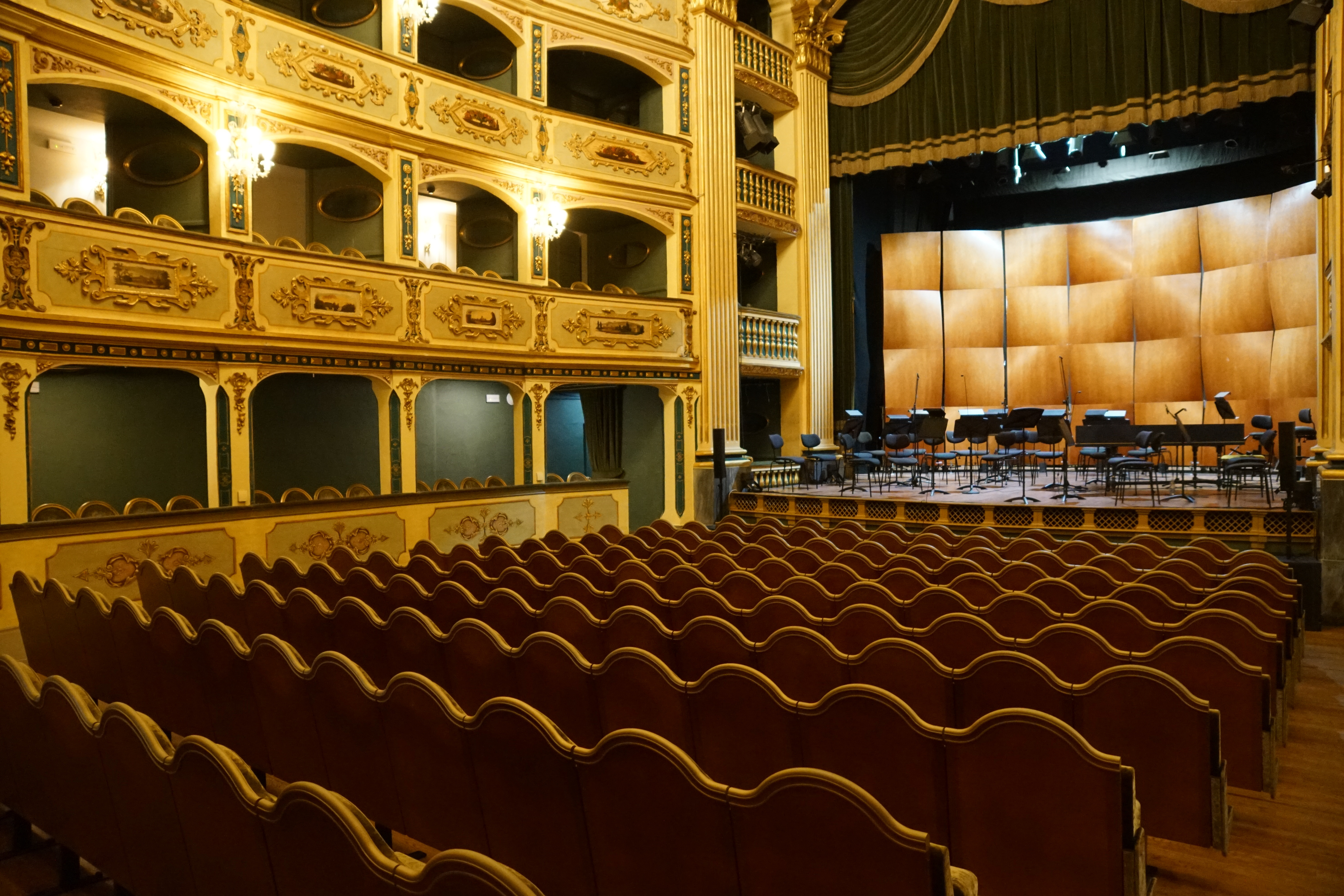
Interior of Manoel Theatre (2022).

Teatru Manoel (Maltese for "Manoel Theatre"; Italian: Teatro Manoel) is a theatre and important performing arts venue in Malta. The theatre is often referred to as simply "The Manoel", and is named after Grand Master of the Order of the Knights Hospitaller, Fra António Manoel de Vilhena, who ordered its construction in 1731. The theatre is reputed to be Europe's third-oldest working theatre (older than the San Carlo in Naples), and the oldest theatre still in operation in the Commonwealth of Nations.

The theatre is located on Old Theatre Street (Maltese: Triq it-Teatru l-Antik) in Valletta. It considers itself the country's national theatre and the home of Malta Philharmonic Orchestra (Orkestra Filarmonika Nazzjonali). Originally called the Teatro Pubblico, its name was changed to Teatro Reale ('Theatre Royal') in 1812, and renamed Teatru Manoel in 1866. The first play to be performed was Maffei's Merope.

The theatre is a small, 534 seat venue, with an oval-shaped auditorium, three tiers of boxes constructed entirely of wood, decorated with gold leaf, and a pale blue trompe-l'œil ceiling that resembles a round cupola. It was built on the ‘Teatri all'italiana’ model, that was prevalent at the time. The building is a Grade I listed building as noted by Malta's Superintendence of Cultural Heritage, and is also scheduled by the Malta Environment and Planning Authority (MEPA).

== History ==
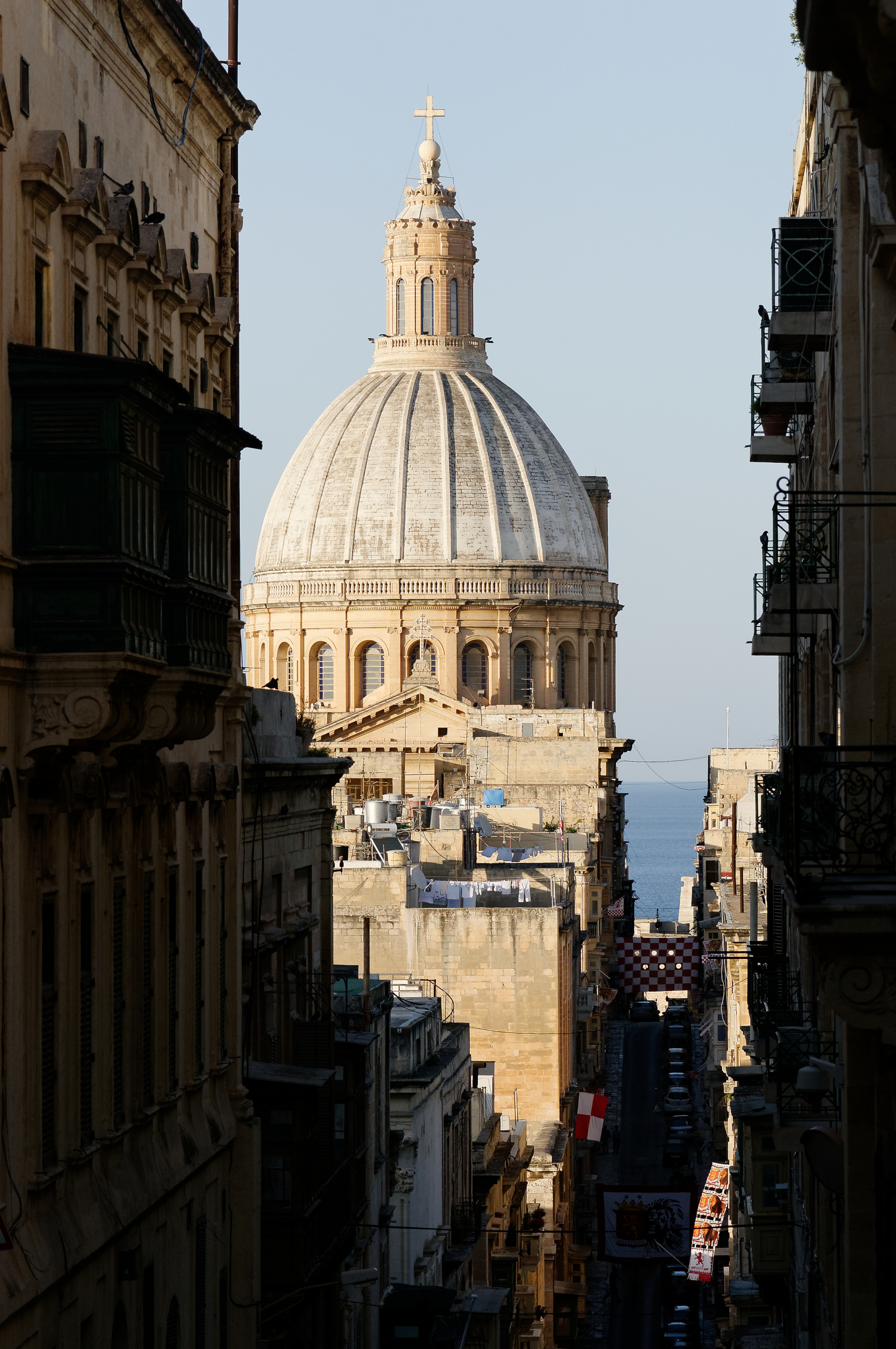
Old Theatre Street, named after Teatru Manoel

Before the construction of the theatre, plays and amateur theatrical productions were staged in the halls and piano nobiles of the Knights' auberges. These were palaces constructed for the langues of the Order. The Langue of Italy often held such entertainment, staged by its knights in their Auberge. The records of the Langue even state that, on 2 February 1697, some Maltese gentlemen presented a play in the Auberge d'Italie. Women were prohibited from attending these events after incidents during the Carnival festivities of 1639.

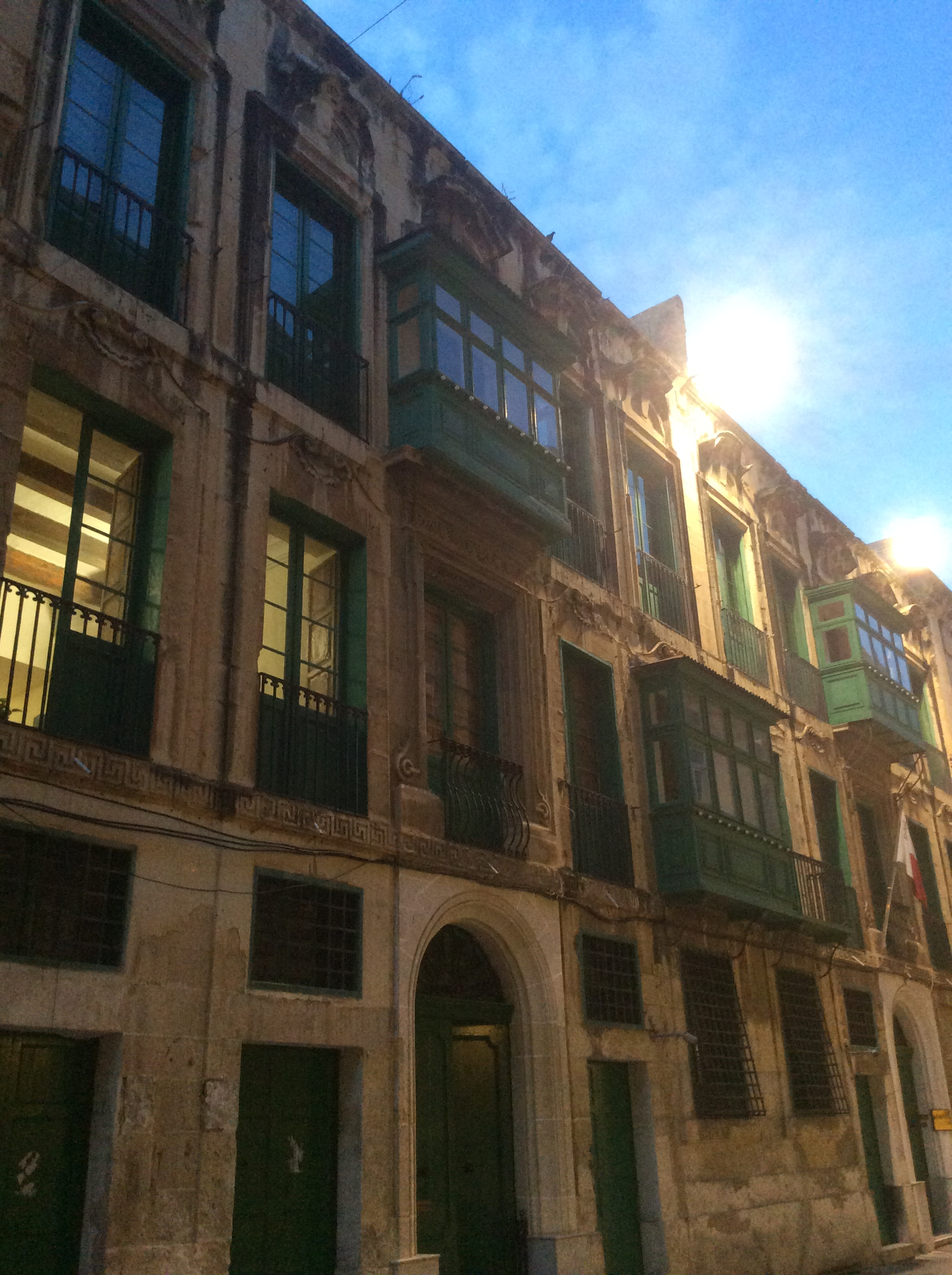
The two houses rebuilt for the Priory of Navarra, now serving as the Ministry for Home Affairs

In 1731, António Manoel de Vilhena commissioned and personally funded the construction of the building to serve as a public theatre "for the honest recreation of the people." (Note: This phrase was inscribed above the main entrance to the theatre, which still reads to this today: "Ad honestam populi oblectationem."(in Latin)) The Grand Master bought two houses from the Priory of Navarre, with a frontage on what is now Old Theatre Street for the sum of 2,186 scudi. (Note: Vilhena also paid a further 2,000 scudi for the reconstruction of the Navarrese knights' two remaining houses, which then became known as the New Priory of Navarre.) It has a plain façade, in keeping with Valletta's Mannerist style, and has three floors with a mezzanine-level above the ground floor. The façade incorporates a doorway surmounted by a stone balustraded open balcony, itself supported by three heavy scroll corbels. The interior is decorated in Rococo style. The theatre was possibly designed by Romano Carapecchia, and was built by Francesco Zerafa and Antonio Azzopardi.

Construction was finished in only ten months. This however, may be because alterations were made to the fabric of the three adjoining houses, incorporating them into a theatre. The building occupied an area of 94½ square canes, (Note: 496.31 square yards (415 m^{2})) which was later altered to 93 square canes and 2½ palms. (Note: 488.64 square yards (409 m^{2})) The theatre is said to have been modelled after the contemporary Palermo Theatre. Its auditorium was originally semi-circular or horseshoe shaped, with an illuminated parterre that served as a small dance floor. The first theatrical performance to be staged at the Teatro Pubblico was Scipione Maffei's classic tragedy Merope, on 9 January 1732. The actors in that production were the Knights themselves, and the set was designed by the Knights' chief military architect, Francois Mondion.

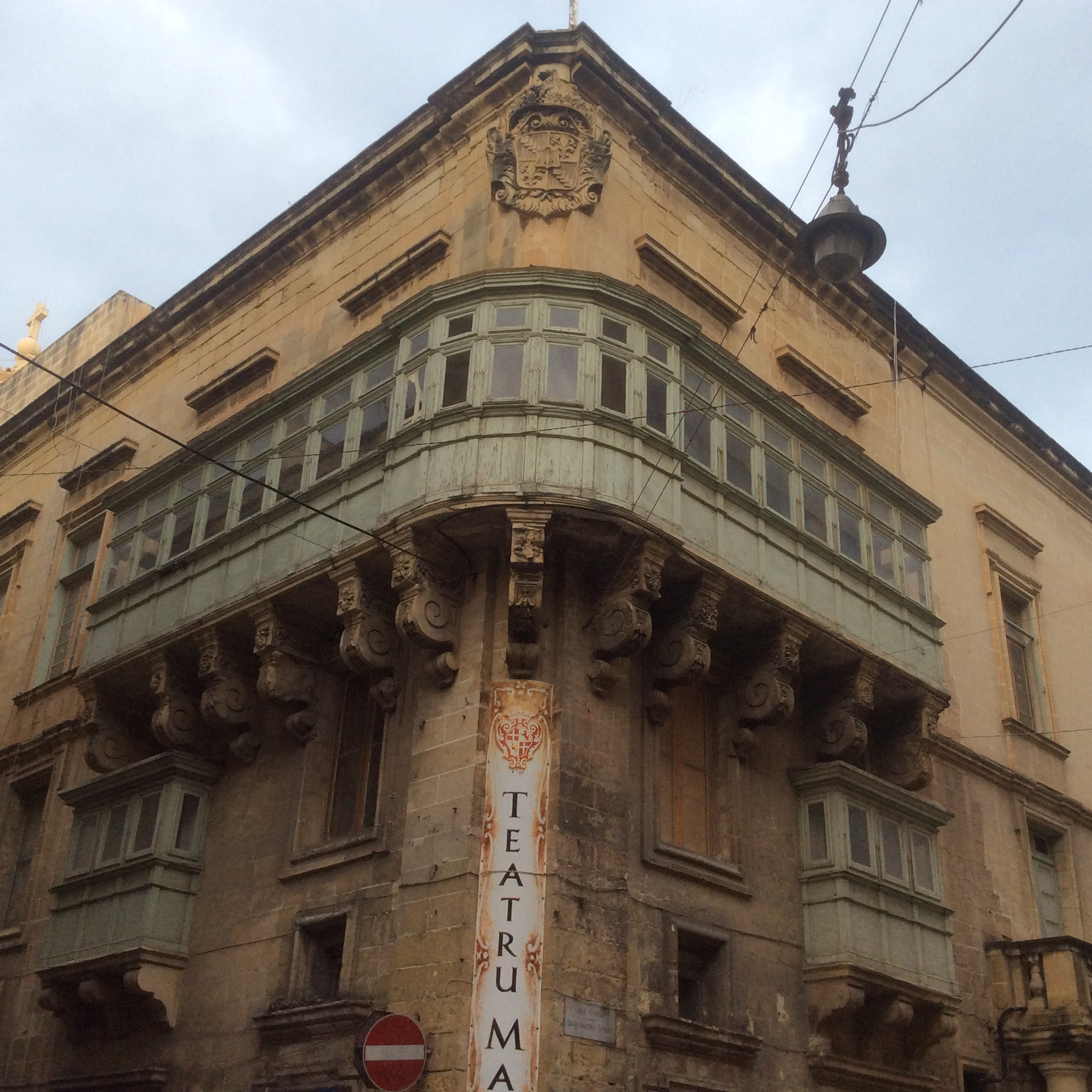
Palazzo Bonici used by Teatru Manoel until 2014

On 26 January 1732 a satirical and anti-clerical play "Il bacchettiere falso" by Girolamo Gigli was performed. On 18 January 1769 the play "Il trionfo di Minerva", by Lentisco Adrasteo was presented on the occasion of Grand Master Manuel Pinto da Fonseca's birthday. A similar honour was also given to Ferdinand von Hompesch zu Bolheim, on his elevation as Grand Master. On this occasion, Hompesch appeared on the balcony thanking the crowd, showering handfuls of gold coins on the people that had gathered to applaud. Over the course of the next half-century, it was the venue for an extensive repertoire of lyric operas performed by companies of visiting professionals or by amateur groups of knights, and French tragedies or Italian comedies. Works by Johann Adolf Hasse, Niccolò Piccinni and Baldassare Galuppi were extremely popular at the theatre during its early years.

In its early days, the management of the theatre, and censorship of its performances, was entrusted to a senior knight, known as the Protettore. The first recorded impresario was Melchiorre Prevvost Lanarelli in 1736, and the last Giovanni Le Brun in 1866. From 1768 to 1770 the impresario was a woman, Natala Farrugia. In setting up the theatre, Grand Master de Vilhena set the rent to be paid by the impresario at 320 scudi per annum, of which 80 accrued for rent from Easter to August, 120 for autumn, and another 120 scudi from Christmas to Carnival. When dances or veglioni (masked ball) were held in the theatre, the pit was raised by a scaffolding to the level of the stage. On 22 August 1778 regulations were passed for the lighting of the theatre and corridors on such occasions, with the shading of lights, in any manner, being prohibited. In 1778, to avoid scandal, theatre companies were prohibited from sleeping in the boxes of the theatre. This was a practice which was common during that time. A few years later, in 1783, the Teatro Pubblico underwent considerable modification and decoration, based on a design by the Roman architect, Natale Marini. A model was displayed before the inquisitor and many knights, and the model was so admired that the Commissioners of the Foundation of the Theatre decided to add a further two louis, as a bonus to Marini's invoice of 49 scudi.

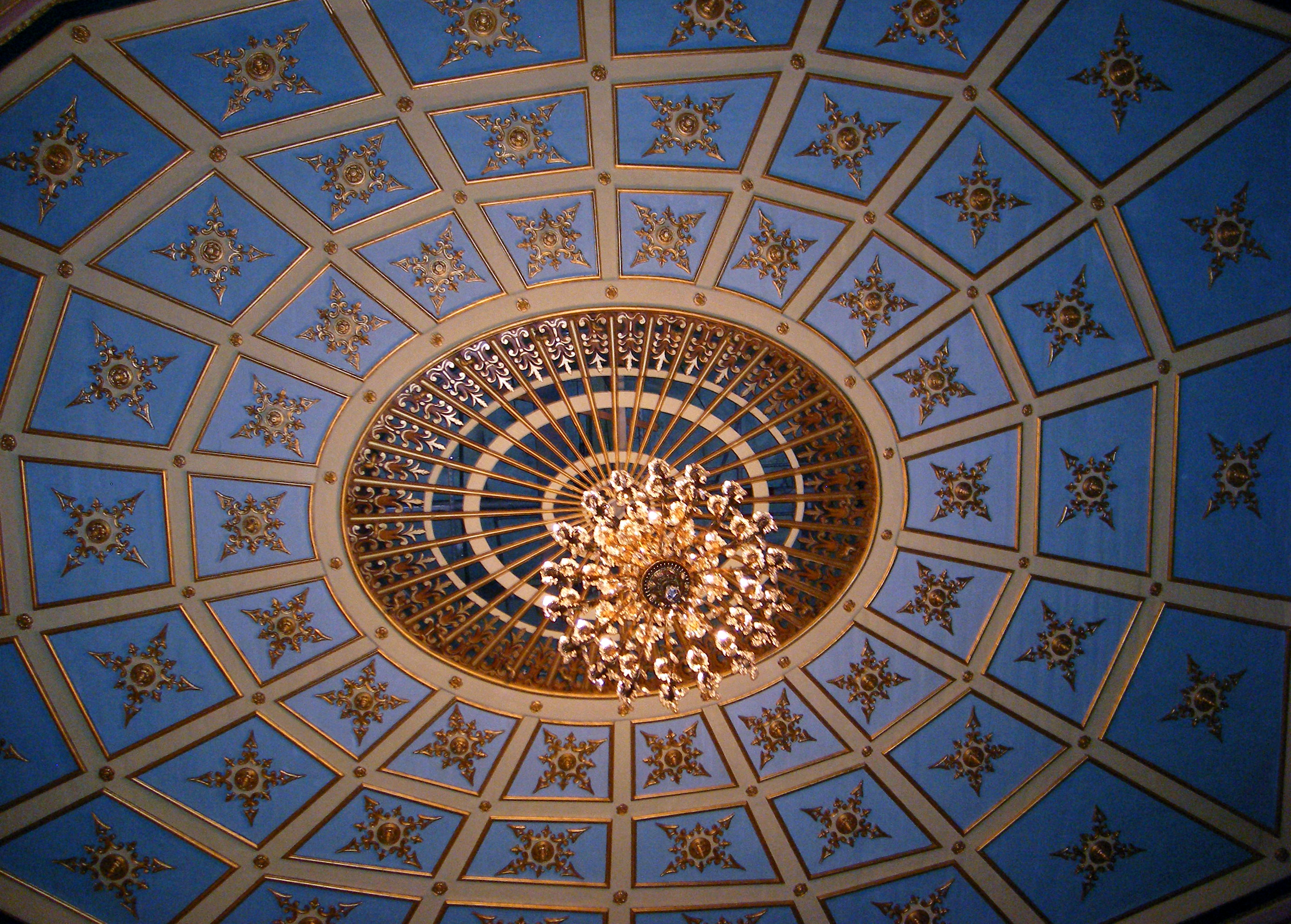
The pale blue, trompe-l'œil ceiling that resembles a round cupola.

Nicolas Isouard's first known opera, Casaciello perseguitato da un mago, was performed here in 1792, and Isouard became director of this theatre in 1798, after the French captured Malta, and continued to premiere other operas there. Several of Isouard's own works, including Avviso ai Maritati and Artaserse, were performed at the Manoel during this time. French rule over Malta was short-lived and within two years the islands passed into the hands of Great Britain. An English gentleman who accompanied Abercrombie's expedition to Egypt in 1801, wrote that:

"La Valette possesses an opera, small indeed, but neat, though much out of repair. Italy and Sicily supply it with very tolerable vocal performers, and it is a very agreeable entertainment for the garrison. It was excessively crowded every night by the officers of the expedition, to whom it was a great source of amusement. The price of admission is one shilling."

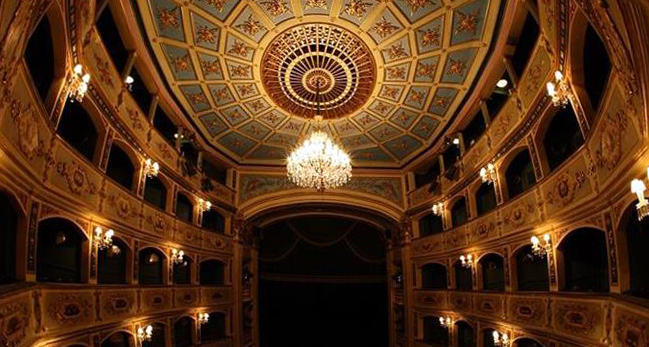
The proscenium and theatre-boxes at Teatru Manoel.

During the early British Era, the "Teatro Pubblico" was renamed as the "Teatro Reale", going through a series of enlargements and re-modellings throughout the 19th century, most notably in 1812, when Sir George Whitmore added today's gallery and proscenium, raised the ceiling by one storey, and added eight more boxes, bringing the total to 67. Whitmore also transformed the auditorium to the oval shape that it has today. Further alterations were made in 1844, when the Manoel's set designer, Ercolani, repainted the panels on the wooden boxes and had them gilded. Another stratum of silver leaf was added to the panels and ceiling in 1906. Throughout this time, the Teatro Reale was rented out to professional impresarios, who hosted nine-month opera seasons. It was visited by many foreign dignitaries, including Sir Walter Scott, and Queen Adelaide, the Queen Dowager, widow of William IV of the United Kingdom, who attended performances of Elisir d'Amore and Gemma di Vergy at the theatre, during her convalescence in Malta. Lucia di Lammermoor was given as a gala night in honour of the Queen Dowager, featuring soprano Camilla Darbois. English and Italian opera and operetta were the most popular productions at the Teatro Reale throughout the 19th century; however, the Maltese public was particularly supportive of operas by Rossini, Bellini, Donizetti and Verdi.

Elevation view of the Royal Opera House, Valletta, c. 1866.

In 1861, the Teatro Reale was given on perpetual lease, by the government, to Dr. Salvatore Mifsud and Anacleto Conti for an annual ground rent of £236,15, and in 1862, the directum dominium was sold to Emmanuele Scicluna for £7,833.6.8. Subsequent owners were Carmelo Arpa, a chemist (1889) and the Gollcher family (1906–7). The theatre had fallen into disuse in 1866, as a result of the construction of Malta's new Royal Opera House, designed by Edward Middleton Barry, on Strada Reale, at the entrance to Valletta. The theatre began to serve as a doss house for homeless and indigent citizens, who rented out the stalls for a few pennies a night. However, in 1873, the Teatro Reale – was officially renamed "Manoel Theatre", and it enjoyed a brief new lease on life when the Royal Opera House burnt down. But by 1877, the Royal Opera House had been rebuilt, and once more, Teatru Manoel was eclipsed and fell again into disuse. On 27 December 1922, 6 January 1923 and 3 February 1923, Teatru Manoel was the venue for the first public airing of Malta's National Anthem, "L-Innu Malti." During the Second World War, Teatru Manoel served as emergency accommodation for victims of the constant bombardment by the Luftwaffe and the Regia Aeronautica. In the early 20th century, it was also used intermittently as the venue for Carnival balls and, for a period of about twenty years, it operated as a movie theatre.

The theatre was included on the Antiquities List of 1925.

== Present day ==
Despite numerous alterations over the years, it retains many of its old architectural features, such as the white Carrara marble staircase, shell-shaped niches, and Viennese chandeliers. Two water reservoirs beneath the floor create an acoustic environment that is so precise that the hushed page-turnings of an orchestra conductor can be heard clearly throughout the auditorium.

Following the destruction of the Royal Opera House by Axis bombardment on 7 April 1942, Teatru Manoel was expropriated by the Government of Malta in 1956, and was quickly restored to its former glory. It reopened in December 1960 with a performance of Coppélia by Ballet Rambert. In subsequent years the theatre foyer was enlarged by means of the annexation of the adjacent Palazzo Bonici, a grand 18th century palace that was the former home of the Testaferrata Bonnici family; however on 9 January 2007, the Constitutional Court of Malta revoked the 1958 order of possession and use in respect of this property and ordered that the property be returned to its original owner. This annex currently houses the theatre's bar and restaurant.

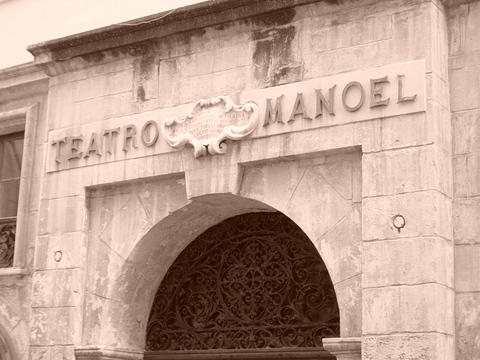
Restoration of the façade of Teatru Manoel has been a source of controversy.

The theatre is being restored by the Teatru Manoel Restoration Committee. Previous restoration attempts done in the 1970s were heavily criticised, with the removal of a balcony and the reinforcement of old stone with new masonry. The first phase of the new restoration took place in 2003, and included the restoration of the paintings on the frontispiece of the auditorium boxes. In 2004, the auditorium was restored by a team of Sante Guido Restauro e Conservazione di Opere d'Arte, who unearthed paintings that will allow the understanding of the theatre's development. This second phase included the cleaning of the gilt. The third phase included the restoration of the proscenium arch and the boxes it incorporates, while the fourth phase of the restoration project was the ceiling's restoration, which was inaugurated on 3 October 2006. Although controversial, an application to restore the theatre's façade was approved by Maltese planning and heritage supervisory bodies and was restored in 2017.

Today, Teatru Manoel continues to put on a broad variety of theatrical productions in both English and Maltese, opera, musical recitals (including lunchtime recitals in Sala Isouard), poetry recitals, dramatic readings, and an annual Christmas pantomime, produced by the Malta Amateur Dramatic Club. Management of the theatre is currently entrusted to Acting-CEO Edward Zammit, until a new artistic director has been chosen. The board is chaired by Dr. Michael Grech. Many productions are regularly presented, both by local talent and international stars, and the theatre has been a source for the cultural appreciation of the arts in Malta. Since 1960, it has had an official Management Committee and is no longer rented out for whole seasons to impresarios as in the past. The theatre's musical programmes retain some variety, but the main emphasis during recent decades has been on instrumental music.

The theatre is listed on the National Inventory of the Cultural Property of the Maltese Islands.

== World premieres held at Teatru Manoel (incomplete) ==
- 8 April 2016: The Price of One. Play by Edward Bond. Directed by Chris Cooper.
- 26 January 2017: Concertino for guitar, harpsichord and orchestra by Reuben Pace. Malta Philharmonic Orchestra, Michelle Castelletti (conductor), Johanna Beisteiner (guitar), Joanne Camilleri (harpsichord).

== Notable visitors ==
Many opera singers, musicians and troupes have graced its stage. These include Boris Christoff, Mirella Freni, Rosanna Carteri, Cecilia Gasdia, Louis Kentner, Flaviano Labò, Dame Moura Lympany, Sir Yehudi Menuhin, John Neville, Magda Olivero, Michael Ponti, Katia Ricciarelli, Mstislav Rostropovich, Dame Margaret Rutherford, Steve Hackett, Dame Kiri Te Kanawa and Sir Donald Wolfit. Visiting companies at Teatru Manoel have included Nottingham Playhouse, the Comédie-Française and the Staatsballett Berlin (Berlin State Opera Ballet).
