= Valletta Design Cluster =

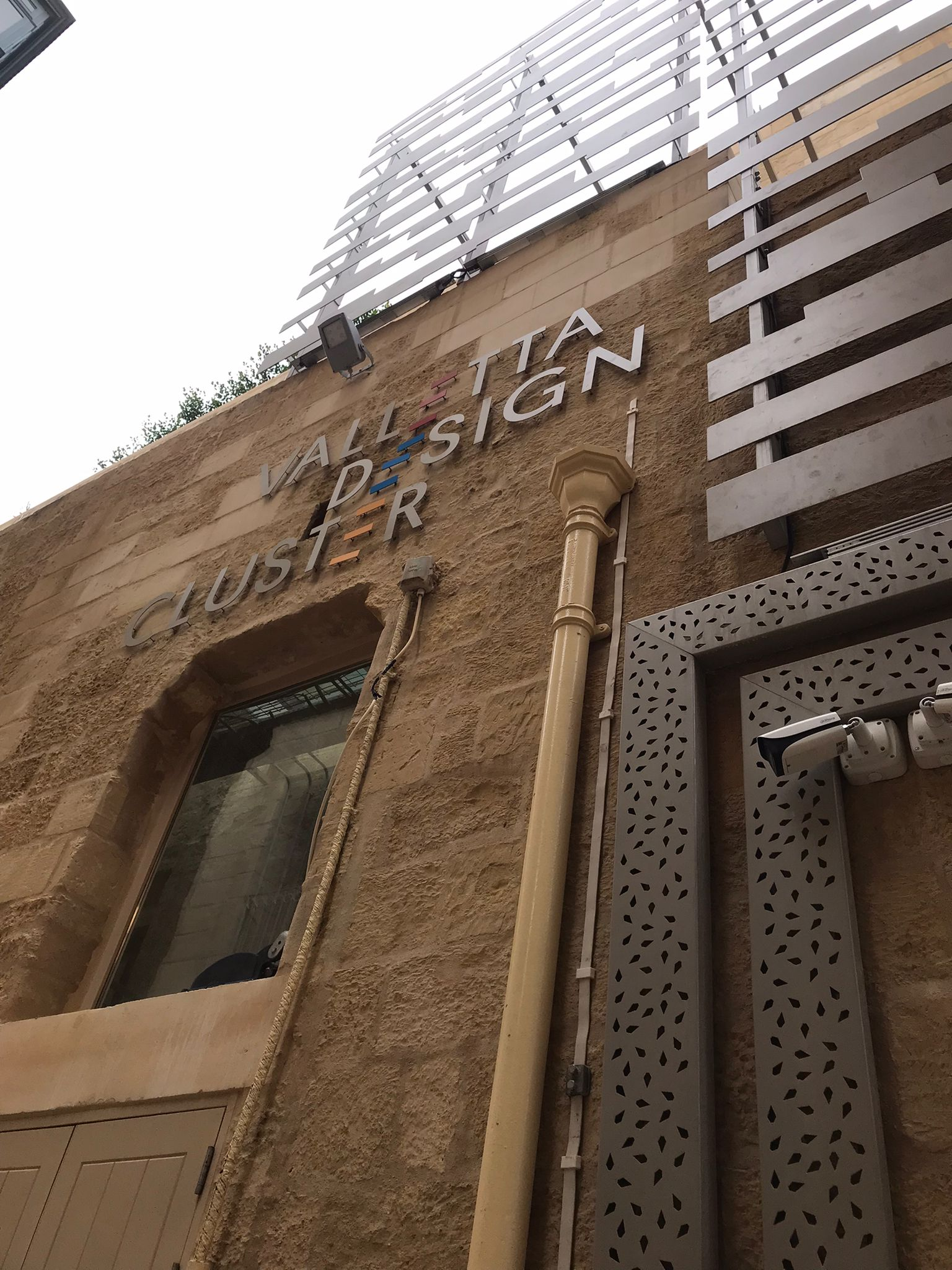
- Façade of the Valletta Design Cluster in 2021
- Interactive map of the Valletta Design Cluster area
- Former names: Old Abattoir; Old Civil Abattoir

General information
- Status: Renovated
- Type: Abattoir
- Location: Valletta, Malta
- Coordinates: 35°54′04″N 14°30′50″E
- Completed: 1636
- Renovated: 2017–2021
- Renovation cost: €10.4 million
- Owner: Valletta Cultural Agency (VCA)

Technical details
- Material: Limestone
- Floor area: 3,552 m^{2} (38,230 sq ft)

Renovating team
- Architects: Amanda Degiovanni; Tetsuo Kondo Architects (roof garden)
- Awards: Public Open Space Award (2021 MASP)

Website
- vca.gov.mt/en/valletta-design-cluster/

The Valletta Design Cluster (VDC) is a culture and creativity centre in Valletta, Malta. Inaugurated in March 2021, it is housed in a former slaughterhouse known as the Old Abattoir (Note: Also referred to as the Old Civil Abattoir by some sources.) (Maltese: Il-Biċċerija l-Antika) which was originally built in around the 17th century.

== Location ==
The VDC is located in the lower part of Valletta, at the bottom of Old Mint Street (Maltese: Triq iz-Zekka) and adjacent to the rear of Auberge de Bavière. The area had historically been neglected prior to the renovation project.

== History ==
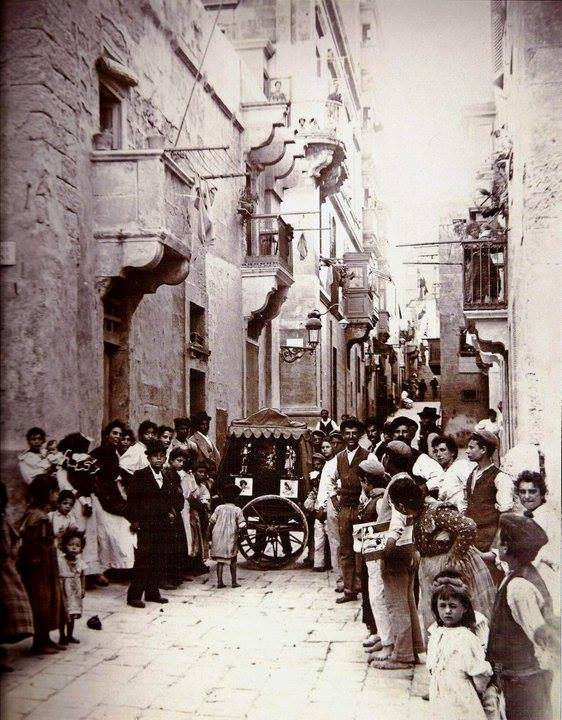
Bull Street (Triq il-Gendus) with the Abattoir in the background, as photographed by Richard Ellis, c. 1900

The building which now houses the VDC is reportedly one of the oldest surviving buildings in Valletta, and in the 17th century it was in use as an abattoir. It housed residences and soldiers' barracks in the early 18th century, and later on parts of it were used for light industries including cotton spinning and bakeries. The bakery ovens remained operational until the late 1980s and they still exist today.

Parts of the building were used as housing until the 1980s, when its residents were evicted as the site was earmarked for demolition and redevelopment into new housing units. The planned interventions were not implemented, and parts of the building were occupied by squatters. The site fell into a state of disrepair and abandonment, remaining in a dilapidated state for decades. Most of the building's roof had collapsed by the 2010s.

The conversion of the Old Abattoir into the Valletta Design Cluster was announced in June 2015, and it was one of several infrastructural works commissioned for Valletta's role as European Capital of Culture in 2018. The VDC's aim is to offer spaces for use by cultural and creative operators, and the renovation project also aimed to contribute to the urban regeneration of the lower part of Valletta. Engagement efforts made during the project's early stages involved various stakeholders including communities living in the area along with the design sector.

The project architect was Amanda Degiovanni, while the roof garden was designed by the Japanese firm Tetsuo Kondo Architects. On-site renovation works commenced in 2017. While works were ongoing, an open day was held on 15 December 2018 as one of the European Capital of Culture events. The project cost a total of about €10.4 million, including €4.3 million from the European Regional Development Fund.

The project had initially been scheduled for completion in 2018, but after several delays the planned opening date was moved to late 2019 and then to the second half of 2020. The VDC was finally inaugurated by Prime Minister Robert Abela on 24 March 2021, while its roof garden was inaugurated a month later.

At the 2021 Malta Architecture and Spatial Planning Awards held in March 2022, the Restoration Directorate and Tetsuo Kondo Architects won the Public Open Space Award for designing the VDC's roof garden and green wall.

== Architecture and layout ==
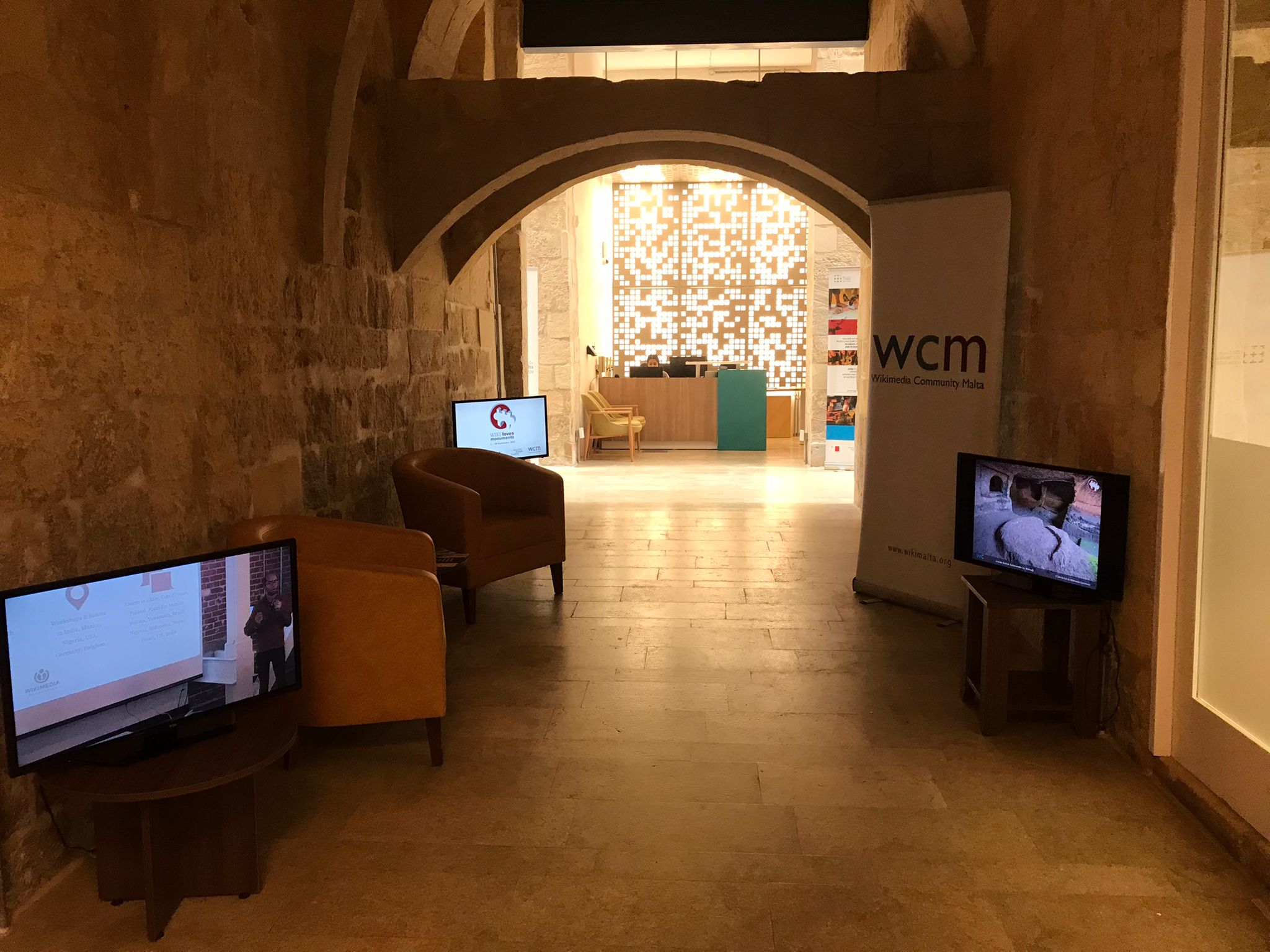
Interior of the VDC, 2021

The Valletta Design Cluster consists of two blocks separated by a long courtyard which was originally part of Old Mint Street. This area is covered by a retractable glass canopy and it has an informal layout which can be adjusted for various activities and events.

The building's ground floor includes a makerspace workshop, a coworking space and a food space which includes a teaching kitchen, a canteen and other amenities. The other floors include five meeting spaces, a conference room and fifteen studios which can be used for creative activities by long-term tenants.

Apart from the Old Abattoir itself, the Valletta Design Cluster also includes two adjacent townhouses in Bull Street (Triq il-Gendus). Known as the International Project Labs, these include accommodation and self-catering facilities for 11 people, and are meant to be used by visiting users, researchers or artists.

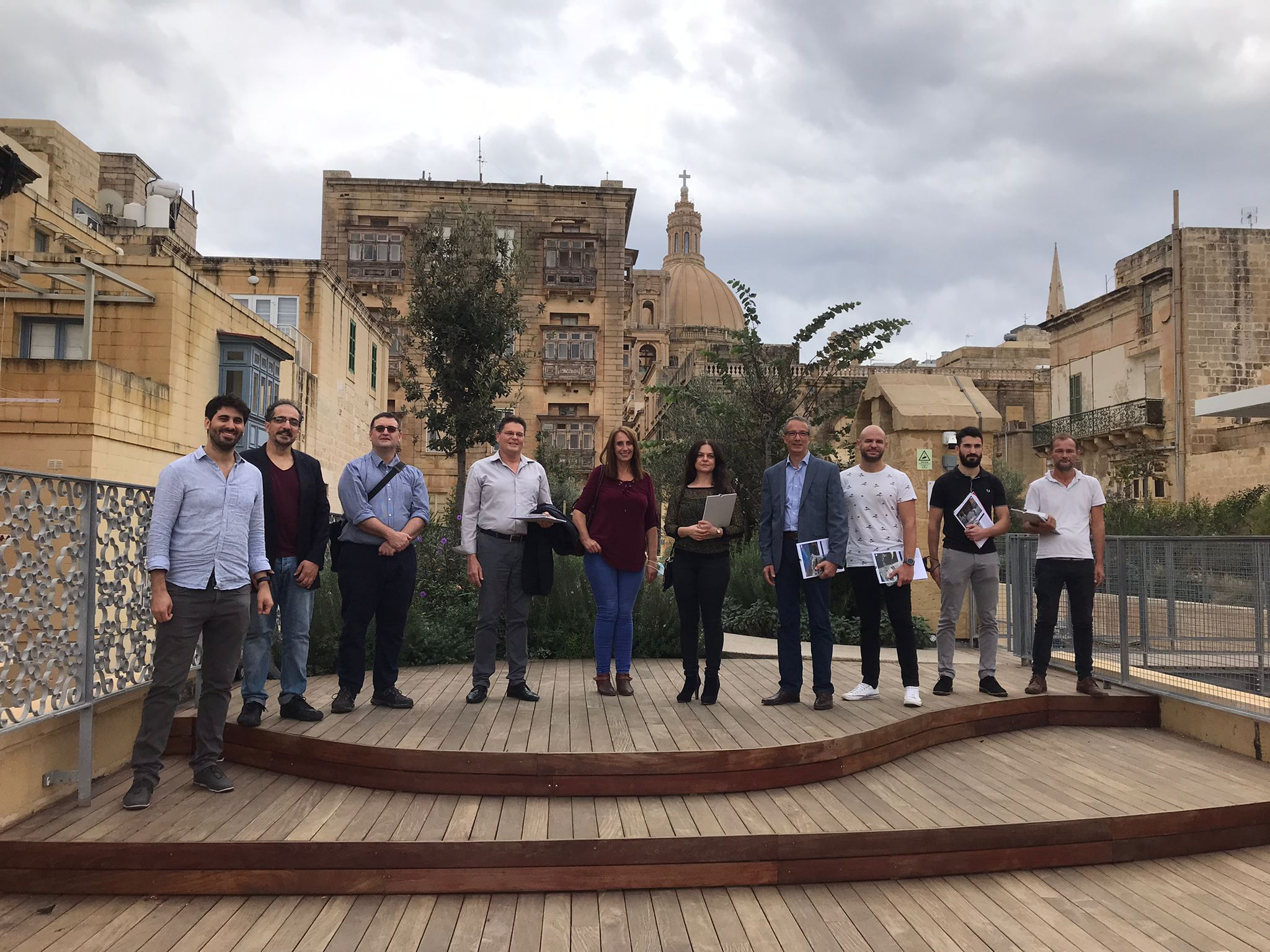
Wiki Loves Monuments Malta winners at the VDC roof garden, 2021

The building's roof is open to the general public as a roof garden. The green space includes indigenous trees and shrubs along with a pond, while the area also has seating, places for group gatherings, two multifunctional spaces and a meeting room. All floors of the VDC including the roof garden are accessible to all through a lift and stairs.
