= Malta Philharmonic Orchestra =

Maltese musical band

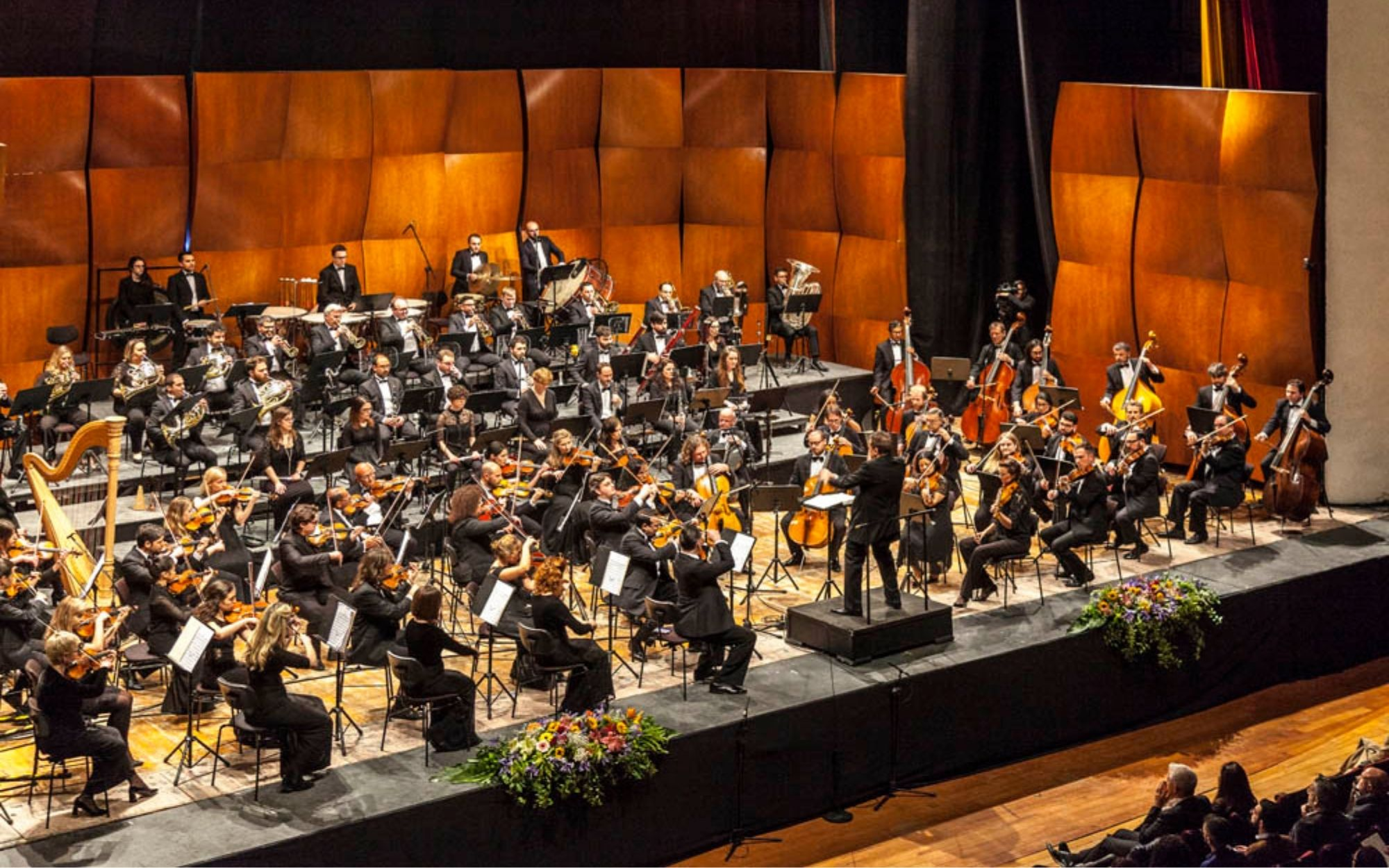
The Malta Philharmonic Orchestra (MPO) performing at the Mediterranean Conference Centre.

The Malta Philharmonic Orchestra is recognized as Malta’s foremost musical institution.

Founded in 1968 as the Manoel Theatre Orchestra, in September 1997 it became an independent body and was officially named as Malta's national orchestra. In 2008, it expanded into a full-size orchestra and became the MPO.

== History ==
The orchestra was founded in April 1968, when musicians from the defunct “Commander-in-Chief” (C-in-C) orchestra of the Malta-based British Mediterranean Fleet regrouped as the Manoel Theatre Orchestra. It continued to serve as the theatre’s resident orchestra until September 1997, when it became an independent orchestra, taking up the name National Orchestra of Malta. The orchestra became the MPO in 2008 when it expanded into a full-size symphony orchestra, bringing together the best of Maltese talent and musicians from Europe and beyond.

Joseph Sammut, the C-in-C’s last conductor, was the orchestra’s first conductor, remaining at the helm until 1992. Since then, the orchestra has also been under the direction of Joseph Vella, John Galea, Michael Laus, and Brian Schembri(Artistic Director and Principal Conductor). In 2019, the MPO has appointed Sergey Smbatyan as Principal Conductor, joining Resident Conductor Michael Laus as part of the orchestra’s Artistic Team. The MPO also works with local and international guest conductors and soloists including Lawrence Renes, Michalis Economou, Guy Braunstein, Alexei Volodin, Camilla Tilling, Joseph Calleja, and Enrico Dindo.

As Malta’s leading musical ensemble, the MPO averages more than one performance a week including symphonic concerts, opera productions in Malta and Gozo, community outreach and educational initiatives, as well as various concerts of a lighter nature.

The orchestra has performed in leading venues across the globe, including in the United States, Russia, Germany, Austria, China, Italy, and Belgium, and presently embarks on at least one international tour each concert season.

The MPO is a keen exponent of Maltese composers, regularly performing their works in Malta and overseas, as well as frequently premiering and commissioning new compositions.

Through the MPO Academy and the Malta Youth Orchestra, which regularly give concerts across Malta, the MPO is also responsible for the training and professional development of the next generation of Maltese musicians.
