= Johanna Beisteiner =

Austrian classical guitarist

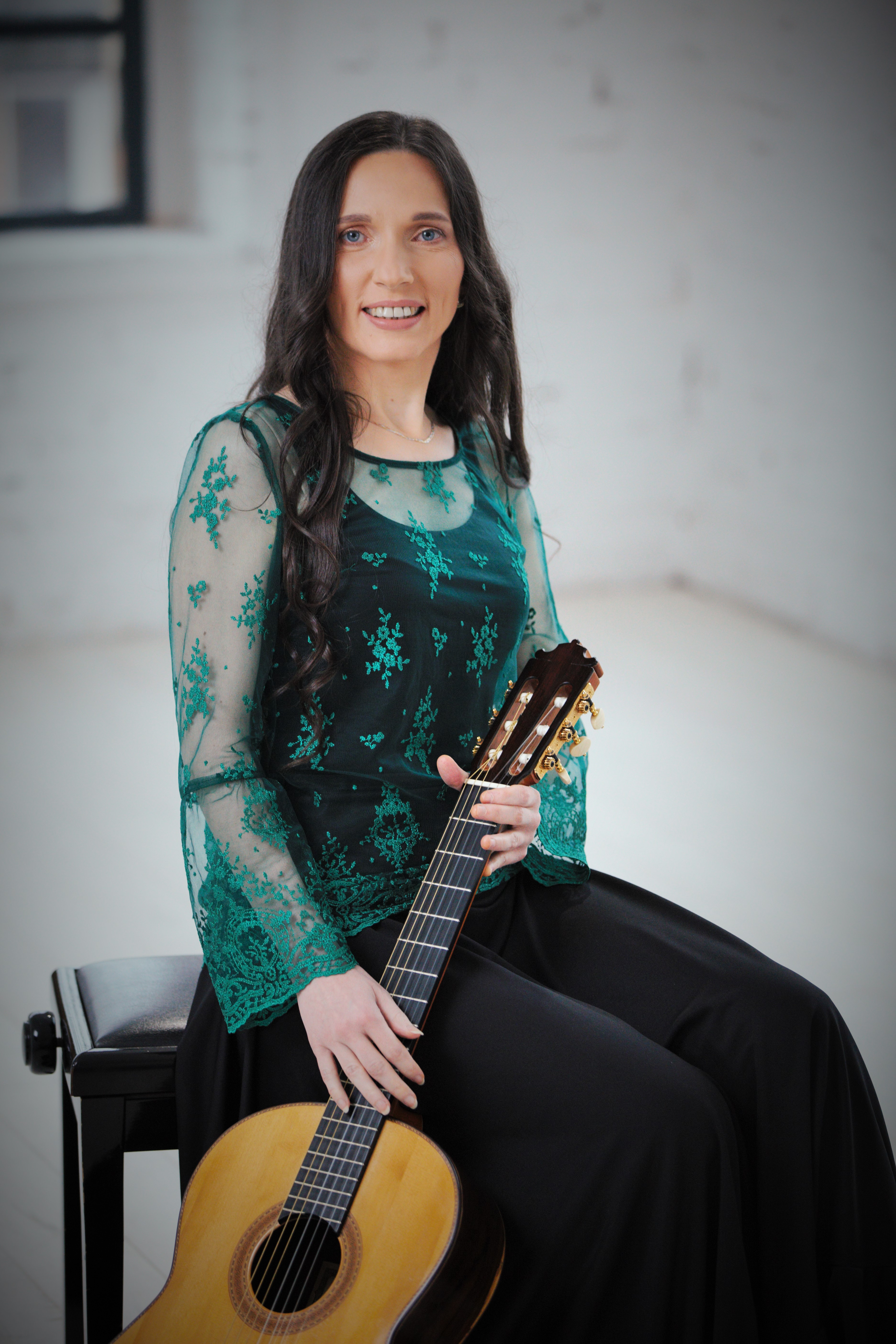
- Beisteiner in 2019

Background information
- Born: 20 February 1976 (age 50); Wiener Neustadt, Austria
- Genres: Classical music, Film music
- Occupations: Guitarist, Singer, Actress, Arranger
- Instrument: Guitar
- Years active: fl. ca. 1992 - present
- Label: Gramy Records
- Website: Official website

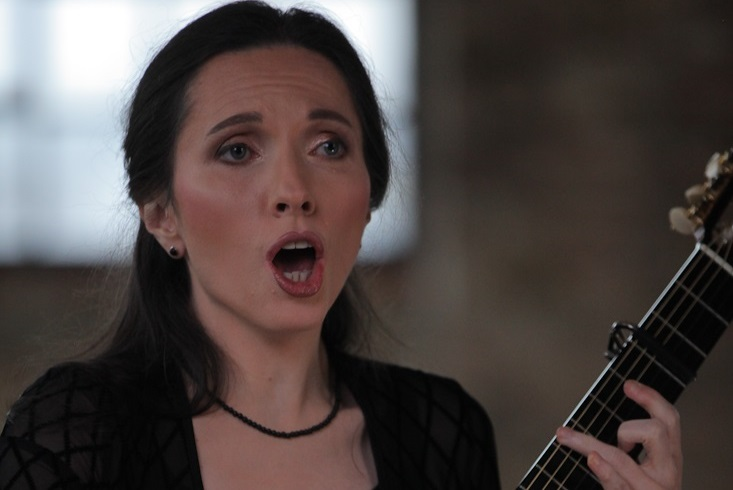
J. Beisteiner as a singer, accompanying herself on the guitar (2019)

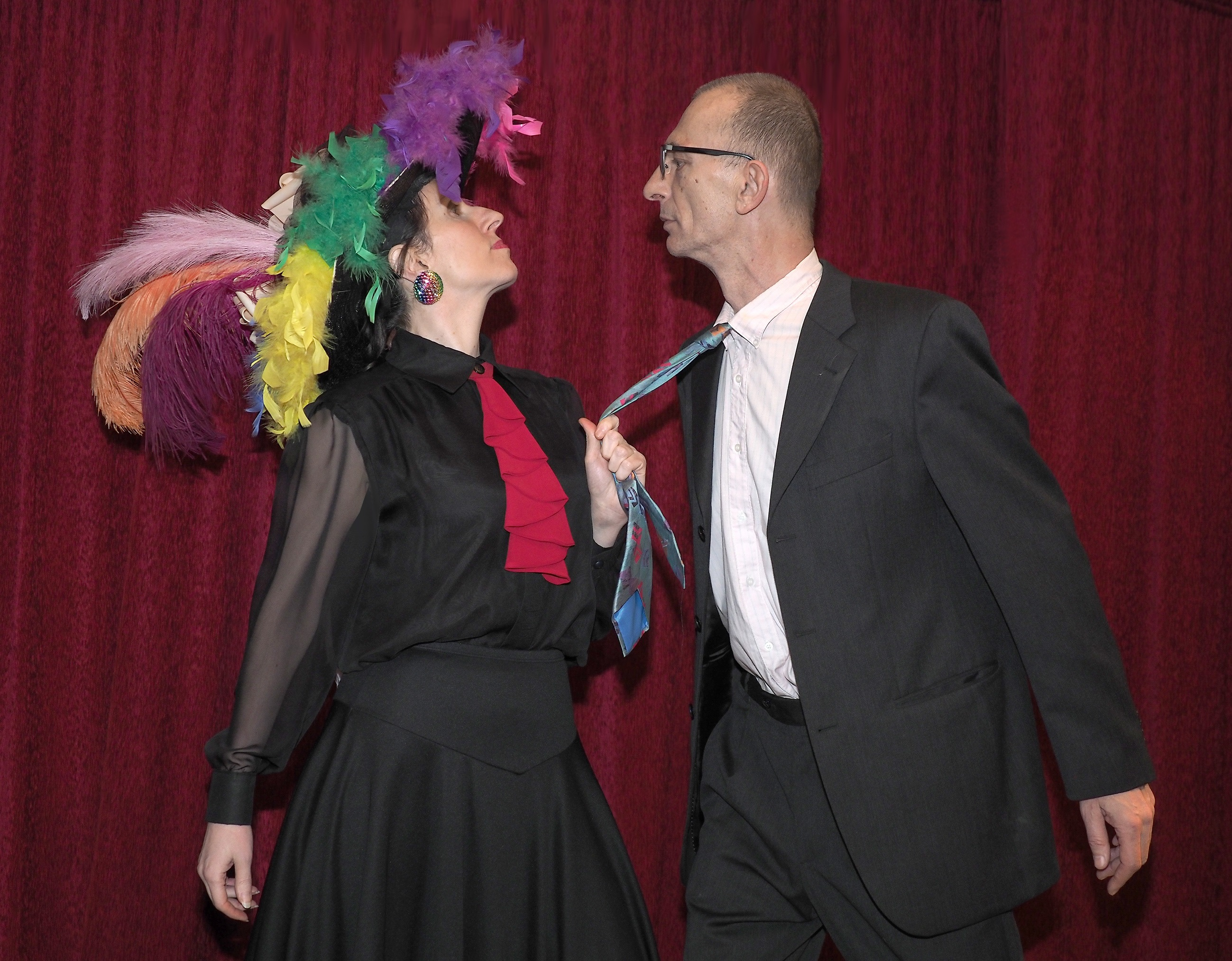
Johanna Beisteiner & Leo Pfisterer in the cabaret program Amorous and Scandalous, February 2025. Photo: M. Kalchhauser

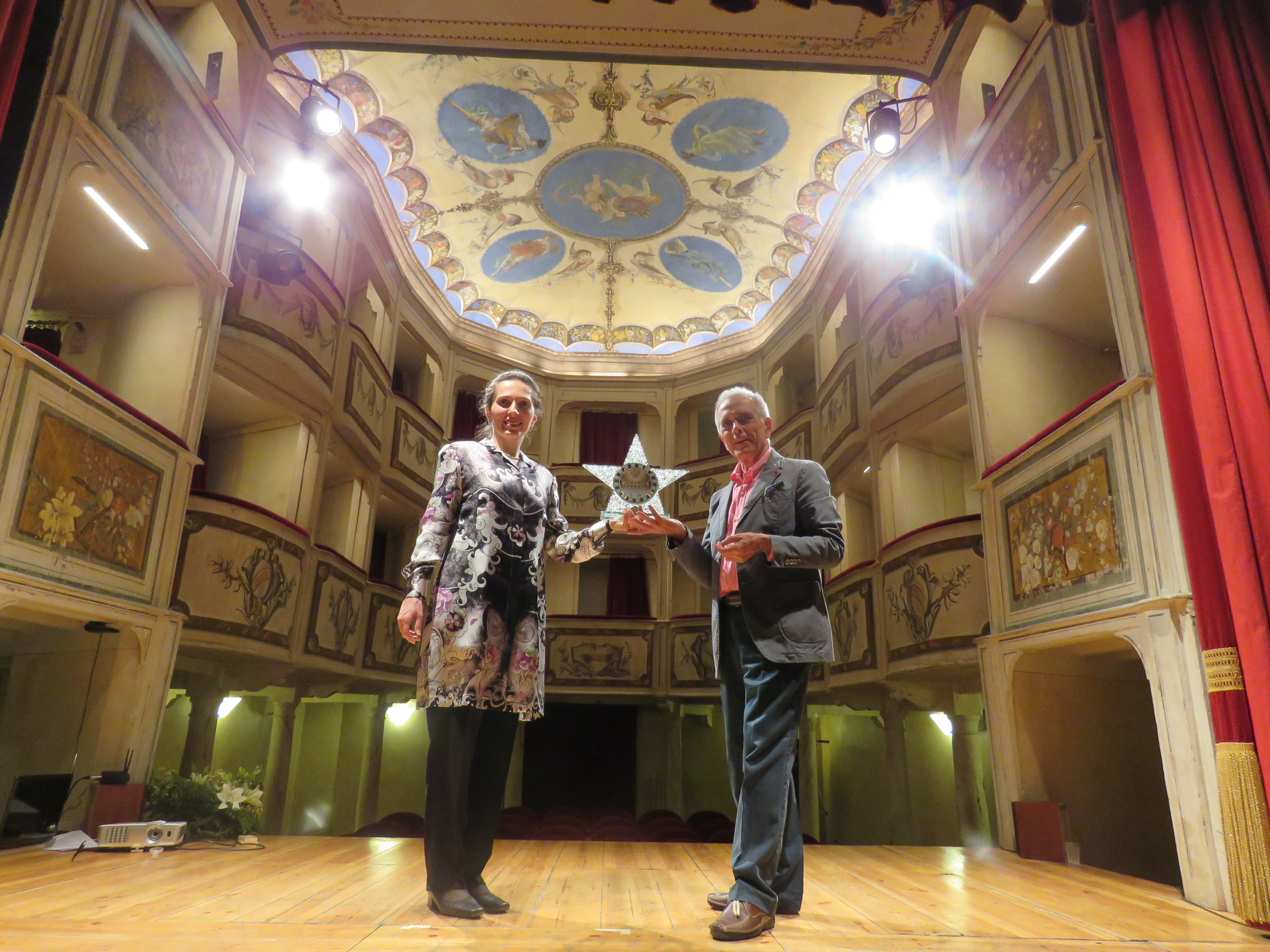
Johanna Beisteiner (left) receiving the Premio Teatro della Concordia 2016 from Edoardo Brenci (President of the Società del Teatro della Concordia, right).

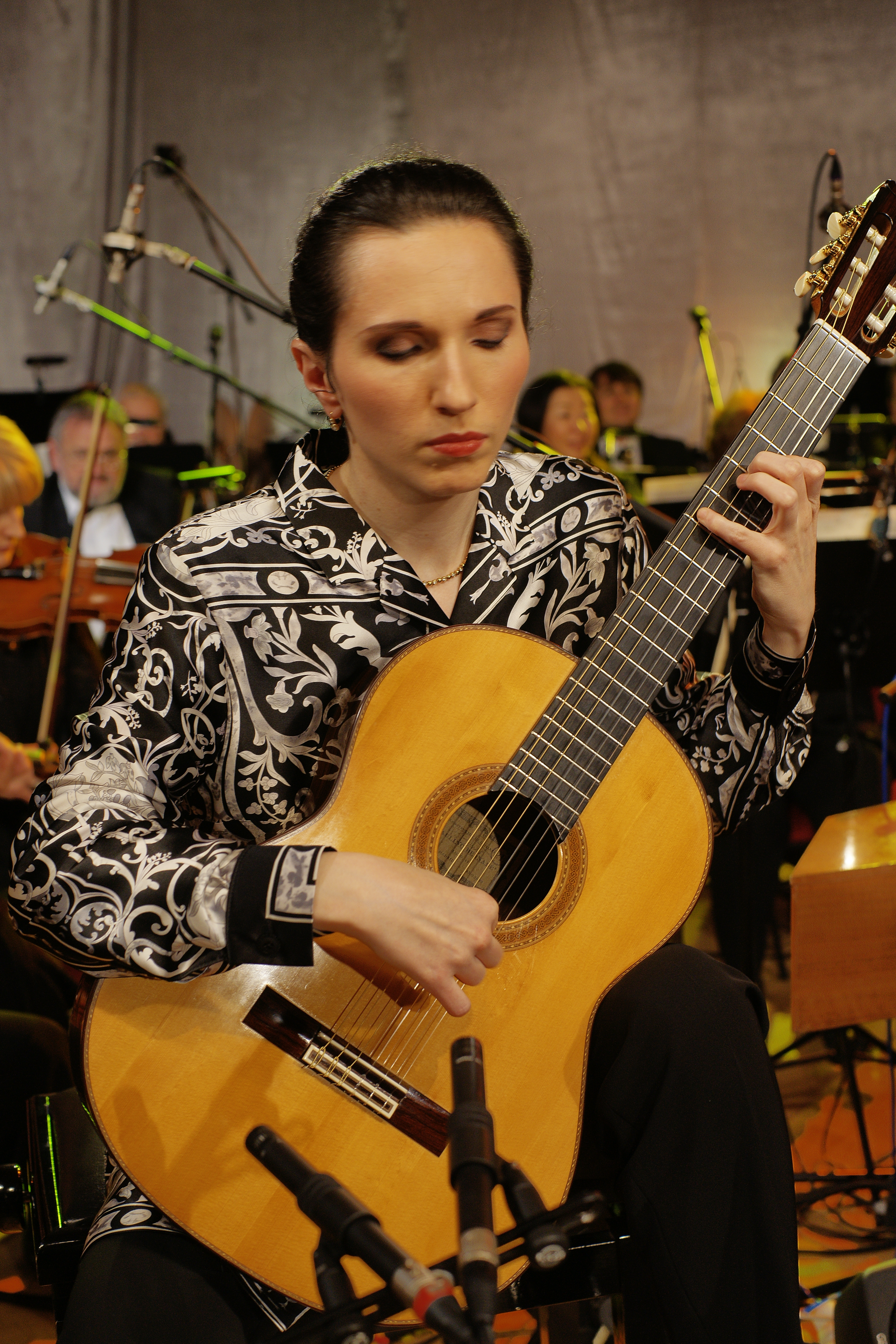
Johanna Beisteiner live with the Budapest Symphony Orchestra, 2009

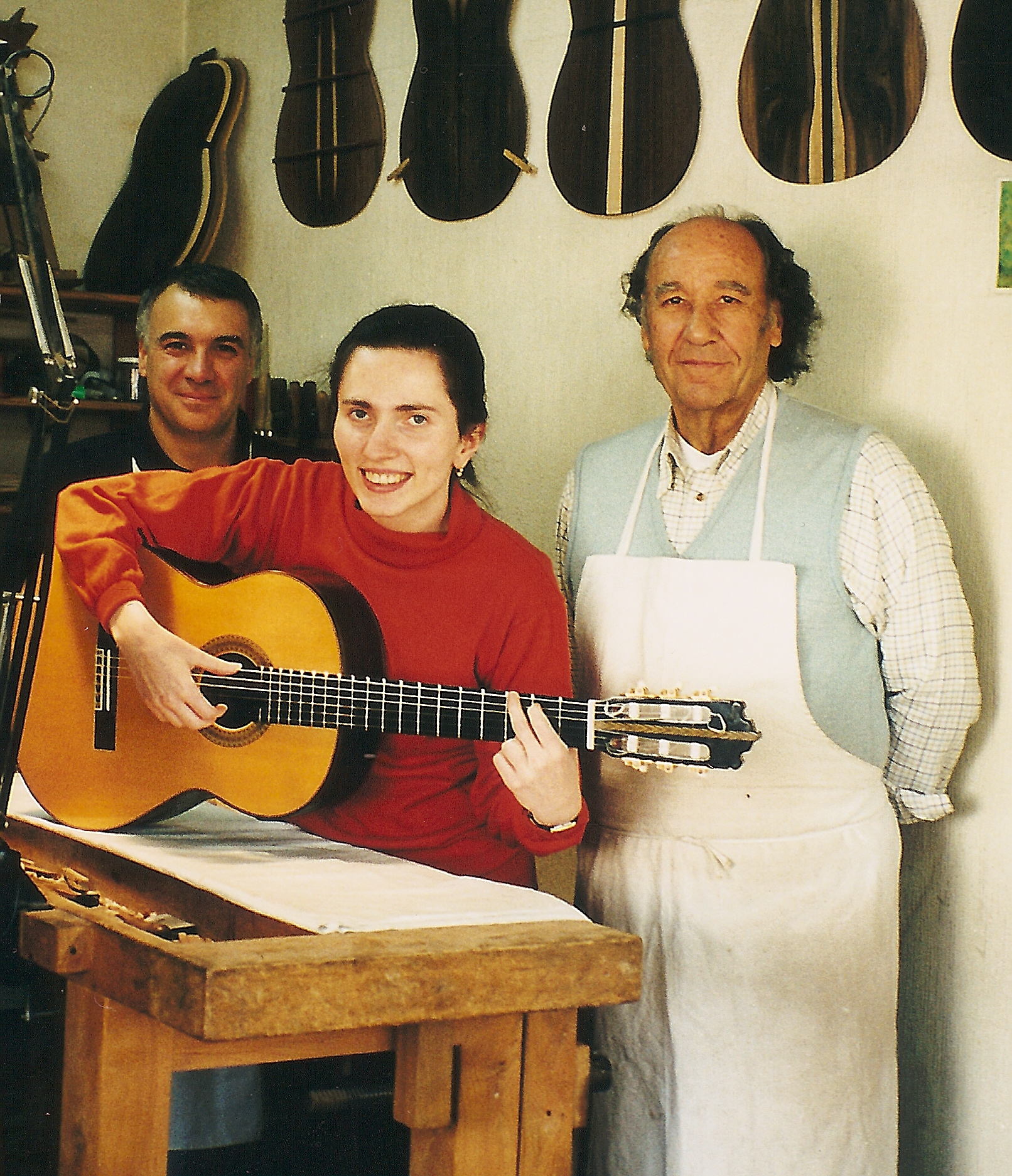
The Austrian classical guitarist Johanna Beisteiner (middle) in the workshop of Spanish luthiers Paulino Bernabe Senior (right) and Junior (left). Madrid (Spain), October 2000

Johanna Beisteiner (born 20 February 1976) is an Austrian classical guitarist, singer, actress and arranger.

== Life ==
Johanna Beisteiner received her first guitar lessons at the age of nine at the Josef Matthias Hauer music school in her hometown Wiener Neustadt. In 1992, when only sixteen years of age, she became a student at the University of Music and Performing Arts, Vienna, from where she graduated as a concert guitarist as well as a Doctor of philosophy with a PhD Thesis on Art music in figure skating, synchronized swimming and rhythmic gymnastics.

Johanna Beisteiner is an internationally active guitar soloist and singer, her repertoire contains music from the 15th to the 20th century as well as contemporary classical music. Inter alia she played several world premieres of works by the composers Robert Gulya, Reuben Pace and Eduard Shafransky. Moreover, she worked with known orchestras such as the Budapest Symphony Orchestra, Malta Philharmonic Orchestra, Sochi Symphony Orchestra, Graz Chamber Philharmonic and Budapest Strings Chamber Orchestra, renowned conductors such as Michelle Castelletti, Béla Drahos, Achim Holub and Oleg Soldatov and the Argentine Tango dancer as well as choreographer Rafael Ramirez. In addition to her numerous recordings for Gramy Records, she also appeared in television and radio productions for RAI 3 (Italy), Channel 4 (Russia) and Bartok Radio (Hungary) and recorded soundtracks for movies. In 2012 she composed her first own piece Zemlinsky's Night on themes by Alexander von Zemlinsky.

In 2017 Beisteiner was invited by the Valletta International Baroque Festival to give concerts at Manoel Theatre as well as National Library of Malta with works by Reuben Pace and Johann Sebastian Bach. In 2018 she was selected by Reuben Pace as the interpreter for the world premiere of his Mdina Suite for guitar solo at the Wiener Musikverein. In the season 2018/19 she played her own arrangements of Renaissance works in a program on Pieter Bruegel the Elder at the Kunsthistorisches Museum in Vienna and sang in a duet with the actress and singer Katrin Stuflesser.

As part of her solo concerts in recent times, Johanna Beisteiner interprets also art songs (e. g. by Schubert or Mozart) and accompanies herself with specially developed playing techniques.

In October 2022 she went on tour in the USA with performances in New York City, Washington DC and Durham (North Carolina). During this concert tour, she presented her one-woman show Farkas in America ― a combination of recitation, music and flamenco dance ― at the Austrian Cultural Forum New York and at the PSI Theatre of Durham Arts Council. This one-woman show was based on the book of poems Farkas entdeckt Amerika (en: Farkas discovers America) by the Jewish-Austrian comedian Karl Farkas , who ironically described in this work his escape from the Nazi regime via France and Spain to the USA and his life there from 1938-42. Beisteiner also gave a solo concert at the Church of the Epiphany (Washington, D.C.) with songs by Schubert and Mozart and works for solo guitar by Pace and Albéniz.

As part of a cycle by the Maison Heinrich Heine in Paris in honor of Ingeborg Bachmann, Beisteiner opened the series of events with the musical-literary soloprogram Ingeborg Bachmann & Paul Celan on the 50th anniversary of Bachmann's death on October 17, 2023. In November 2023, she toured Canada and the United States with performances at the Centrepointe Theatre in Ottawa, Ottawa Public Library as well as PSI Theatre in Durham. The artist presented her one-woman show Austrian Rarities with works by Beethoven, Mozart and Schubert as well as anecdotes from Ingeborg Bachmann's connections to North America. She also moderated the Book Club of the European Union on the English translation of a book by Ludwig Drahosch, Simonetta's Shadow: A Tale about the Unteachability of the Beautiful (Edition Margarete Tischler, 2022).

Since 2024 she has been performing as an actress and musician in the scenic cabaret program Amorous and Scandalous based on historical criminal cases and created by Leo Pfisterer.

Beisteiner plays on classical Spanish guitars made by Paulino Bernabe Senior and Junior.

== Honours and awards ==
- 2008: Crystal trophy 200 Years Teatro della Concordia (Monte Castello di Vibio, Italy)
- 2011: Honorary Membership in the Association Hohenschönhausen Castle (Berlin, Germany)
- 2016: Premio Teatro della Concordia 2016 for Beisteiner's own composition Don Quixote Fantasy on themes from a ballet by Minkus

== World premieres ==
=== Works by Robert Gulya ===
- 2000: Fairy Dance for guitar solo
- 2006: Capriccio for guitar and piano
- 2007: Night Sky Preludes for guitar solo
- 2009: Concert for guitar and orchestra. Sample of first movement performed live in 2009 by Johanna Beisteiner and the Budapest Symphony Orchestra conducted by Béla Drahos (Video published in 2010 by Gramy Records).
- 2009: The Milonguero and the Muse (Tango), second version for flute, guitar and string orchestra. Sample of this tango performed live in 2009 by Béla Drahos, Johanna Beisteiner and the Budapest Symphony Orchestra (Video published in 2010 by Gramy Records)
- 2010: Waltz for guitar solo
- 2013: Nutcracker Variations for guitar and string orchestra

=== Works by Reuben Pace ===
- 2017: Concertino for guitar, harpsichord and orchestra

=== Works by Eduard Shafransky ===
- 2004: Requiem for guitar
- 2007: Caravaggio oggi or Reflections on a painting by Caravaggio. Sample (Video published in 2010 by Gramy Records)
- 2007: Night in Granada
- 2009: Old quarters of Alanya
- 2009: Songs of breakers

== Discography ==
=== CD ===
- 2001: Dance Fantasy
- 2002: Salon
- 2004: Between present and past
- 2007: Virtuosi italiani della chitarra romantica
- 2012: Austrian Rhapsody
- 2016: Don Quijote

=== DVD ===
- 2010: Live in Budapest

=== Soundtracks ===
- 2005: Truce
- 2007: S.O.S Love!

== Bibliography ==
- Art music in figure skating, synchronized swimming and rhythmic gymnastics / Kunstmusik in Eiskunstlauf, Synchronschwimmen und rhythmischer Gymnastik. PhD thesis by Johanna Beisteiner, Vienna 2005, (German). The PhD thesis contains, inter alia, an analysis of the film Carmen on Ice (Chapter II/2, pages 105-162) as well as extensive descriptions of several competitive and show programs to Carmen and Swan lake. Article about the PhD thesis of Johanna Beisteiner in the catalogue of the Austrian Library Network. 2005. (German and English)

== See also ==
- List of Austrians in music
