= Budapest Symphony Orchestra =

Hungarian radio orchestra

Hungarian Radio Symphony Orchestra
- Radio orchestra
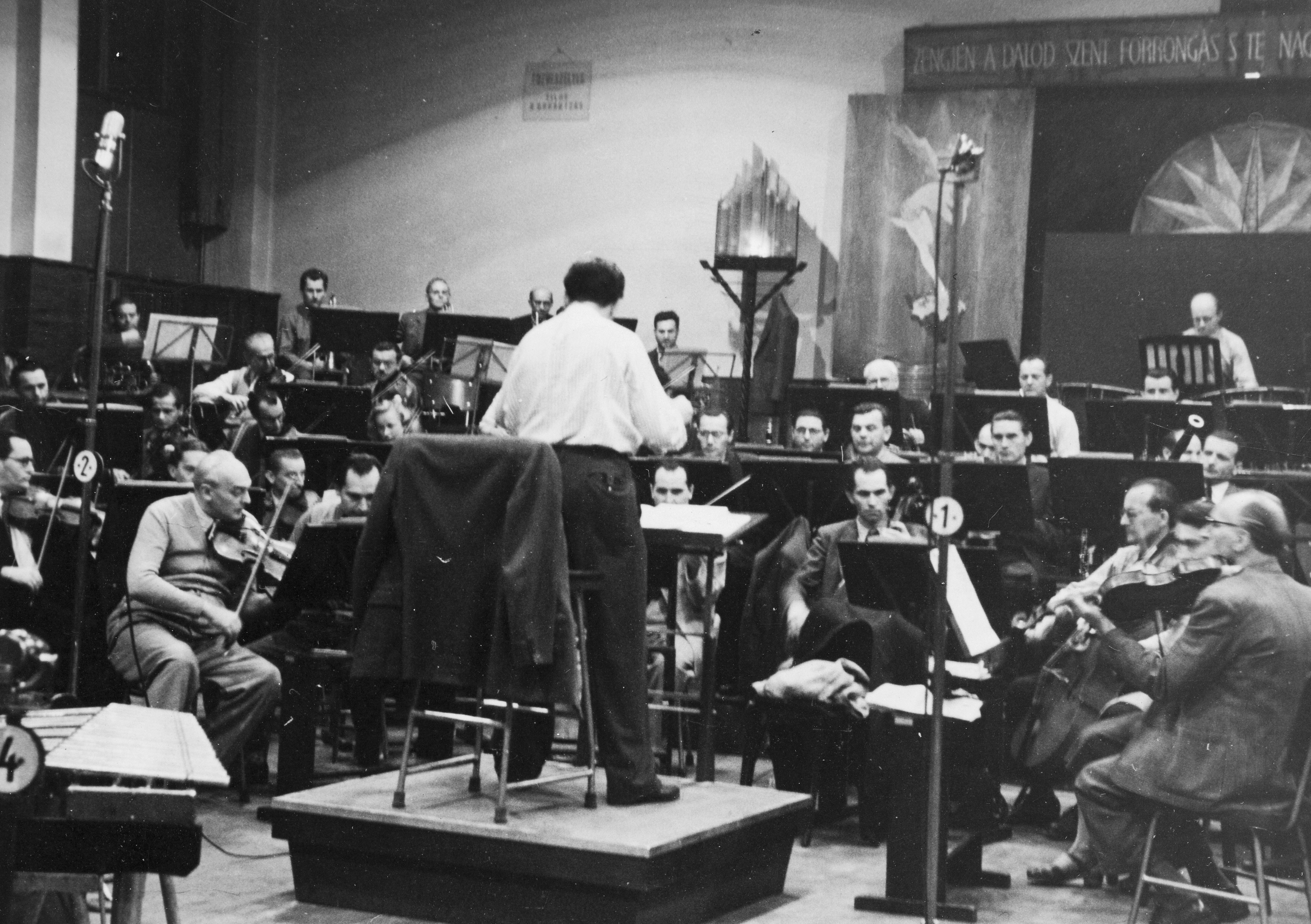
- Hungarian Radio Symphony Orchestra in the Hungarian Radio Studio in 1959.
- Founded: 1943; 83 years ago
- Location: Budapest, Hungary
- Concert hall: Liszt Ferenc Academy of Music; Müpa Budapest
- Website: mrze.hu

The Hungarian Radio Symphony Orchestra (Hungarian: Magyar Rádió Szimfonikus Zenekara; MRZE) is a Hungarian radio orchestra. It is part of the Hungarian Television and Broadcasting Organisation, Magyar Rádió. It was known earlier as Budapest Symphony Orchestra.

== History ==
The Hungarian Radio Symphony Orchestra was founded in 1943 by conductor Ernst von Dohnányi, then known as the Budapest Symphony Orchestra. A salon orchestra had been established by the Hungarian Radio in 1936, led by István Bertha and Miklós Fehér, with Tibor Ney as the concert master. Some members of this orchestra became founding members of the symphony orchestra.

The orchestra has performed internationally with distinguished conductors and soloists such as János Ferencsik, Otto Klemperer, Carlo Zecchi, Leopold Stokowski, John Barbirolli, Claudio Abbado, Charles Münch, Georg Solti, Gennady Rozhdestvensky, Neville Marriner, Béla Drahos, Johanna Beisteiner, Giuseppe Patane, Igor Markevitch, Robert Gulya and Ilaiyaraaja.

Through its frequent broadcasts and its recordings it has become widely known, and its tours have taken it to the countries of Eastern and Western Europe as well as to the United States of America and Canada. It enjoys a reputation for its interpretations of the Hungarian symphonic literature, especially works by living composers.

The recordings of the orchestra are published, inter alia, by Naxos, Gramy and Hungaroton. (They performed the music for the 2011 Turkish film God's Faithful Servant: Barla.)

== Principal conductors ==
- Ernst von Dohnányi (1943–1945)
- János Ferencsik (1945)
- Tibor Polgár (1945)
- László Somogyi (1951)
- György Lehel (1956)
- András Ligeti (1989)
- Tamás Vásáry (1993)
- László Kovács (2004–2008)
- Ádám Fischer
- Stephen D’Agostino (2009–2011)
- Vajda Gergely (2011–2014)
- Kovács János

== Discography (selected) ==
- J. S. Bach: V. D-dúr Brandenburgi verseny (BWV 1050) (vez. Otto Klemperer, Annie Fischer, Tibor Ney, Szebenyi János) Hungaroton – LPX 12160
- Balassa Sándor: Karl és Anna – opera (vez. Sallay Imre; Hungaroton Classic HCD 32162–64)
- Balassa Sándor: 301-es parcella (vez. Howard Williams; Hungaroton Classic HCD 32161)
- Bartók: Cantata profana (vez. Doráti Antal; Hungaroton Classic HCD 31503)
- Beethoven: Szimfóniák (összkiadás) (vez. Vásáry Tamás; Hungaroton Classic HCD 31717–22, élő felvétel)
- Bozay Attila: Pezzo concertato no. 2 (vez. Lehel György; Hungaroton Classic HCD 31936)
- Brahms: Szimfóniák (összkiadás), hegedű- és zongoraversenyek, nyitányok, Német requiem (vez. Vásáry Tamás; Hungaroton Classic HCD 32137–142)
- Brahms: Szimfóniák, nyitányok (vez. K. A. Rickenbacher; Discover)
- Csajkovszkij: V. szimfónia, 1812 nyitány, A vajda (vez. Vásáry Tamás; Hungaroton Classic HCD 32171)
- Csemiczky Miklós: Fantasia concertante, (vez. Gál Tamás; Hungaroton Classic HCD 31669)
- Dohnányi: Szimfonikus percek, fisz-moll szvit (vez. Vásáry Tamás; Hungaroton Classic HCD 31637)
- Dohnányi: I. és II. zongoraverseny (vez. Győriványi Ráth György; Hungaroton Classic HCD 31555)
- Dohnányi: I. és II. hegedűverseny (vez. Vásáry Tamás; Hungaroton Classic HCD 31759)
- Dohnányi: Simona néni – vígopera (vez. Kovács János; Hungaroton Classic HCD 31973)
- Donizetti: Anna Bolena – opera (vez. Elio Boncompagni; Nightingale Classics NC070565-2)
- Dubrovay László: Cimbalomverseny (vez. Gál Tamás; Hungaroton Classic HCD 31669)
- Dubrovay László: Faust, az elkárhozott – négy balettszvit, II. zongoraverseny (vez. Kovács László, Antal Mátyás; Hungaroton Classic HCD 31831)
- Dubrovay László: Magyar szimfónia, Sasok éneke (vez. Hamar Zsolt, Kovács László; Hungaroton Classic HCD 32065)
- Durkó Zsolt: Halotti beszéd – oratórium, Altamira (vez. Lehel György; Hungaroton Classic HCD 31654)
- Durkó Zsolt: A Jelenések könyvének margójára – oratórium (vez. Ligeti András; Hungaroton Classic HCD 31818)
- Durkó Zsolt: Magyar rapszódia, Hegedűverseny, Széchenyi-oratórium (vez. Lehel György, Vásáry Tamás; Hungaroton Classic HCD 32027)
- Farkas Ferenc: Furfangos diákok – szvit, Concertino all’antica, Concertino IV (vez. Lehel György, Farkas András; Hungaroton Classic HCD 31851)
- Farkas Ferenc: Cantus Pannonicus, Vivit Dominus, Tavaszvárás – kantáta (vez. Forrai Miklós, Farkas András, Ferencsik János; Hungaroton Classic HCD 31852)
- Farkas Ferenc: Omaggio a Pessoa, Rákóczi-kantáta (vez. Ligeti Adrás, Medveczky Ádám; Hungaroton Classic HCD 31978)
- Huzella Elek: Concertino lirico (vez. Kórodi András; Hungaroton Classic HCD 31990)
- Jeney Zoltán: Alef (vez. Eötvös Péter; Hungaroton Classic HCD 31653)
- Jeney Zoltán: Sostenuto (vez. Serei Zsolt; Hungaroton Classic HCD 32050)
- Király László: Egy szerelem korszakai, Akácok városa (vez. Kovács János, Kovács László; Hungaroton Classic HCD 31954)
- Kókai Rezső: Hegedűverseny (vez. Lehel György; Hungaroton Classic HCD 31990)
- Korngold: Heliane csodája – részlet (Marton Éva, vez. John Carewe; Hungaroton Classic HCD 31002)
- Kósa György: Bikasirató (vez. Lehel György; Hungaroton Classic HCD 31982)
- Lendvay Kamilló: Concertino semplice (vez. Ligeti András; Hungaroton Classic HCD 31669)
- Lendvay Kamilló: Szaxofonverseny, II. hegedűverseny, Gordonkaverseny, Concertino (vez. Hamar Zsolt, Győriványi-Ráth György, Sándor János; Hungaroton Classic HCD 31787)
- Lendvay Kamilló: Négy zenekari invokáció, Jelenetek (vez. Lehel György; Hungaroton Classic HCD 32064)
- Madarász Iván: Flautiáda (vez. Drahos Béla; Hungaroton Classic HCD 31830)
- Maros Rudolf: Eufonia 1, 2, 3, Gemma (vez. Lehel György; Hungaroton Classic HCD 31699)
- Maros Rudolf: Öt zenekari tanulmány, Jegyzetek, Töredék (vez. Lehel György; Hungaroton Classic HCD 31984)
- Poldini Ede: Farsangi lakodalom – vígopera (vez. Breitner Tamás; Hungaroton Classic HCD 31974–75)
- Ránki György: Cimbalomverseny (vez. Gál Tamás; Hungaroton Classic HCD 31669)
- Ránki György: Pomádé király új ruhája – I. és II. szvit, 1514 – fantázia zongorára és zenekarra (vez. Pál Tamás, Sándor János, Erdélyi Miklós; Hungaroton Classic HCD 31957)
- Reményi Attila: A világ hajnalán, A világ alkonyán (vez. Ligeti András; Hungaroton Classic HCD 31669)
- Sári József: Concertino (vez. Kovács János; Hungaroton Classic HCD 31715)
- Schönberg: Várakozás (Marton Éva, vez. John Carewe; Hungaroton Classic HCD 31748)
- Schönberg: Hat dal (Marton Éva, vez. John Carewe; Hungaroton Classic HCD 31002)
- Schreker: Az örök életről (Marton Éva, vez. John Carewe; Hungaroton Classic HCD 31002)
- Schubert: Szimfóniák (összkiadás) (vez. Vásáry Tamás; Hungaroton Classic HCD 32110–13)
- Schumann: Szimfóniák (összkiadás) (vez. Vásáry Tamás; Hungaroton Classic HCD 32123–24)
- Soproni József: Eklypsis, I. és II. gordonkaverseny, Ovidius átváltozásai (vez. Lehel György, Ligeti András, Erdélyi Miklós; Hungaroton Classic HCD 32024)
- Sugár Rezső: Savonarola – oratórium (vez. Kórodi András; Hungaroton Classic HCD 12518)
- Sugár Rezső: Concerto in memoriam Bartók Béla, Sinfonia a variazione, Epilogue (vez. Ligeti András; Hungaroton Classic HCD 31189)
- Szervánszky Endre: Hat zenekari darab (vez. Németh Gyula; Hungaroton Classic HCD 31728)
- Szervánszky Endre: Variációk, Fuvolaverseny, Klarinétverseny (vez. Medveczky Ádám; Hungaroton Classic HCD 31987)
- Tihanyi László: Krios, Enodios (vez. a szerző; Hungaroton Classic HCD 31352)
- Vántus István: Harangszó, Aranykoporsó – részletek (vez. Ligeti András, Pál Tamás; Hungaroton Classic HCD 31748)
- Vécsei Jenő: Zongora-concertino (vez. Lehel György; Hungaroton Classic HCD 31990)
- Viski János: Hegedűverseny, Zongoraverseny (vez. Lukács Miklós, Bródy Tamás; Hungaroton Classic HCD 31988)
- Wagner: Wesendonck-dalok, Trisztán és Izolda – Előjáték és Izolda szerelmi halála (Marton Éva, vez. Kovács János; Hungaroton Classic HCD 31748)
- Weiner Leó: Pasztorál, fantázia és fúga (vez. Kórodi András; Hungaroton Classic HCD 31992)
- Zemlinsky: Hat dal, op. 13. (Marton Éva, vez. John Carewe; Hungaroton Classic HCD 31002)

== Gallery ==
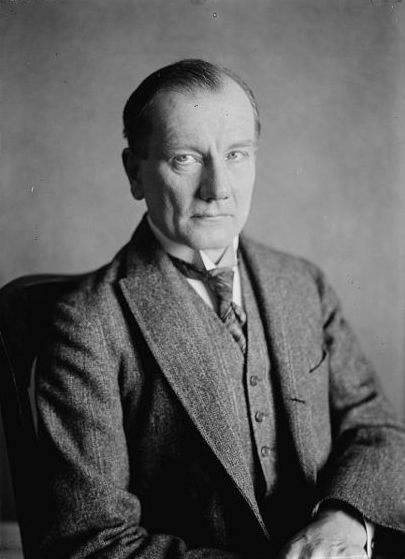
Ernst von Dohnányi, founder of the orchestra

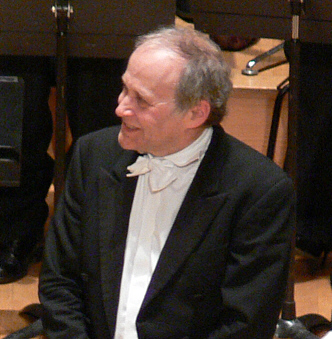
Ádám Fischer, general music director of the orchestra in 2004
