= Opera (1987 film) =

Film by Dario Argento

- Theatrical release poster by Renato Casaro
- Directed by: Dario Argento
- Screenplay by: Dario Argento; Franco Ferrini
- Story by: Dario Argento
- Produced by: Dario Argento
- Starring: Cristina Marsillach; Ian Charleson; Urbano Barberini; William McNamara; Antonella Vitale; Barbara Cupisti; Coralina Cataldi-Tassoni; Daria Nicolodi
- Cinematography: Ronnie Taylor
- Edited by: Franco Fraticelli
- Production companies: A.D.C. Produzioni Cinematografiche e Televisive; Cecchi Gori Group - Tiger Cinematografica; RAI-Radiotelevisione Italiana (Rete 2)
- Distributed by: CDI Compagnia Distribuzione Internazionale
- Release date: 19 December 1987
- Running time: 107 minutes
- Country: Italy
- Budget: $8 million
- Box office: 4.737 billion lire (Italy)

Opera (also released as Terror at the Opera) is a 1987 Italian giallo film co-written, produced, and directed by Dario Argento. It stars Cristina Marsillach, Urbano Barberini, Daria Nicolodi, and Ian Charleson. The film's plot focuses on a young soprano (Marsillach) who becomes involved in a series of murders being committed inside an opera house by a masked assailant. The film features music composed and performed by Brian Eno, Claudio Simonetti, and Bill Wyman, and extensive excerpts from Giuseppe Verdi's Macbeth.

Released in Italy in December 1987, Opera was a commercial success, grossing 4.737 billion lire. The film failed to receive theatrical release in most other countries, though it did receive minor regional theatrical engagements in the United States in 1990, after Orion Pictures dropped the film from a planned American distribution.

== Plot ==
Prima donna Mara Cecova storms out of a dress rehearsal for Verdi's Macbeth at the Parma Opera House, aggravated by the live ravens and by director Marco, known for his horror movies. Cecova is injured by a passing car, and the role of Lady Macbeth is given to her apprehensive understudy Betty, whose deceased mother was also an opera singer. After reassurances from her agent Mira, Marco, and her stage manager boyfriend Stefano, Betty's performance is successful. Meanwhile, a stagehand discovers an intruder watching the opera from a balcony box reserved for personnel and is murdered by being impaled on a coat hook.

Betty receives a poison pen letter from the resentful Cecova. That night, a masked figure breaks into the opera house and slashes Betty's costume to sew a gold bracelet into it. The figure is attacked by the ravens and kills three of them. Betty spends the night with Stefano at his wealthy uncle's unoccupied residence. Stefano is sympathetic about Betty's sexual dysfunction. When he goes to make tea, the masked figure suddenly gags Betty, binds her, tapes needles under her eyes, and forces her to watch as Stefano is stabbed to death. The killer gropes Betty, claiming that she is aroused, then loosens her bonds and flees. Betty reports the murder to the police from a nearby payphone. Marco drives her home, where she describes the ordeal and says that the masked killer resembled a figure in her childhood nightmares.

Inspector Alan Santini questions the opera staff about Stefano's murder and the raven attack. Betty later meets with seamstress Giulia to mend her costume. The killer reappears and constrains Betty in the same manner as before, then stabs Giulia, who swallows the bracelet. The killer cuts her throat open to retrieve it before loosening Betty's bonds and fleeing again.

Santini promises to send Betty his assistant Daniele Soave to her apartment building for her protection. Betty admits a man that she presumes is Soave, but Mira arrives and says she spoke to a different man claiming to be Soave in the lobby. Betty and Mira hide while the man takes a phone call and exits the apartment. Not long afterward, someone claiming to be Soave requests entry. Mira is fatally shot in the head while trying to verify the figure's identity through the peephole. Betty hides as the killer breaks into the apartment. She encounters the real, mortally wounded Soave, who reentered the apartment and was stabbed by the killer, and escapes through the ventilation system with the help of a neighbor girl.

Betty meets with Marco, who has a secret plan to identify the killer during a performance. Betty has a recurring nightmare in which she discovers her mother bound in a dilapidated room, with her face reflected in a mirror while a woman screams then falls silent, after which Betty glimpses the masked figure. During the following night's performance, Marco unleashes the ravens into the audience. Recognizing their attacker, Santini, the birds gouge out one of his eyes. Santini shoots at Betty and flees, then later abducts her from her dressing room.

Santini reveals that he was enamored of Betty's mother, who had him torture and murder young women for her gratification. Young Betty partially witnessed one such murder, which haunted her nightmares. Santini eventually killed Betty's mother due to her escalating demands and refusal to have sex with him. Betty's resemblance to her mother has now revived Santini's bloodlust. Santini blindfolds Betty, binds her to a chair, and stages his suicide by setting the room on fire. Betty breaks free and escapes.

Betty and Marco withdraw to Marco's house in the Swiss Alps to plan a staging of La Traviata. Marco sees a news broadcast indicating that a mannequin, not Santini, was burned in the fire, and that a manhunt is underway for Santini. He discovers that his housekeeper has been murdered and shouts for Betty to flee. Betty runs from the house, pursued by Santini. Marco tackles him, only to be stabbed to death. Betty bashes Santini on the head with a rock, and the police arrest him as Betty declares that she is nothing like her mother. Betty finds a lizard trapped in foliage and sets it free.

== Cast ==
- Cristina Marsillach as Betty
  - Elizabeth Norberg-Schulz as Betty's singing voice (uncredited)
- Ian Charleson as Marco
- Urbano Barberini as Inspector Alan Santini
- Daria Nicolodi as Mira
- Coralina Cataldi-Tassoni as Giulia
- Antonella Vitale as Marion
- William McNamara as Stefano Brini
- Barbara Cupisti as Signora Albertini
- Francesca Cassola as Alma
- Carola Stagnaro as Alma's Mother
- Maurizio Garrone as Maurizio
- Cristina Giachino as Maria
- György G. Ráth as Miro, the conductor
- Michele Soavi as Inspector Daniele Soave (uncredited)

== Themes ==
Critic Patrick Taggart, writing for the Austin American-Statesman in 1990, interpreted the film as a metaphor for "the death of classical arts by a society consumed by pop culture and cheap, ephemeral pleasures." Taggart cited that the use of heavy metal music in the film's violent murder sequences contrasted against the "grand and sweeping" scenes of operatic performance.

== Production ==
In early 1985, director Dario Argento was entrusted by Sferisterio di Macerata with a production of Giuseppe Verdi's Rigoletto, which was to be Argento's debut as an opera director. Argento's version would have included horrific overtones and gimmicks, such as devices in seats throughout the theatre that would release voltage during thunderstorm scenes. The theatre did not approve of Argento's ideas, leading him to eventually back out of the project. Further problems for Argento occurred when he and Daria Nicolodi were arrested for drug possession, after police had found hashish in their home. According to Michele Soavi, Argento spent two years working on the script for Opera, noting that early drafts "went beyond the limitations of gore which any country, apart from Japan, would have found unacceptable" and that early drafts of the film were "far too long and rather incomplete in certain areas." During pre-production, Argento learned of his father's death on April 19, 1987, after he had been suffering from a long illness.

Development of Opera was announced in mid-1986. Argento declared that the film would initially be shot at Teatro Carignano and star Giuliana De Sio, who was at the peak of her popularity in Italy following the release of Let's Hope It's a Girl. Neither plans materialized, with the film being shot at Teatro Regio in Parma and the lead being cast by the Spanish actress Cristina Marsillach. Argento had initially wanted Jennifer Connelly to play the role of Betty in the film, but changed his mind as he did not want comparisons between this film and Phenomena (1985). He then attempted to cast Mia Sara, the star of Legend (1985), but changed his mind when fashion designer Giorgio Armani suggested Marsillach. Much of the cast had previously worked with Argento, such as Barberini and Zinny appearing in Argento's productions of Demons, and Tassoni starring in Demons 2.

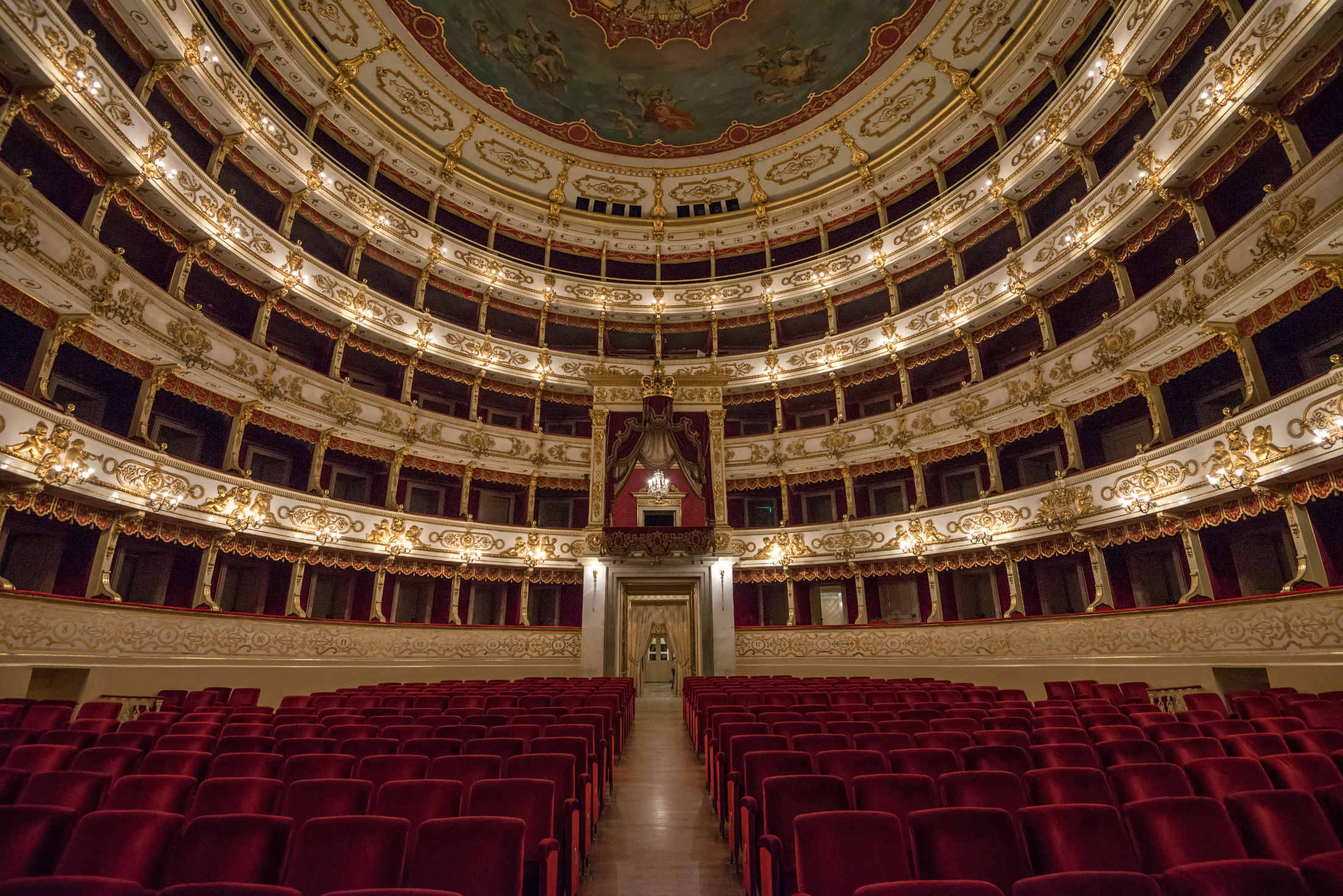
Opera was shot at the Teatro Regio in Parma.

Filming began in April 1987. The film was Argento's most expensive to date, initially budgeted at 10 billion lire, but was later reduced to seven billion. The scene shot from the ravens point of view around the theatre cost 1 billion lire on its own. Initially, the film was to be produced by Goffredo Lombardo, the head of Titanus. A corporate split between Titanus away from distribution lead to a split in interest in backing the film. It was backed by the production company from Mario and Vittorio Cecchi Gori; the brothers had ties to Italy's national television network RAI, allowing them to organize a presale for the film that gave Argento a larger budget than he had usually worked with. Additional filming took place in Lugano, Switzerland with interiors shot at De Paolis Studios in Rome. Argento had written the role of Mara Cecova for Vanessa Redgrave, who dropped out shortly before production began, leading first to Nicolodi being cast in the part, then the character's role in the film being severely reduced. In the final film, Cecova is portrayed only through point-of-view camera shots and voiceover, and Nicolodi played Betty's agent Mira instead. On set, Alan Jones reported that Opera had been an "arduous 15 week shoot". Marsillach stated she received real burns from the multiple takes she needed during the scene where she is tied to a chair in a burning room.

== Soundtrack ==
Title	Performer/Composer	Publisher
"White Darkness"; "Balance"; "From the Beginning"	Brian Eno and Roger Eno	By Arrangement with Opal Ltd, London
"Opera"; "Crows"; "Confusion"	Claudio Simonetti	By Arrangement with BMG Ariola-Walkman SRL
"Opera Theme"; "Black Notes"	Bill Wyman and Terry Taylor	By Arrangement with Ripple Music Ltd.
"Knights of the Night"; "Steel Grave"	Steel Grave a.k.a. Gow	By Arrangement with Franton Music/Walkman SRL
"No Escape"	Norden Light	By Arrangement with Sonet
"Casta Diva"	From "Norma". Composed by Vincenzo Bellini.	
"Amami Alfredo"; "Sempre libera"	From "La Traviata". Composed by Giuseppe Verdi. Performed by Maria Callas.	By Arrangement with Fonit Cetra
"Un bel dì vedremo"	From "Madama Butterfly". Composed by Giacomo Puccini. Performed by Mirella Freni.	By Arrangement with PolyGram (as Poligram)
"Macbeth" (excerpts); Act 1 Finale; Act 2 "Vieni! T'affretta!"; Act 3 "Witch's Chorus"	Composed by Giuseppe Verdi. Performed by Elizabeth Norberg-Schulz (as Elisabetta Norberg Schulz) soprano, Paola Leolini Soprano, Andrea Piccinni (as Andrea Piccini) Tenor, Michele Pertusi Baritone, with "Arturo Toscanini" Symphonic Orchestra of Emilia and Romagna. Recorded at the Elite Studio of Sermide (MN)	

== Release ==
Opera was released in Italy on 19 December 1987 by CDI Compagnia Distribuzione Internazionale, the Italian division of the U.S.-based Orion Pictures. The film was initially going to be released in the United States through Orion Pictures in a truncated cut that eliminated almost thirty minutes of footage, including the ending in the Swiss Alps. Orion ultimately scrapped the theatrical release for American cinemas, and the film also failed to find a theatrical release in the United Kingdom. Despite Orion's backing out of distribution, Opera did eventually receive limited releases in the United States, premiering at the New Community Cinema in Long Island, New York on 26 July 1990, followed by small regional theatrical engagements in Helena, Montana on 10 August 1990, in Austin, Texas on 31 August 1990, and in Santa Fe, New Mexico on 18 September 1990.

=== Home media ===
Opera was released on home video in Australia, Japan, the United States and the United Kingdom as Terror at the Opera.

Anchor Bay Entertainment released the film in a limited edition multi-disc DVD set featuring the film's original score on compact disc in 2001. A standard edition was issued on 30 October 2001 after a recall on the former edition due to a defective disc in some pressings.

In 2018, Scorpion Releasing issued the film on Blu-ray in the United States. A deluxe collector's edition Blu-ray was released by Ronin Flix on 25 March 2019. On 7 July 2024, Severin Films released a limited five-disc set featuring both 4K UHD Blu-ray and standard Blu-ray editions, including the original score on compact disc. The film's restoration for the release was undertaken by cinematographer Karim Hussain. Severin issued a three-disc standard edition of the 4K UHD Blu-ray on 28 January 2025.

In France, Le Chat qui Fume released a three-disc Blu-ray/DVD collector's edition in 2017. The edition contained more than four hours of supplementary features and an alternative English-language audio track prepared for the film's presentation at the 1987 Cannes Film Market.

In Italy, CG Entertainment organised a crowdfunding campaign in 2017 for a limited Blu-ray/DVD collector's edition. The project reached its funding threshold of 300 pre-orders, with the edition limited to 500 numbered copies. The first 300 pre-ordered copies included Dario Argento's autograph. The set also featured a 120-page book prepared by Davide Pulici of Nocturno, three collectible postcards, interviews and previously unreleased behind-the-scenes footage.

In the United Kingdom, Cult Films released Opera in a dual-format Blu-ray and DVD edition on 21 January 2019. The release featured a new 2K restoration, with colour grading carried out under Argento's supervision using his preferred original theatrical print as a reference. Its supplementary features included a newly recorded interview with Argento titled Aria of Fear, an archival behind-the-scenes documentary titled Opera Backstage, and a featurette documenting the restoration process.

In Germany, Plaion Pictures released Opera, under its German title Terror in der Oper, in a limited five-disc collector's edition in June 2023. The edition included two 4K Ultra HD Blu-rays and three standard Blu-rays, featuring a new 4K transfer prepared by Cinecittà and both the original Italian extended version and the shorter international export version.

== Reception ==
=== Box office ===
Film critic and historian Roberto Curti wrote that the film was a box-office success in Italy, with 706,000 spectators 4,737 million lire grossed.

=== Critical response ===
Opera was critically well-received in Italy. American critic Patrick Taggart of the Austin American-Statesman praised the film as "very smart" but noted that its sequences of graphic violence often overshadowed subplots and some character development.

From retrospective reviews, Adrian Luther-Smith in his book Blood and Black Lace echoed the film as an "exceptional visual experience" and referred to it as a return to form for Argento after the release of Phenomena. Luther-Smith only lamented the use of heavy metal music and what he saw as a "weak ending" to the film.

Ed Gonzalez of Slant Magazine awarded the film a score of four out of four stars, calling it Argento's "last full-fledged masterpiece" and praising the "operatic attention to death and the way in which the film's killer forces Betty's gaze" as "genius".

Patrick Legare of AllMovie awarded the film two-and-a-half out of five stars, calling it "a decent, fairly typical Argento film that is worth watching primarily for its above-average murder sequences."

On the review aggregator website Rotten Tomatoes, 90% of 21 critics' reviews are positive, with an average rating of 7/10. The website's consensus reads: "The Opera house location gives plenty to work with for director Dario Argento, who hits his decadently bloody high notes here." Metacritic, which uses a weighted average, assigned the film a score of 68 out of 100, based on 6 critics, indicating "generally favorable" reviews.

== Legacy ==
Opera has been retrospectively regarded as one of Argento's last major achievements. In a 2023 retrospective for the British Film Institute, Martyn Conterio described the film as marking the end of the director's classic period, singling out the image of Betty being forced to witness murders with needles taped beneath her eyes as among the most memorable in Argento's filmography. Writing for the film journal Kinoeye in 2002, Michael Sevastakis examined the film's expressionistic camerawork and its treatment of voyeurism, violence and psychological trauma, relating its visual style to the broader themes of Argento's cinema.

Film critic Mark Kermode, writing in The Observer in 2011, suggested that Opera and Argento's earlier Suspiria (1977) had provided thematic and stylistic models for Darren Aronofsky's psychological horror film Black Swan (2010). In June 2022, Opera was screened as part of Film at Lincoln Center's 20-film retrospective, Beware of Dario Argento, in a 4K digital restoration by Cinecittà.

== Sources ==
- Curti, Roberto (2022). Italian Giallo in Film and Television. Jefferson, North Carolina: McFarland. ISBN 978-1-4766-8248-8.
- Jones, Alan (March 1988). "Opera". Cinefantastique. Vol. 18, no. 2/3. ISSN 0145-6032.
- Luther-Smith, Adrian (1999). Blood and Black Lace: The Definitive Guide to Italian Sex and Horror Movies. Liskeard, England: Stray Cat Publishing. ISBN 978-0-9533-2611-2.
- Paul, Louis (2015). Italian Horror Film Directors. Jefferson, North Carolina: McFarland. ISBN 978-0-786-48749-3.
