= Budapest Strings Chamber Orchestra =

Professional Hungarian orchestra

The Budapest Strings Chamber Orchestra is a professional Hungarian orchestra.

== History ==
The orchestra was founded in 1977 by graduates of the Franz Liszt Academy of Music in Budapest, beginning life as a septet. It subsequently developed into a sixteen person string orchestra, which was awarded first prize at the International Chamber Orchestra Competition in Belgrad in 1982. Since 1983, the orchestra has performed regularly in the most important concert halls in Hungary. In 1995 it founded the International Haydn Festival in Fertőd. Besides playing the standard repertoire for string orchestra, it performs compositions by Hungarian composers, including Béla Bartók and Leó Weiner. In March 2013, the orchestra performed the world premiere of Robert Gulya's Nutcracker-Variations for guitar and strings at Palace of Arts in Budapest. The chamber orchestra has worked with such notable soloists as Peter Frankl, Johanna Beisteiner and Irena Grafenauer, and has recorded numerous CDs for Hungaroton, Naxos Records and other labels.
