= Eduard Shafransky =

Russian composer

Eduard Shafransky (Russian: Эдуард Моисеевич Шафрáнский; 16 October 1937 – 18 December 2005) was a Russian classical guitarist and composer.

== Life ==
Shafransky was born on October 16, 1937, in the Siberian town Krasnoyarsk. From 1961 to 1965 he studied classical guitar at the Tchaikovsky College of Music in Sverdlovsk (today Yekaterinburg), where he founded the ensemble for old music Renaissance and the music festival Evenings of April. In the last years of his life Shafransky composed several pieces for guitar. In 2002, during a concert in Yekaterinburg, he met the internationally known Austrian guitarist Johanna Beisteiner, who since then played several world premieres of his works, such as Caravaggio oggi for guitar, of which a video clip was published in 2010 by the Hungarian label Gramy Records.

== List of works for guitar solo (incomplete) ==
- Requiem for guitar (World premiere on September 24, 2004, at St.-Blasius Church, Klein-Wien near Furth bei Göttweig, Austria)
- Caravaggio oggi or Reflections on a painting by Caravaggio (World premiere on October 29, 2007, Dom Aktyora, Yekaterinburg, Russia)
- Night in Granada (World premiere on October 29, 2007, Dom Aktyora, Yekaterinburg, Russia)
- Old quarters of Alanya (World premiere on May 18, 2009, Festival Bravo, Yekaterinburg, Russia)
- Songs of breakers (World premiere on May 18, 2009, Festival Bravo, Yekaterinburg, Russia)

== Discography ==
- Johanna Beisteiner: Live in Budapest (DVD, Gramy Records, 2010) with the video clip Caravaggio oggi to music by von Eduard Shafransky; Sample of Caravaggio oggi. on YouTube
