= Sochi Symphony Orchestra =

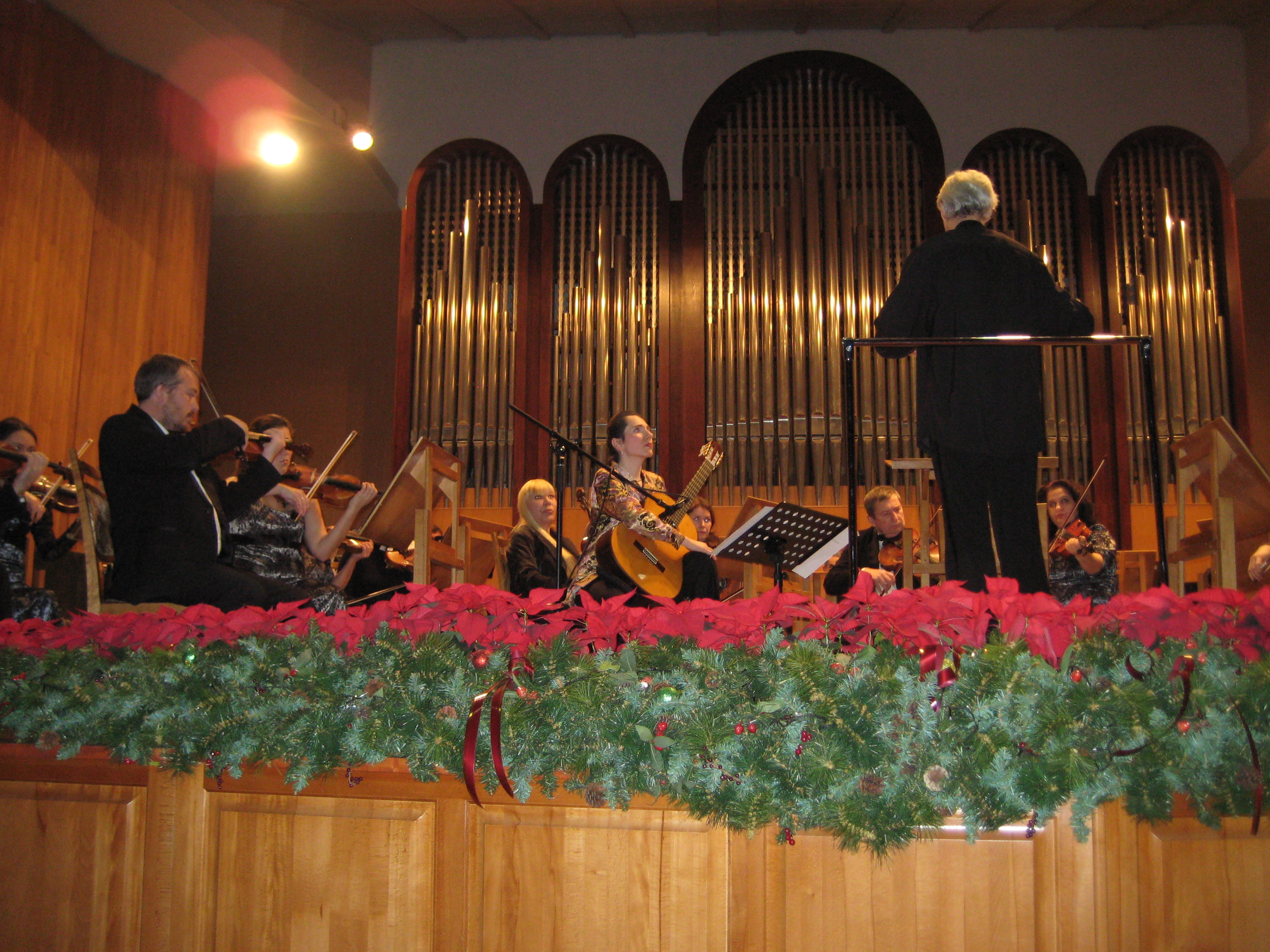

Background information
- Origin: Sochi, Russia
- Genres: Classical
- Occupation: Symphony orchestra
- Years active: 1991–present
- Members: Principal Conductor; Oleg Soldatov

The Sochi Symphony Orchestra is an orchestra based in Sochi, Russia.

== History ==
The orchestra was founded in 1991 as a chamber ensemble, in 2001 it received the status of a symphony orchestra. Its current chief conductor is Oleg Soldatov. The orchestra regularly gives concerts in Sochi and other Russian towns. It performed with internationally known soloists, such as Denis Matsuev and Johanna Beisteiner.
