= Róbert Gulya =

Hungarian-British composer (born 1973)

- Born: 10 November 1973 (age 52); Hungary
- Occupation: Composer
- Website: robertgulya.com

Róbert Gulya (born 10 November 1973) is a Hungarian-British composer. He composes contemporary classical music as well as film scores.

== Life ==
Robert Gulya studied at the Franz Liszt Academy of Music in Budapest, the University of Music and Performing Arts, Vienna and attended a film scoring advanced program at the University of California, Los Angeles. His scores are published by Swiss music publisher Éditions BIM. Inter alia, he created several works for the Austrian guitarist Johanna Beisteiner, such as a Concert for guitar and orchestra, which was performed with the Budapest Symphony Orchestra. Robert Gulya is the owner of the film music production company Interscore LTD.

== Honours and awards ==
- 2014: Cannes Corporate Media & TV Award Winner: Best Music for Where the World Unfolds.
- 2008: Action On Film International Film Festival, USA: Best Score Feature for the film score of Atom Nine Adventures (USA 2007, director: Christopher Farley)
- 1997: Third Prize at the International Composer’s Competition In Memoriam Zoltán Kodály, Budapest (Hungary)
- 1996: Albert Szirmai Prize, Budapest (Hungary)
- 1995: First Prize at the International Summer Academy Prague-Vienna-Budapest (Austria)

== List of works (incomplete) ==
=== Classical works ===
- 1995: Burlesque for tuba and piano
- 1996: Memory of a lost world - a tale of the legendary Atlantis for orchestra and choir
- 1997: Concert for piano and orchestra No. 1
- 2000: Fairy Dance for guitar solo
- 2000: Concert for tuba and orchestra
- 2001: Dolphin’ s voice for piano
- 2005: Moods for brass quintet
- 2006: Capriccio for guitar and piano
- 2007: Night Sky Preludes for guitar solo
- 2008: The Milonguero and the Muse (Tango), first version for guitar and string orchestra (music to the video clip of the same name)
- 2009: Concert for guitar and orchestra. Sample of first movement performed live in 2009 by Johanna Beisteiner and the Budapest Symphony Orchestra conducted by Béla Drahos (Video published in 2010 by Gramy Records)
- 2009: The Milonguero and the Muse (Tango), second version for flute, guitar and string orchestra. Sample of this tango performed live in 2009 by Béla Drahos, Johanna Beisteiner and the Budapest Symphony Orchestra (Video published in 2010 by Gramy Records)
- 2010: Waltz for guitar solo
- 2013: Nutcracker Variations for guitar and string orchestra
- 2013: Concerto '1963 - Piano concerto to Beatles melodies

=== Film scores (selection) ===
- Truce (USA 2004, director: Matthew Marconi)
- The Boy Who Cried (USA 2005, director: Matt Levin)
- S.O.S. Love! (HU 2007, Director: Tamás Sas)
- Atom Nine Adventures (USA 2007, director: Christopher Farley)
- 9 and a half dates (HU 2007, director: Tamás Sas)
- Themoleris (HU 2007, director: Balázs Hatvani)
- Bamboo Shark (USA 2008; director: Dennis Ward)
- Outpost (USA 2008; director: Dominick Domingo)
- Made in Hungaria (HU 2008, director: Gergely Fonyo)
- Illusions (HU 2009, director: Zsolt Bernáth)
- Night of Singles (HU 2010, director: Tamás Sas)
- Truly Father (HU 2010, director: Emil Novák)
- Thelomeris (HU 2011, director: Balázs Hatvani). Sample of the opening theme City of Time
- In the name of Sherlock Holmes (HU 2012, director: Zsolt Bernáth)
- Gingerclown (Hu 2013, director: Balázs Hatvani)
- Tom Sawyer & Huckleberry Finn (USA 2014, director: Jo Kastner)
- Aura (HU 2014, director: Zsolt Bernath)
- What Ever Happened to Timi (HU 2014, director: Attila Herczeg)
- The Ufologist (USA 2014, director: Christopher Farley)
- A lovasíjász (Documentary film, HU 2016. director: Géza Kaszás, Dániel Tiszeker)
- Man in the Mountain (Short film USA 2023, director: Dennis Trombly)
- Hadik (HU 2023, director: János Szikora)
- Now or never (Hungarian: Most vagy soha) (HU 2024, director: Balázs Lóth)

== Discography (incomplete) ==
List of albums containing works by Robert Gulya:

=== CD ===
- 1997: Winners of the First International Composers Competition (Kodály Foundation, CD BR 0156, Budapest, Hungary): album including Piano concerto No. 1 by Gulya
- 2001: Johanna Beisteiner - Dance Fantasy: album including Fairy Dance for guitar solo by Gulya
- 2004: Johanna Beisteiner - Between present and past: album including Capriccio for guitar and piano by Gulya
- 2007: Atom Nine Adventures (Original Motion Picture Soundtrack), Samples on the website of Moviescore Media
- 2007: S.O.S. Love (Original Motion Picture Soundtrack)

=== DVD ===
- 2010: Johanna Beisteiner - Live in Budapest: album of a live performance with the Budapest Symphony Orchestra conducted by Béla Drahos including the world premiere of the Concert for guitar and orchestra and the Tango The Milongaro and the Muse by Gulya

== Samples ==
- Robert Gulya: Concerto for guitar and orchestra (first movement performed live by Johanna Beisteiner and the Budapest Symphony Orchestra conducted by Béla Drahos (Video, Gramy Records, 2010)
- Robert Gulya: Tango The Milonguero and the Muse for flute, guitar and string orchestra performed live in 2009 by Béla Drahos, Johanna Beisteiner and the Budapest Symphony Orchestra (Video, Gramy Records, 2010)
- Robert Gulya: Atom Nine Adventures (Original Motion Picture Soundtrack on the website of Moviescore Media, 2007)
