= What Ever Happened to Timi =

- Film poster
- Hungarian: Megdönteni Hajnal Tímeát
- Directed by: Attila Herczeg
- Starring: Andrea Osvárt; Kornél Simon
- Music by: Róbert Gulya
- Release date: 13 February 2014
- Running time: 105 minutes
- Country: Hungary
- Language: Hungarian

What Ever Happened to Timi (Hungarian: Megdönteni Hajnal Tímeát) is a 2014 Hungarian comedy film directed by Attila Herczeg.
