= Graz Chamber Philharmonic =

The Graz Chamber Philharmonic (German: Kammerphilharmonie Graz) is a professional Austrian orchestra.

== History ==
The Graz Chamber Philharmonic was founded in 2001 by Achim Holub and developed into one of the most renowned Austrian chamber orchestras. It performed many times in Styria, Carinthia as well as the Burgenland and appeared at different festivals. Moreover, the orchestra played with known soloists such as Johanna Beisteiner and the British pianist Nick van Bloss. Since 2023 the artistic director is Markus Bauer, and Chief Conductor is Achim Holub.
