= Béla Drahos =

Hungarian conductor and flautist

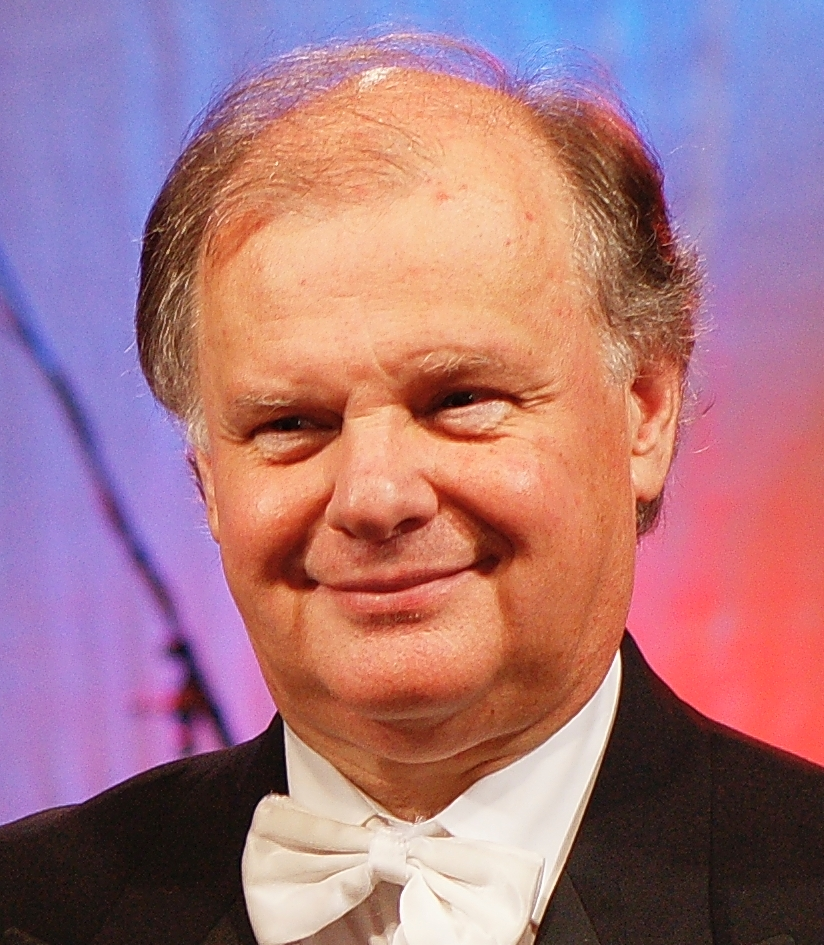
- Drahos after a concert in Budapest in 2009.

Background information
- Born: April 14, 1955 (age 71); Kaposvár, Hungary
- Genres: Classical
- Occupations: Conductor, flautist
- Instrument: Flute

Béla Drahos (born 14 April 1955) is a Hungarian conductor and flutist.

== Biography ==
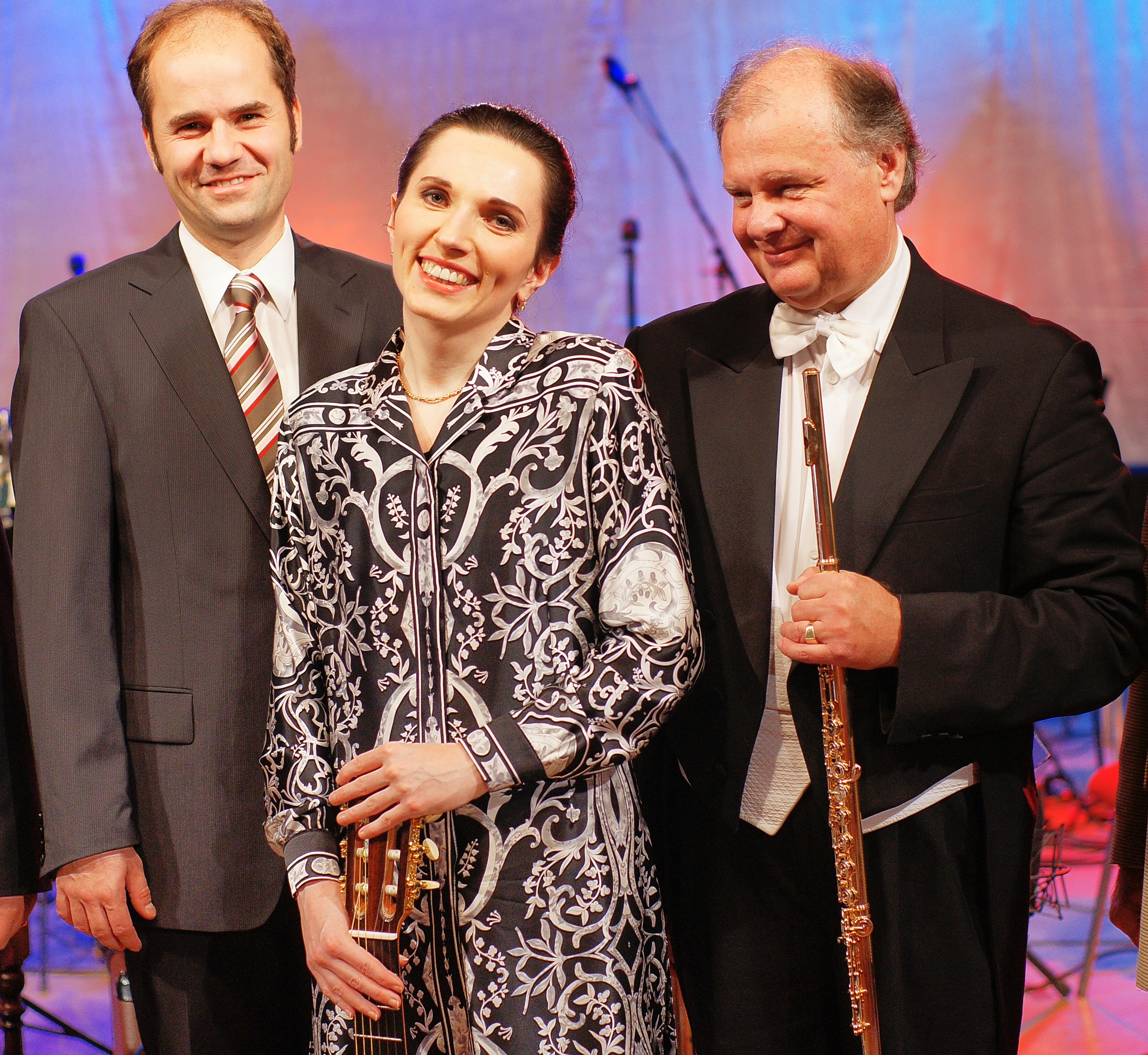
Bela Drahos with the Austrian guitarist Johanna Beisteiner (middle) and the Hungarian composer Robert Gulya (left) after a concert in Budapest in 2009.

Drahos started out as a flutist, joining the orchestra in his hometown when he was just 8 years old. At the age of 12 he became the principal flutist, and as a young man he won several flute competitions. He studied at the Liszt Academy in Budapest, graduating in 1978.

He did not make his conducting debut until 1992 with an all-Beethoven programme. His first recording as a conductor was a disc of three Haydn symphonies for Naxos Records. He has also been soloist and conductor in a disc of Vivaldi flute concerti, as well as conducting flute concerti by Leopold Hofmann with another soloist. Moreover, he worked with the Hungarian composer Robert Gulya and the Austrian guitarist Johanna Beisteiner and published recordings with them for Gramy Records. He was conductor during the recording of the critically acclaimed soundtrack of Hitman 2: Silent Assassin and Hitman: Blood Money, composed by Jesper Kyd and performed by the Budapest Symphony Orchestra and Hungarian Radio Choir.

== Discography ==
- 1992: Bach, C.P.E.: Sonatas for Flute and Harpsichord, Wq. 83-87 (Naxos)
- 1998: Vivaldi: Flute Concertos Vol. 1 (Naxos)
- 2000: Vivaldi: Flute Concertos Vol. 2 (Naxos)
- 2002: Chill with Vivaldi (Naxos)
- 2004: Between Present and past (Gramy Records)
- 2005: Flute Moments (Naxos)
- 2010: Live in Budapest (Gramy Records) Videos of Concerto for guitar and orchestra and the tango The Milonguero and the Muse by Robert Gulya played live by Béla Drahos, Johanna Beisteiner and the Budapest Symphony Orchestra.
