= Djabe =

Hungarian jazz-rock band

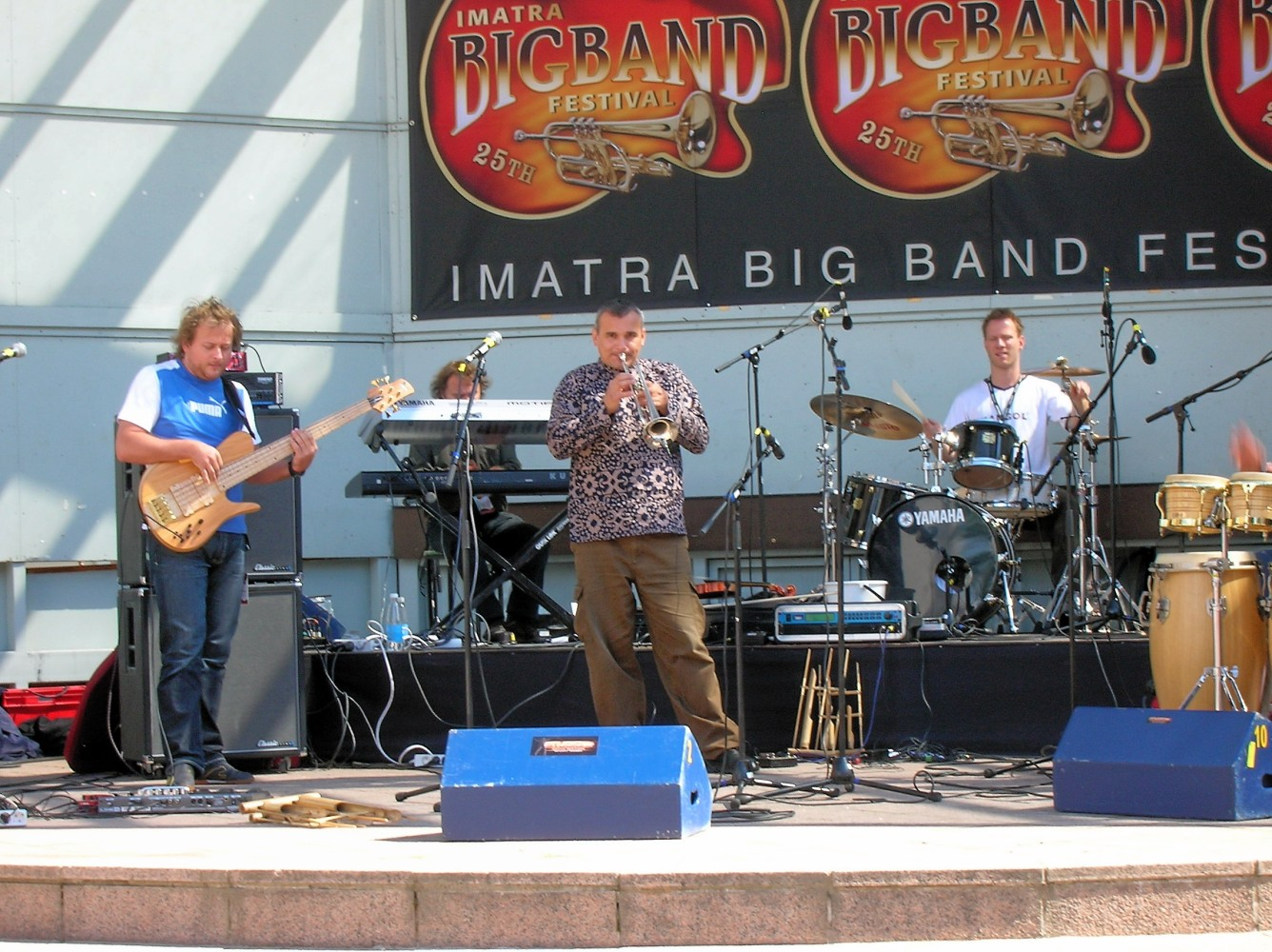
- Djabe plays at the Imatra Big Band Festival 2007 in Finland.

Background information
- Origin: Budapest, Hungary
- Genres: Jazz, jazz rock
- Years active: 1996–present
- Label: Gramy
- Members: Ferenc Kovács; Attila Égerházi; Zoltán Kovács; Tamás Barabás; Szilárd Banai
- Website: www.djabe.hu

Djabe is a Hungarian jazz-rock band formed in 1996.

== History ==
The name Djabe is influenced by the Akan word djabe, which means freedom. The group composes its own works in which jazz style is mixed with elements of Hungarian and African music. The band has performed internationally at several festivals. Moreover, they worked with guitarist Steve Hackett and Ben Castle.

== Awards ==
- 2001: eMeRTon Award for Update (2001)

== Discography ==
- 1996: Djabe
- 1998: Witchi Tai To
- 1999: Ly-O-Lay Ale Loya
- 1999: Lay-a-Loya
- 2000: Tour 2000
- 2001: Update
- 2003: Táncolnak a Kazlak
- 2003: Unplugged at the New Orleans=
- 2004: Gödöllô, 2001. Június 23.
- 2005: Slices of Life/Életképek
- 2007: Message from the Road
- 2007: Köszönjük Sipi!
- 2008: Take On
- 2009: Sipi Emlékkoncert – Sipi Benefit Concert (with Steve Hackett)
- 2011: In the Footsteps of Attila and Genghis (with Steve Hackett)
- 2011: Djabe 15 – 15th Anniversary Concert
- 2012: Down and Up
- 2013: Summer Storms & Rocking Rivers (with Steve Hackett)
- 2014: Forward
- 2014: Live in Blue (with Steve Hackett, Gulli Briem, John Nugent)
- 2016: 20 Dimensions
- 2017: Life Is a Journey (The Sardinia Tapes) (with Steve Hackett)
- 2018: It Is Never the Same Twice (with Steve Hackett and And Gulli Briem)
- 2019: Back To Sardinia (with Steve Hackett)
- 2020: The Magic Stag (with Steve Hackett)
- 2021: The Journey Continues (with Steve Hackett)
- 2022: Before
- 2024: When the Sound Turns Sweet (with Steve Hackett)

== Videos ==
- 2002: Flying – Live in Concert
- 2006: Táncoltak a Kazlak/Sheafs Were Dancing
- 2011: 15th Anniversary Concert
- 2012: Slices of Live

== Personnel ==
- Ferenc Kovács – trumpet, violin, vocals
- Attila Égerházi – guitar, percussion
- Zoltán Kovács – piano, keyboards
- Tamás Barabás – bass guitar
- Szilárd Banai – drums
