= Andrea Osvárt =

Hungarian actress, producer and former fashion model

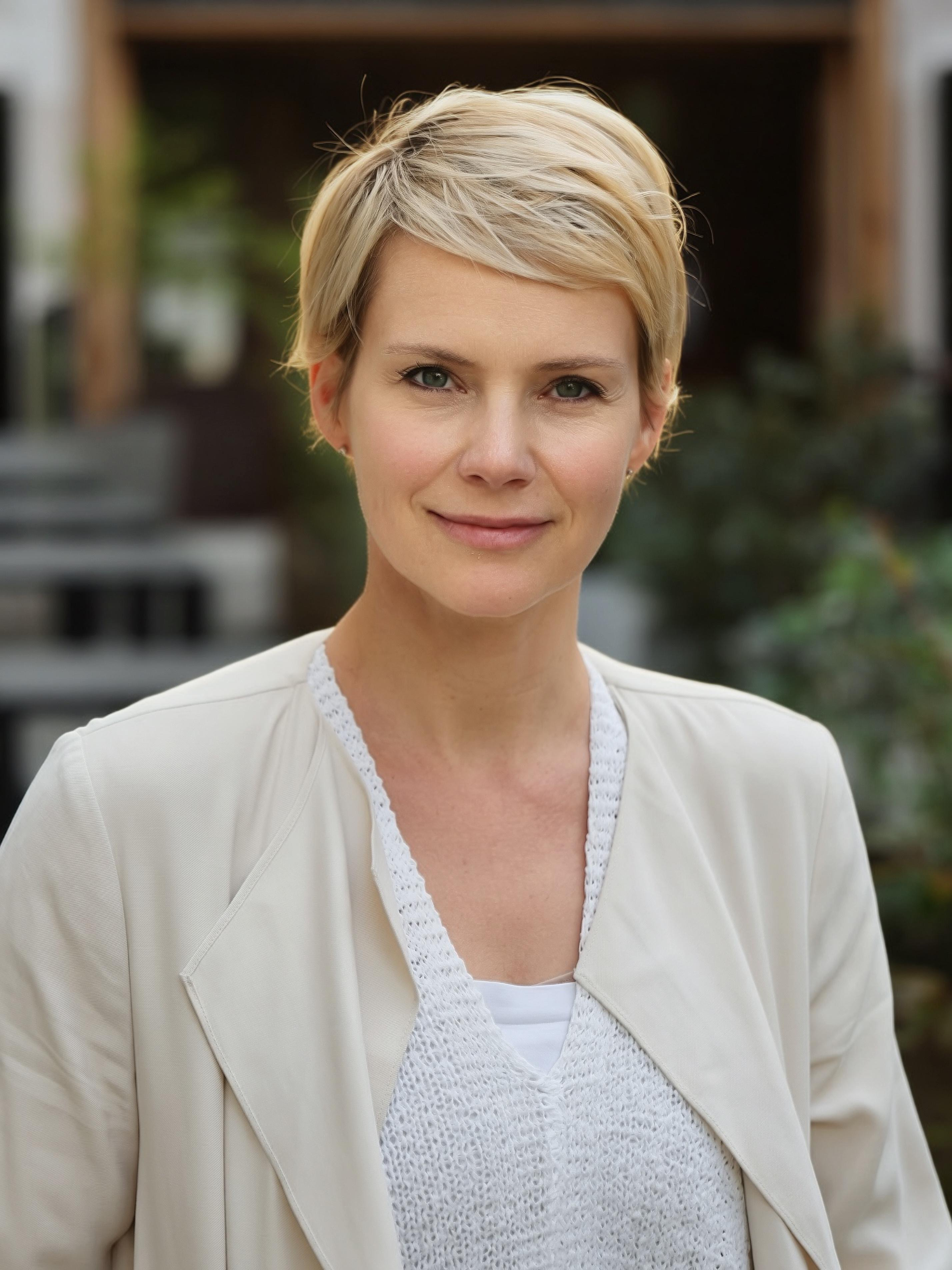
- Osvárt in 2026
- Born: Andrea Klára Osvárt; 25 April 1979 (age 47); Budapest, Hungary
- Occupations: Actress; film producer; former fashion model
- Years active: 2000–present
- Partner: Milan Gauder
- Children: 1
- Website: andreaosvart.com

Andrea Klára Osvárt (born 25 April 1979) is a Hungarian actress, film producer, and former fashion model.

== Personal life ==
She was born in Budapest and grew up in Tamási, a small town in the south of Hungary. Her parents divorced when she was five. Her father is a veterinarian. She has one older full sister, Judit Osvárt. She also has two paternal half-siblings from her father second marriage, Roxana Osvárt and Dr. András Osvárt Jr, and one maternal half brother , Márton Pruck. Osvárt attended N.2. Public School in Tamási, Zoltán Kodály Italian-Hungarian High School, and majored in Italian studies at the Faculty of Humanities of Eötvös Lóránd University, Budapest.

She is fluent in Hungarian, English and Italian, and speaks some German and French.

== Career ==
She began modeling at the age of 16 and subsequently came second in the Hungarian "Look of the Year" competition in 1996. She moved to Budapest and began modeling professionally in Europe, Asia, and North America. She has also made more than 30 television commercials.

She played a small role in the film Spy Game, which starred Robert Redford and Brad Pitt. She decided to leave behind modeling and focus on her acting career. For one year, she attended the Földessy Margit Acting School in Budapest. She was later admitted in the biennial International Acting School in Rome, Italy, where she has lived since 2003. She also attended a screen-writing course at the Schilling-Moharos Screenwriter School in Hungary.

The 2018 short film, Susotázs, in which she plays, made the Oscar Shortlist in the Live Action Short Film category for the 91st Academy Awards.

Since 2012, she has been the managing director of Amego Film Kft. From 2020 – 2021, she was Community Chief Patron at the Margit Negyed Programme in the 2nd District Municipality of Budapest.

Osvart is the member of the margit-negyed Decision Preparation and Advisory Board (MNDTT), where she serves as community Patron.

== Filmography ==
Acting

Year	Film	Role	Notes
2000	Contaminated Man	Hotel Maid	
2001	Első generáció	Csilla	Tv series (episodes#1.6-10)
2001	Spy Game	Muir's Cousin	uncredited
2003	Kistestvèr	Orsolya Kalmàr	
2003	Tea	Florist	Tv series (one episode: La trappola)
2004	Surface	Surface	short
2004	Diritto di difesa	Nadia	TV series (one episode: "La trappola")
2004	Sara May	Ragazza in corridoio	
2005	La caccia	Tania	TV movie
2005	The Clan	Patricia	Hungarian movie
2005	Il bell'Antonio	Julia	TV mini-series
2005	Casanova	Fair Haired Beauty	uncredited
2006	The Dark Sea	Valentina Martini	
2007	Exodus	Sarah	TV movie
2007	Two Tigers	Gilda	TV series
2007	Pompei	Valeria	TV mini-series
2007	Il rabdomante	Harja	
2007	2061: An Exceptional Year	Unna	
2008	Soundtrack	Linda	TV mini-series
2008	Una piccola storia	Martina	TV mini-series (Part 2)
2009	Duplicity	Stunning Blonde	
2009	The Valley	Giulia	
2009	Poligamy	Girl 13	
2009	Sisi	Kaiserin Eugenie	TV mini-series (Part 2)
2010	Lo scandalo della Banca Romana	Renata	TV mini-series
2010	The Swing Girls	Alexandra Lescano	TV mini-series (two episodes: "Prima parte" and "Seconda parte")
2010	The End Is My Beginning	Saskia Terzani	
2010	Visions of Murder	Annalisa Dossi	TV movie
2011	The Sunday Woman	Anna Carla Dosio	TV series
2011	Maternity Blues	Clara, Co-producer	
2012	Expired	Producer	short
2012	Transporter: The Series	Carla Valeri	TV series
2013	Aftershock	Monica	American-Chilean movie
2014	What Ever Happened to Timi	Hajnal Tímea	Hungarian movie
2015	Worlds Apart	Elise	Greek movie
2015	The Manny	Helen	German movie
2016	In search of Fellini	Cabiria	American movie
2016	Madeleine	producer	Italian-Hungarian movie
2016	Blindspot	producer	Hungarian movie
2017	Eleonora	co-writer, producer	American movie
2018	Susotázs	Lady	short
2018	Natale a cinque stelle	Berta Molnar	Italian; comedy
2022	The Therapy	Isabelle	Amazon Prime series, original German language psychological thriller

Producing

- Expired (2011) (Short) - Producer
- Maternity Blues (2011) Clara, Producer
- Yes (2013) (Short) - Women, Producer
- Madeleine (2015) Line Producer, Producer
- Emma (2016) (Short) - Producer
- Vakfolt (2017) Line Producer , Producer
- Eleonora (2017) Actress, Producer
- Földiek (2017) (Short) - Co-Producer
- Above the Clouds (2018) (TV Series) - Co-Executive Producer
- Remélem legözelebb sikerül meghalnod) (2018) Co-Producer
- Natale a 5 stelle (2018) - Netflix Berta Molnar, Line Producer
- Tèkasztorik 2 (2020) Co-Executive Producer
- Adventures Italian Style (2021), HBO, Italy, Exectutive Producer

== Television ==
- First Generation, directed by Szilard Szabo (2001)
- Tea, directed by Gabor Herendi (sitcom; 2003)
- Right of Defense, directed by Gianfranco Lazotti and Donatella Majorca (television episode: "The Trap"; 2004)
- Hunting, directed by Massimo Spano (2005)
- The bell'Antonio, directed by Maurizio Zaccaro (2005)
- Exodus - Dreams of Ada, directed by Gianluigi Calderone (2006)
- Pompeii, directed by Giulio Base (2006)
- 58th Festival di Sanremo (2008), with Pippo Baudo, Piero Chiambretti and Bianca Guaccero (co-host)
- The scandal of the Banca Romana, directed by Stefano Reali (2009)
- Sissi, directed by Xaver Schwarzenberger (2009)
