= Achim Holub =

Austrian conductor (born 1966)

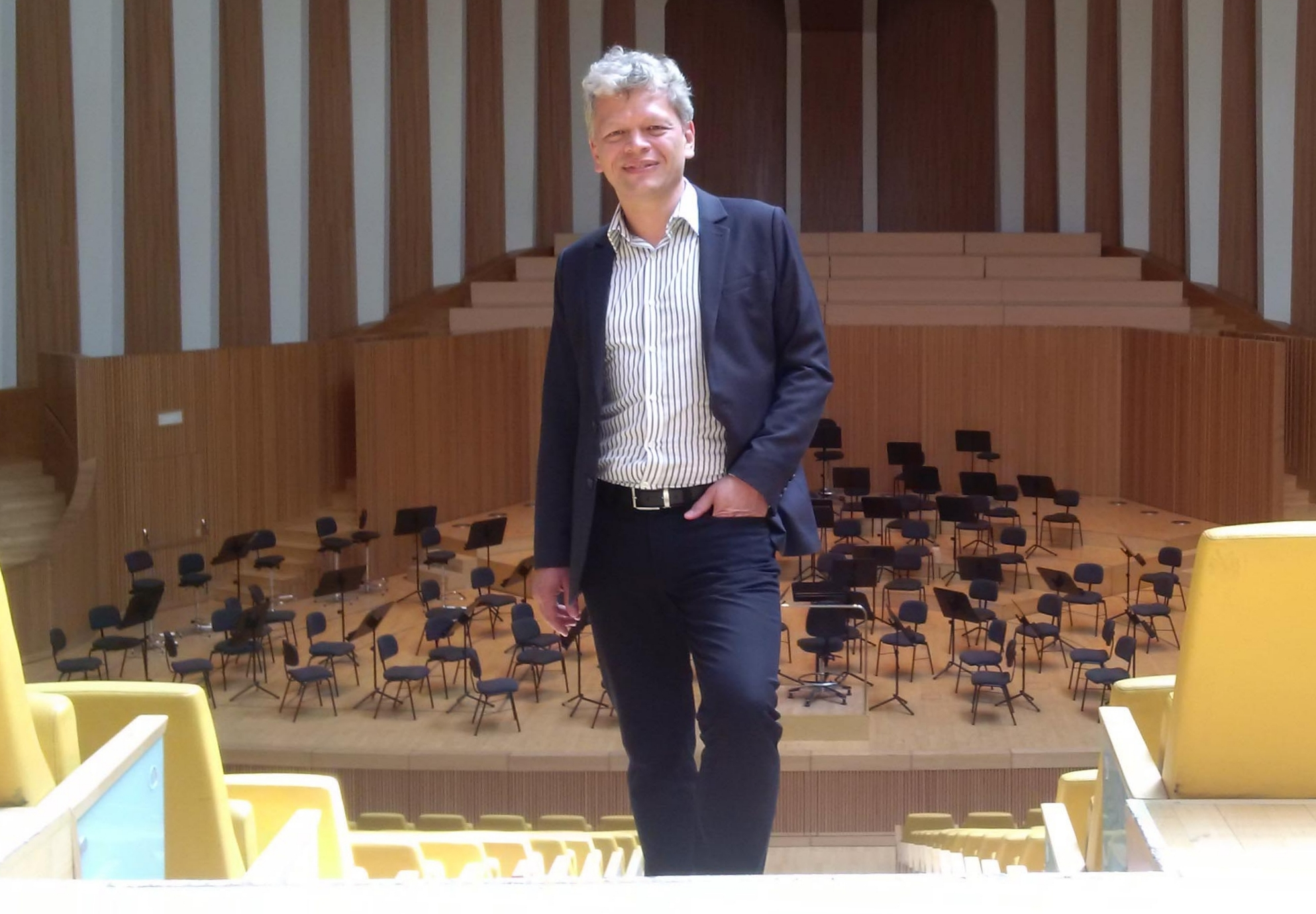
- Born: 1966 (age 59–60); Graz
- Education: Akademisches Gymnasium Graz; Universität für Musik und darstellende Kunst Graz, Mozarteum Salzburg Summer Academy, Accademia Chigiana Siena
- Occupation: Conductor
- Website: http://www.achimholub.com

Achim Holub (born 1966 in Graz) is an Austrian conductor.

== Early life ==
Born in the Styrian capital of Graz, his first musical experiences came at an early age through his mother's, Sofia Holub's, Jazz band. His father Ignaz Eduard Holub was a highly successful, internationally active architect who had close family relations to the famous American writer Arthur Miller (Achim Holub's half-sister Doris stayed for one year with the Miller's at their home in New York State during the 1960s.)

He received his first piano tuition at the age of six, and decided, after initially being extremely attached to Jazz, to become a professional conductor at the age of twelve. At fourteen he became a student of Alois. J. Hochstrasser, the then music director of the Graz Symphony Orchestra, at the Johann-Joseph-Fux-Konservatorium des Landes Steiermark.

== Education ==
In 1984 he became a student of Milan Horvat at the University of Music and Performing Arts in Graz. Among his other teachers were Andrzej Dobrowolski and Georg Friedrich Haas (Music Theory), as well as Wolfgang Bozic (Opera).

He then continued his education with Michael Gielen at Mozarteum University Salzburg Summer Academy, Ferdinand Leitner at Accademia Musicale Chigiana Siena and Hiroyuki Iwaki and Edo de Waart at the Netherlands Symphony Orchestra International Conducting Masterclass in Hilversum and Amsterdam.

In 1991 Sir John Eliot Gardiner offered him, after a selection process which involved 60 conductors conducting the English Baroque Soloists at auditions in Stuttgart and Berlin, active participation at his conducting masterclass featuring operas by Mozart at the European Music Festival in Stuttgart. Among the other selected participants were Ilan Volkov and Bernard Labadie.

In 1993 Sir Georg Solti invited him to a study visit at the Salzburg Festival.

== First professional experience ==
In February 1993 he became Assistant Conductor with the NDR-Sinfonie Orchester in Hamburg for over two years. His first assignment was rehearsing Olivier Messiaen's "Et Exspecto Resurrectionem Mortuorum" for the opening concert of the 1993 Schleswig-Holstein Musik Festival.

From then on he worked as assistant conductor with the Berlin Philharmonic, the Philharmonia Orchestra and the Vienna Philharmonic. Additionally, he was John Eliot Gardiner's assistant at numerous projects in Berlin, Hamburg, Lisbon, London and Vienna, mainly at recordings for Deutsche Grammophon Gesellschaft, but also on tours, at concerts and opera performances.

== European concert activity ==
During the following years, he has been conducting performances with orchestras in Europe, such as the English Baroque Soloists, the now defunct Graz Symphony Orchestra, the Danish National Symphony Orchestra, the NDR-Sinfonieorchester, the Netherlands Radio Symphony Orchestra, the Philharmonia Orchestra (at the Royal Festival Hall London), the Slovenian Philharmonic Orchestra Ljubljana and the Thuringian Philharmonic on a tour through Eastern Germany.

== Graz Chamber Philharmonic ==
In 2002 he became artistic director of Graz Chamber Philharmonic with which he has been giving many concerts with works by Vivaldi, Handel, Bach, Haydn, Mozart, Beethoven, Schubert and Mendelssohn in Burgenland, Carinthia and Styria.

== London ==
In 2005 he moved to London and in 2008 started collaborating with the Orpheus Sinfonia and Firebird, two orchestra projects under the patronage of Dame Judi Dench, performing with them at the most important venues in London and on a tour to Austria.

From 2010 onwards, he has been principal conductor of the London Classical Soloists, which has been performing many of the major classical and early romantic symphonic works, including the complete Beethoven symphonies, within the last years and is currently embarking on the complete Schumann and Brahms symphony cycles.

== Recordings ==
He prepared the offstage music for the Sir John Eliot Gardiner recording of Percy Grainger’s, The Warriors: An Imaginary Ballet for Deutsche Grammophon Gesellschaft and collaborated several times with the Austrian Broadcasting Corporation ORF.

== Collaborations with other artists ==
His collaborations with other artists include pianist Nick van Bloss, violinists Thomas Gould and Leonard Schreiber, cellist Aleksei Kiseliov, guitarist Johanna Beisteiner and singers Barbara Bonney, Rainer Trost, Cheryl Studer and Bryn Terfel.

== Discography ==
- Franz Lehár: The Merry Widow (Deutsche Grammophon, 1994)
- Gustav Holst: The Planets/The Warriors (Deutsche Grammophon, 1995)
