= Tibor Ney =

Tibor Ney (20 April 1906 Budapest - 6 February 1981 Budapest) was a Hungarian violinist and music teacher.

Tibor Ney was the professor of violin at the Franz Liszt Academy of Music, the concertmaster of the Hungarian Radio Symphony Orchestra, and a founding member of the Hungarian String Trio.

== Biography ==
He was born into a musical family in Budapest, his father Bernard Ney and his cousin, David Ney, were members of the Opera in Budapest.

Tibor Ney entered the Academy of Music in Budapest, where he studied violin with Joseph Bloch and Nándor Zsolt, later his master was Jeno Hubay in his masterclass, where he had finished his violin studies receiving his diploma in 1926.

From 1926, he was a member of the orchestra of the Hungarian State Opera in Budapest, but he tried to continue his career abroad, playing in the Berlin Philharmonic Orchestra under the baton of Wilhelm Furtwängler.

Coming back to Hungary in 1932, he became the concertmaster of the Hungarian Radio Symphony Orchestra of which principal conductor was Ernő Dohnányi (the orchestra was known as the Hungarian Symphony Orchestra outside Hungary, adopted the name Hungarian Radio Symphony Orchestra just later). In May 1944, Dohnányi disbanded his ensemble, in 1945, Tibor Ney became once again the concertmaster of the reorganized Hungarian Radio Symphony Orchestra, a post he held until 1966.

He played together as soloist and chamber music partner with several outstanding musicians, just among them the Hungarian pianist Annie Fischer. One of their recordings was the Bach Brandenburg Concerto No. 5 conducted by Otto Klemperer (1950). He premiered Rezső Kókai's Concerto for violin and orchestra (1953). Theodore Strongin on The New York Times commented the disk of Béla Bartók: II. Sonata for Violin and Piano (Tibor Ney, Ernő Szegedi): "A Bela Bartok bonanza has recently arrived, 20-odd disks recorded in his native Hungary on the Qualiton label of Budapest...Bartók's Second Violin Sonata is unlisted in Schwann. Qualiton fills the gap with a performance by Tibor Ney, violinist and Ernő Szegedi, pianist."

He founded the Hungarian String Trio with Martin Banda, Ede Banda in 1948, performing Hungarian and French chamber music with them from 1948 until 1960.

Ney was appointed the professor of the violin at the Franz Liszt Academy of Music (1960–1974).

After retiring from the concert stage, he edited several works of Paganini, G. Tartini and Pietro Nardini published by Editio Musica, Budapest, and Schott Music.

Gyögy Lehel, Hungarian conductor commemorates about him with these words: "he was a musician from a family, which had been enriched the music culture of our country since David Ney. But he was an outstanding violinist as well, delegate of the Hubay school, a real soloist [...] it was not the virtuosity the final goal in his art, but to serve the music, although only a few possessed the technique on that high level as he had."

== Discography (selected) ==
- Béla Bartók: II. Sonata for Violin and Piano (Tibor Ney, Ernő Szegedi), Qualiton HLP M 1552
- Béla Bartók: First Rhapsody (Tibor Ney, Endre Petri), Qualiton LP 1553
- J.S. Bach: Brandenburg Concerto No, 5 in D major, (Klemperer / Annie Fischer / János Szebenyi /Tibor Ney) Hungaroton LPX 12160
- Zsolt Durkó: Organismi, Hungaroton LPX 1298

== Scores (selected) ==
- Paganini: Mose-Fantasia Editio Musica Budapest, 1968. (Tibor Ney)
- Paganini: Moto Perpetuo, Op.11 (Tibor Ney)
- Paganini: Nel cor più non mi sento (Tibor Ney)
- Paganini: 6 Sonatas, Op.3 (Tibor Ney)
- Paganini: Le Streghe, Op.8 (Tibor Ney)
- Paganini: Variations on 'I Palpiti', Op.13 (Tibor Ney)
- Paganini: Violin Concerto No.2, Op.7 (Tibor Ney)
- G.Tartini: Sonata D-dur, 1976, (ISMN 979-000111887-3) (Tibor Ney)

== Media ==
- J.S. Bach: Brandenburg Concerto No, 5 in D major, - Otto Klemperer / Annie Fischer / János Szebenyi /Tibor Ney
- Béla Bartók: I. Sonata for violin and piano - Tibor Ney, Ernő Szegedi
- BélaBartók: Rhapsody No. 1 for violin and piano, Sz. 86, BB94 - Tibor Ney, Endre Petri
