= Nándor Zsolt =

Hungarian violinist, conductor and composer (1887 - 1936)

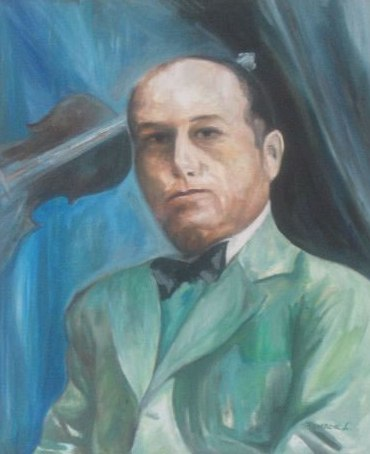
- Born: 12 May 1887
- Died: 24 June 1936 (aged 49)

Academic work
- Discipline: Music
- Institutions: Franz Liszt Academy of Music

Nándor Zsolt (12 May 1887 in Esztergom, Austria-Hungary – 24 June 1936 in Budapest, Hungary) was a Hungarian violinist, conductor, composer and the professor of violin at the Franz Liszt Academy of Music.

He was born in a professional musician family; his father was a conductor and music teacher. After graduating at Esztergom, he entered the Franz Liszt Academy of Music in Budapest, taking violin studies with Jenő Hubay and composition with Hans von Koessler.

After completing his studies in Budapest, he continued his musical career in England, where he became the leader of the Queen's Hall Orchestra in London in 1908 at the age of 21. Nándor Zsolt made his soloist debut in London at The Proms in 1909, playing the Tchaikovsky's violin concerto under the baton of Henry Wood. Later, his compositions were published by the English music publisher, Augener & Co. He also gave concerts in Paris, and also appeared as a conductor in Vienna in 1914. After the outbreak of World War I in 1914, he was forced to spend five years in an internment camp on the Isle of Man, due to his Austria-Hungarian citizenship.

Returning to Hungary in 1919, he became the professor of violin at the Franz Liszt Academy of Music. Among his successful students were Sándor Végh and Tibor Ney. Nándor Zsolt founded orchestras in Hungary, and his virtuoso character compositions were performed in and outside Hungary.

Nándor Zsolt died unexpectedly in Budapest at the age of 49. The music school in his hometown of Esztergom is named after him.

== Selected compositions ==
- F major Romance for violin and piano, op. 1 (1902)
- Symphony
- Violin concerto in D minor, premiered in 1906)
- Toccata
- Air
- Valse
- Berceuse
- Elegy
- In chains
- Satyr and Dryade
- Violin sonata
- Es ragt ins Meer, song for the poetry of Heine
- Der erste Verlust, song for the poetry of Goethe
- Der schwere Abend, song for the poetry of Lenau

== Media ==
- Ede Zathureczky plays Zsolt Nándor: Odonata

== Sources ==
- Szabolcsi Bence - Tóth Aladár: Zenei lexikon, Zeneműkiadó Vállalat, 1965. III. p. 732.
