= Oleg Soldatov =

Russian conductor

Oleg Soldatov (Russian: Олег Юрьевич Солдатов; born 9 January 1963) is a Russian conductor.

== Life ==
Soldatov studied at the Saint Petersburg Conservatory and received his diploma in 1986. From 1990 to 1991 he was the artistic director of the Tomsk Symphony Orchestra, from 1992 to 2006 he headed the Symphony Orchestra of the Karelian Philharmony. Since 1996 he became the chief conductor of the Sochi Symphony Orchestra.

=== Awards ===
- Award of the Government of the Russian Federation in the field of culture (2005)
