= Gramy Records =

Hungarian record label

- Founded: 1999
- Founder: Attila Egerházi
- Genre: Jazz, classical, world music
- Country of origin: Hungary
- Location: Budapest
- Official website: gramy.com

Gramy Records is a Hungarian record label specializing in jazz, world music and classical music.

The company was founded in 1999 by Attila Egerházi. It is part of the Gramy Group, which includes a recording studio, film studio, an office for graphic design and web design, and an advertising agency.

== Roster ==
- Johanna Beisteiner
- Budapest Symphony Orchestra
- Ben Castle
- Djabe
- Béla Drahos
- Steve Hackett
- Chester Thompson
