= György G. Ráth =

Hungarian orchestral conductor

György Györiványi Ráth (born 6 May 1961) is a Hungarian opera and symphonic music conductor. University Professor. Principal Guest Conductor of the Real Symphonic Orchestra of Sevilla, Professor at the University of Győr, former music director of the Opera of Nice (France) the Hungarian Stateopera of Budapest, and the Orchestra of the Budapest Philharmonic Society

== Biography ==
Ráth started his career in 1986 by winning the Toscanini Competition in Parma.

As music director of the Hungarian State Opera, he created the first 3D performance of an opera in the world: Béla Bartok's Bluebird's castle and managed the Opera House over the most sold-out years of the past 25 years.

He was the 10th chairman-conductor of the Budapest Philharmonic Orchestra when he conducted the first time after the composer Mahler his Symphonic poem in two parts, thought lost for a long time. He himself reconstructed the work from the existing manuscripts, for which work he was granted the Doctor Liberalium Artium title from the University of Pécs.

His professional work has been closely connected to the re-discovery of Ernő Dohnányi’s orchestral works, and he conducted Franz Schmidt's Symphony 4 the first time in Budapest, 75 years after its premiere in Vienna.

He is a regular guest conductor in Teatro Colón in Buenos Aires, the Hamburg Staatsoper, the Lyric Theater in Chicago, the Teatro la Fenice in Venice, Teatro Regio di Torino the opera houses in Rome and Nice, and of symphonic orchestras like the Seville Royal Philharmonics, the Symphonic Orchestra of the Italian Radio, the Seoul Philharmonics and the Zagrab Philharmonics. He worked in most countries of the world with artists like Marcello Alvarez, Renato Bruson, José Cura, Daniela Dessì, Norma Fantini, Ferruccio Furlanetto, Maria Guleghina, Sumi Jo, Zoltán Zoltán, Gidon Kremer, Éva Marton, Viktoria Mullova, Leo Nucci, Uto Ughi, Giacomo Prestia, Samuel Ramey, Vadim Repin, Sylvia Sass and Grigorij Sokolov.

Ráth regularly teaches young musicians. He wrote a book on conducting, including his personal experience and things he had learned during his own studies from his Hungarian teachers, László Somogyi and Ervin Lukács, as well as from Franco Ferrara in Italy, Leonard Bernstein and Seiji Ozawa in the United States, Kurt Masur in Germany and Karl Österreicher in Austria.

== Articles and reviews ==
- Nice City Life: concert for the 70th anniversary of Nice Philharmonic Orchestra
- Riviera Buzz: concert for the 70th anniversary of Nice Philharmonic Orchestra
- France 3 about the First Edition of Opéra de Nice Conducting Competition
- György G. Ráth on Opera Magazine
- Performarts: review of Don Giovanni 28 January 2019
- Royal Monaco: György G. Ráth nouveau directeur musical de l'Opéra de Nice
- www.presseagence.fr: György G. Ráth, nouveau Directeur musical de l’Orchestre Philharmonique de Nice
- Il Corriere Musicale (in Italian) review of the CD "In-canto" with music by the composer Silvia Colasanti
- Il Corriere Musicale (in Italian) review of the concert with the pianist Peter Lang
- Reviews and quotes on the personal website of the conductor

== Activity as conductor/music director ==
- Orchestra Giovanile Italiana 1990, 1992, 1993, 1995
- Budapest Philharmonic Orchestra 2011-2014
- Opéra de Nice since 2017

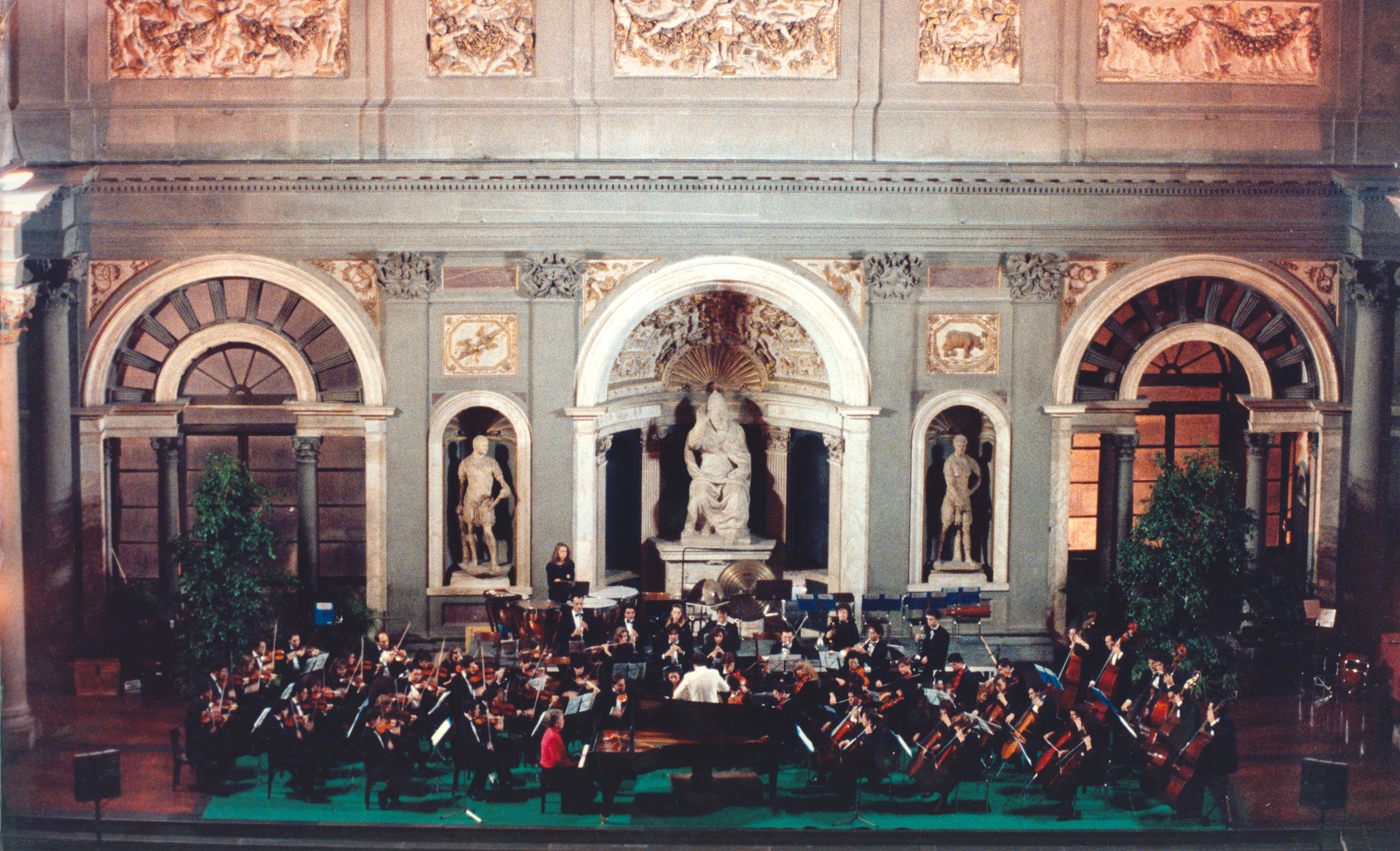
György G. Ráth and Maria Tipo

== Discography ==
- Kamilló Lendvay: Five Concertos; Budapest Symphony Orchestra, Hamar Zsolt, Hungarian State Chamber Choir, Hungaroton
- Béla Bartók: Divertimento - Weiner: Divertimento No. 1 - Kreisler: Altwiener Tanzweisen, Magyar Virtuózok Kamarazenekar, Szenthelyi Miklós
- Carlo Colombara - The Art of the Bass; Orchestra della Svizzera Italiana/György G. Ráth; NAXOS
- Ernst von Dohnányi, Piano concertos; Budapest Symphony Orchestra Orchestra, László Baranyai Piano; Hungaroton
- complete discography on the personal website of the conductor
