= Borg (surname) =

Borg is a common surname in the Nordic countries as well as in Malta.

The Nordic surname comes from the Old Norse borg, meaning "town"; stronghold; castle

Borg may refer to:

- Åke Borg (1901–1973), Swedish swimmer, twin brother of Arne
- Alex Borg (born 1969), Maltese snooker player
- Alex Borg (born 1995), Maltese politician
- Anders Borg (born 1968), Swedish politician
- Andy Borg (born 1960), Austrian singer
- Anita Borg (1949–2003), American historical computer scientist
- Anna Borg (1903–1963), Danish-Icelandic actress
- Arne Borg (1901–1987), Swedish swimmer, twin brother of Åke
- Barbara Borg (born 1960), German Professor of Classical Archaeology at University of Exeter
- Björn Borg (born 1956), Swedish tennis player
- Björn Borg (swimmer) (1919–2009), Swedish swimmer
- Brita Borg (1926–2010), Swedish singer and actress
- Carl Oscar Borg (1879–1947), Swedish-American painter
- Carmelo Borg Pisani (1914–1942), Maltese political activist and spy
- Charmaine Borg (born 1990), Canadian politician
- Christabelle Borg (born 1992), Maltese singer
- Coryse Borg, Maltese actress and director
- Dorothy Borg, American historian of United States – East Asian relations
- Dominic Borg (17th century), a minor Maltese philosopher
- Elin Borg (born 1990), Swedish football defender
- Elsa Borg (1826–1909), Swedish social worker
- Flula Borg (born 1982), German YouTube personality, DJ and actor
- Freddy Borg (born 1983), Swedish football striker, currently with Alemannia Aachen
- George Borg (judge) (1887–1954), Maltese judge and politician
- George M. Borg (1934–1971), American politician
- Gerard James Borg, Maltese songwriter
- Giorgio Borġ Olivier (1911–1980), Maltese politician, twice Prime Minister
- Hasse Borg (born 1953), Swedish footballer
- Jákup á Borg (born 1979), Faroese footballer
- Joe Borg (born 1952), Maltese politician
- Joseph Borg (regulator) (born 1951), American financial regulator
- Katarina Borg (born 1964), Swedish orienteering competitor
- Kevin Borg (born 1986), Maltese singer
- Kim Borg (1919–2000), Finnish opera singer
- Lorraine Borg (1923–2006), All-American Girls Professional Baseball League player
- Marcus Borg (1942–2015), American theologian
- Nicke Borg (born 1973), Swedish singer and guitarist
- O.J. Borg (born 1979), Maltese-British radio and television personality
- Oscar Borg (1851–1930), Norwegian composer
- Parker W. Borg (born 1939), American diplomat and professor
- Paul Borg Olivier (born 1969), Maltese politician, grandnephew of Giorgio Borġ Olivier
- Peter Paul Borg (1843–1934), Maltese theologian, canonist and minor philosopher.
- Ray Borg (born 1993), American mixed martial artist
- Richard Borg, American game designer
- Steve Borg, Maltese footballer
- Tahlia Borg (born 2002), Australian vocalist, drummer and member of Adelaide indie rock band Teenage Joans
- Tonio Borg (born 1957), Maltese politician
- Veda Ann Borg (1915–1973), American film actress
- Vincenzo Borg (1777–1837), Maltese merchant and rebel leader
- Walter Borg (1870–1918), Swedish-Finn communist
- Wes Borg, Canadian comedian and musician
