= Micallef =

Micallef is a Maltese surname. It has been recorded in Malta since ancient times, and its origins probably lie in the name Micali, a variant of Michael (in Hebrew, Michael means "Who is like God?"). However, another possible derivation for the surname is the Maltese word "mħallef", which means 'judge', and thus its origin is not certain. This surname is found in various Medieval records, normally as Makluffi. Prior to the late 15th century, most people bearing this surname were of the Jewish faith.

== People ==
- Antonio Micallef (1867–1940) Maltese musician and composer
- Andrew Micallef (born 1969), Maltese painter and musician
- Corrado Micalef (born 1961), Canadian hockey goaltender
- Ian Micallef (born 1969), Maltese politician
- Jacob Micallef (born 2009), Maltese racing driver
- John Micallef (1923–2003), Maltese philosopher
- Luciano Micallef (born 1954), Maltese artist
- Richard Micallef (born 1989), Maltese musician, member of Firelight
- Roxanne Micallef (born 1997), Maltese footballer
- Shaun Micallef (born 1962), Australian comedian
- Tarki Micallef (born 1961), Welsh footballer
- Joseph R. Micallef (born 1956), Maltese judge
