= Busuttil =

Busuttil is a Maltese surname, probably a derivative of the medieval Maltese surname Busittin – meaning master of 60 men. Notable people with the surname include:

- Albert Busuttil (1891–1956), Maltese philosopher
- Carmel Busuttil (born 1964), Maltese footballer
- George Busuttil (born 1939), Maltese diplomat
- Jeanne-Marie Busuttil (born 1976), French golfer
- Simon Busuttil (born 1969), Maltese politician
- Vincenzo Busuttil (1860–1922), Maltese poet
- Julia Busuttil (born 1988), Maltese-Australian cookbook author
