= Bezzina =

Bezzina is a Maltese surname. Most people bearing the surname were descendants of Emirs on the islands of Sicily and Malta. Another branch descended from Giuseppe de Bezzina, a former slave, and his slave wife, Gioannella de Bartolo around 1570. Their descendants are from the Maltese villages of Għargħur, Mġarr, Mosta and Naxxar.

Notable people with the surname include:

- Dominic Bezzina (18th/19th centuries), Maltese philosopher
- Emmy Bezzina (born 1947), Maltese politician
- Gianluca Bezzina (born 1989), Maltese doctor and pop singer
- Gilbert Bezzina, French violinist and conductor
- Johann Bezzina (born 1994), Maltese footballer
- Marcon Bezzina (born 1985), Maltese judoka
- Steve Bezzina (born 1987), Maltese footballer
- Toni Bezzina, Maltese politician

== See also ==
- Bezzina (fly), genus of fruit fly named after entomologist Munro Bezzina
