= Friggieri =

Friggieri is a Maltese surname. Notable people with the surname include:

- Joe Friggieri (born 1946), Maltese philosopher, poet, playwright, and theatre director
- Oliver Friggieri (1947–2020), Maltese poet, novelist, literary critic, and philosopher
