= Henry Regnand =

Maltese philosopher

- Born: Malta
- Died: Malta
- Occupation: Philosophy

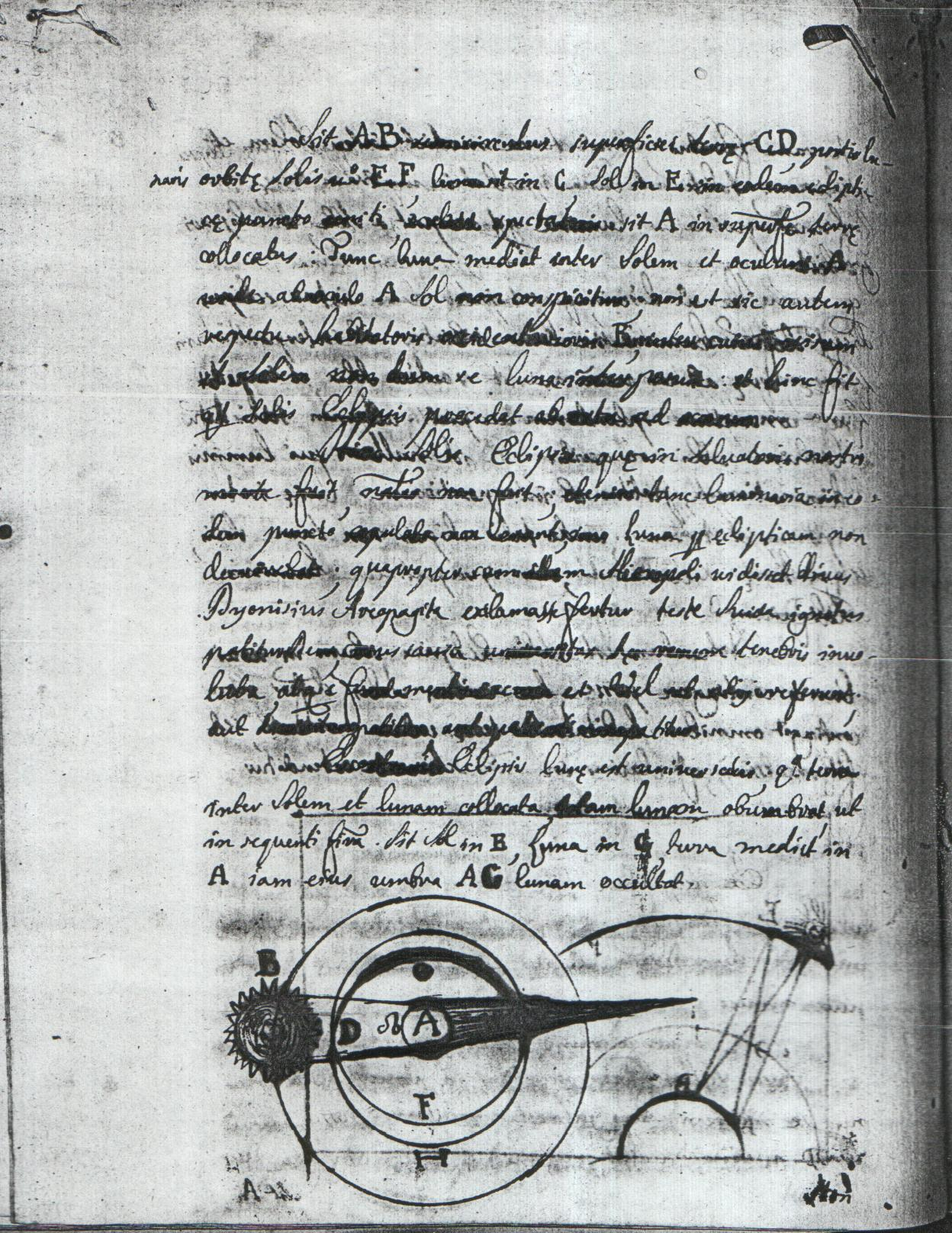
A page from Henry Regnand's manuscript Tractatus de Meteoris

Henry Regnand (18th century) was a minor Maltese philosopher who specialised mainly in logic and metaphysics.

== Life ==
Little is known as yet about the private life of Regnand. He probably was a Dominican friar, but this is still unconfirmed sufficiently by documentary evidence. As an academic, he flourished during the first decade of the 18th century. At that time, he was active teaching philosophy at the Dominican Studium Generale of Portus Salutis at Valletta, Malta. No portrait of Regnand seems to have survived.

== Extant works ==
Despite the dearth of biographical data concerning Regnand, we do possess a number of interesting manuscripts which bear witness to his expertise and ability at philosophical speculation. All of these documents are held at the archive of the Dominicans at Valletta, Malta. They are written by Regnand in his neat and beautiful handwriting. All of them are in Latin, and follow the typical style, in content as in methodology, of Scholasticism. Some of his works are interesting philosophical examinations of natural phenomena, especially those observable in outer space. As yet none of them have ever been transliterated, much less translated into any modern language, or even freshly read and studied. They are the following:

- 1706 – Tractatus De Viventibus (A Study on Living Beings); 39 back to back folios. This is a study in natural philosophy (or the philosophy of nature) based upon the teachings of Aristotle.
- 1706 – Metaphysica ad mentem Renati des Cartes (On Metaphysics according to the Thought of René Descartes); 29 back to back folios. Despite its title, the study does not adhere to Descartes' philosophy; on the contrary, it is a critique of Descartes on the basis on Aristotle's doctrines.
- 1709 – Logica (On Logic); 40 back to back folios. The study explores various aspects of Aristotelian logic with particular reference to Descartes' contributions on the respective themes.
- c. 1709 – Tractatus de Ortu et Interitu (A Study on Birth and Death); 30 back to back folios. This is a metaphysical exposition based on the doctrines of Aristotle, particularly as found in his On Coming-To-Be and Passing Away.
- Undated – Naturalis Philosophia (Natural Philosophy); 96 back to back folios. Deals with Aristotelian natural philosophy.
- Undated – Tractatus de Celo et Mundo (A Study on the Heavens and the Earth); 51 back to back folios. The study basically explores Aristotelian astronomy. The manuscript includes some interesting hand-drawn designs about the positions of the Earth and moon in relation to the sun and to each other. Others are about the nature of an eclipse.
- Undated – Tractatus de Meteoris (A Study on Meteorites); 59 back to back folios. Explores the nature of meteorites, especially through the fundamentals proposed by Aristotle.

== See also ==
- Philosophy in Malta
