= Sandra Dingli =

Maltese philosopher

- Born: 1952 (age 73–74); Paceville, Malta
- Occupation: Philosopher

Sandra Dingli (born 1952) is a Maltese philosopher mostly specialised in Creative Thinking.

== Life ==
Dingli was born on 12 May 1952 at Paceville, Malta. She started attending philosophy and language courses at the University of Malta, and later proceeding to graduate courses at the same university. She acquired a Bachelor of Arts and a Masters in Philosophy, and proceeded to obtain a Doctorate in Philosophy from Durham University in England.

In 1992 she was appointed in the role of Director of the Edward de Bono Institute for the Design & Development of Thinking at the University of Malta. This gave her a golden opportunity to show her skills as an international organiser and as a philosopher. She is no longer Director of the Institute but she retains her position as a full Professor at The Edward de Bono Institute, University of Malta.

== Works ==
Book

- 2005 – On Thinking and the World. This is a 218-page work published by Ashgate Publishing Limited, England in which Dingli selects five particular contemporary philosophical topics which John McDowell deals with and investigates in detail the implications of particular points of view, analysing the current literature on each topic and drawing out shortcomings and possibilities for overcoming them. The work is both a critique and a complement to McDowell's text.

Published editions

Dingli is also the editor of a number of published books, namely:

- 1994 – Creative Thinking: A Multifaceted Approach
- 1996 – Creative Thinking: New Perspectives
- 1998 – Creative Thinking: Towards Broader Horizons
- 2002 – Creative Thinking: An Indispensable Asset for a Successful Future
- 2007 – Creative Thinking: Designing Future Possibilities

Chapters in books

The following are a selection of Dingli's published chapters in books:

- 1999 – 'Creativity in Practice at the University of Malta'.
- 2002 – 'Let's Shake the Apple Tree: Creative Thinking at the University of Malta'.
- 2005 – 'Organisational Creativity and Innovation: Crisis Management or Sustainable Development'.
- 2006 – 'A Plea for Responsibility towards the Common Heritage of Mankind'.
- 2007 – 'Quality Television for Children in 2015’ (with J. Casingena Harper).
- 2007 – 'Reflections on the Creative Climate'.
- 2008 – 'Lateral Thinking: Thinking Out of the Box'.
- 2009 – 'Children, Media and Multitasking' (with S. Pulis Xerxen).

Professor Sandra Dingli's profile, together with her research interests and a link to an up-to-date list of publications may be viewed here: https://www.um.edu.mt/profile/sandramdingli

== See also ==
- Philosophy in Malta
