= Philosophy in Malta =

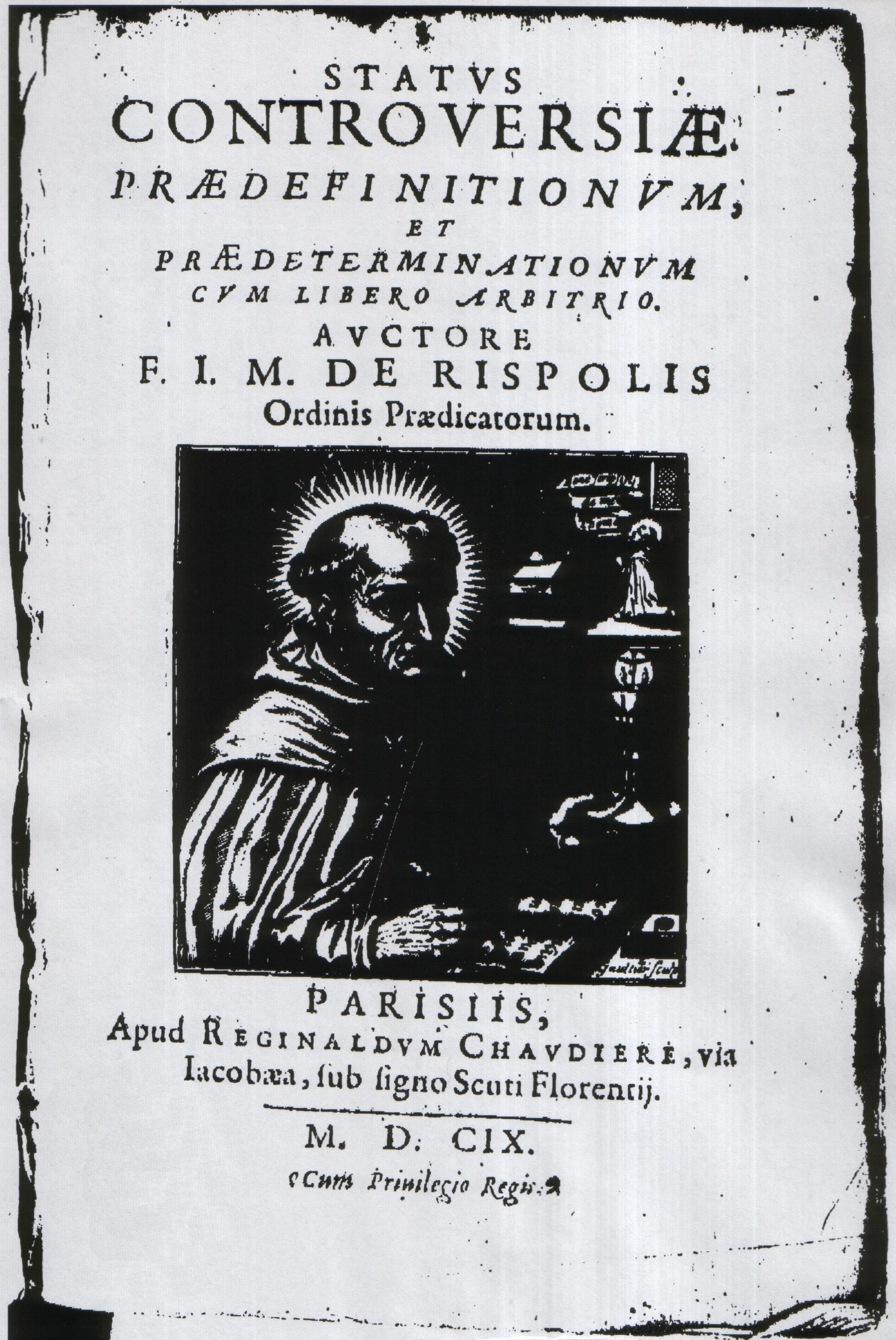
Frontispiece of Rispoli's 1609 magnum opus

Philosophy in Malta refers to the philosophy of Maltese nationals or those of Maltese descent, whether living in Malta or abroad, whether writing in their native Maltese language or in a foreign language. Though Malta is not more than a tiny European island in the middle of the Mediterranean Sea, for the last six centuries its very small population happened to come in close contact with some of Europe's main political, academic and intellectual movements. Philosophy was among the interests fostered by its academics and intellectuals.

For the greater part of its history, in Malta philosophy was simply studied as part of a basic institutional programme which mainly prepared candidates to become priests, lawyers or physicians. It was only during the latter part of the 20th century that philosophy began to acquire an ever-growing importance of its own. Nevertheless, throughout the years a few Maltese academics and intellectuals have stood out for their philosophical prowess and acumen. Despite their limitations, they gave their modest share for the understanding of philosophy and some of the areas it covers.

Though, from the mid-16th century onwards, in Malta philosophy was taught at various institutions of higher education, from the latter part of the 18th century onwards the main academic body which promoted philosophical activity and research was the University of Malta. Today, mainly due to easier access to data sources and to enhanced communication networks, such philosophical inquiries and pursuits are more extensive in prevalence as in content.

== Short history ==
=== Pre-Knights Period (pre-1530) ===
Before the advent of the Knights Hospitaller to Malta in the first half of the 16th century, the Maltese Islands were a forlorn place with little, if any, political importance. The few intellectuals who lived here grew within or around the Catholic religious orders that were present. Their cultural ties were mostly with nearby Sicily. Philosophy was mainly studied as a stepping stone to theology. Back then, Sicily was a celebrated and thriving academic, intellectual and cultural centre, and all local professionals studied there. At the time, the Renaissance was in full bloom. Though the Counter-Reformation played an important part in every academic and intellectual institution, literature issued by the major Reformation educationalists, including Martin Luther, were available and read extensively.

=== Hospitaller rule (1530–1798) ===
The Knights Hospitaller made Malta their island-home in 1530 and remained sovereign rulers of the islands until they were expelled by Napoleon in 1798. As a rule, they cared about education and cultivation as much as their military campaigns and their economic welfare. Though they encouraged higher learning by giving protection to the various colleges and universities that were established (especially by Catholic religious orders), they also kept a very strict surveillance on all aspects of scholarship. They certainly did not like being picked on by the Inquisition, which could make them look bad with the Pope in Rome.

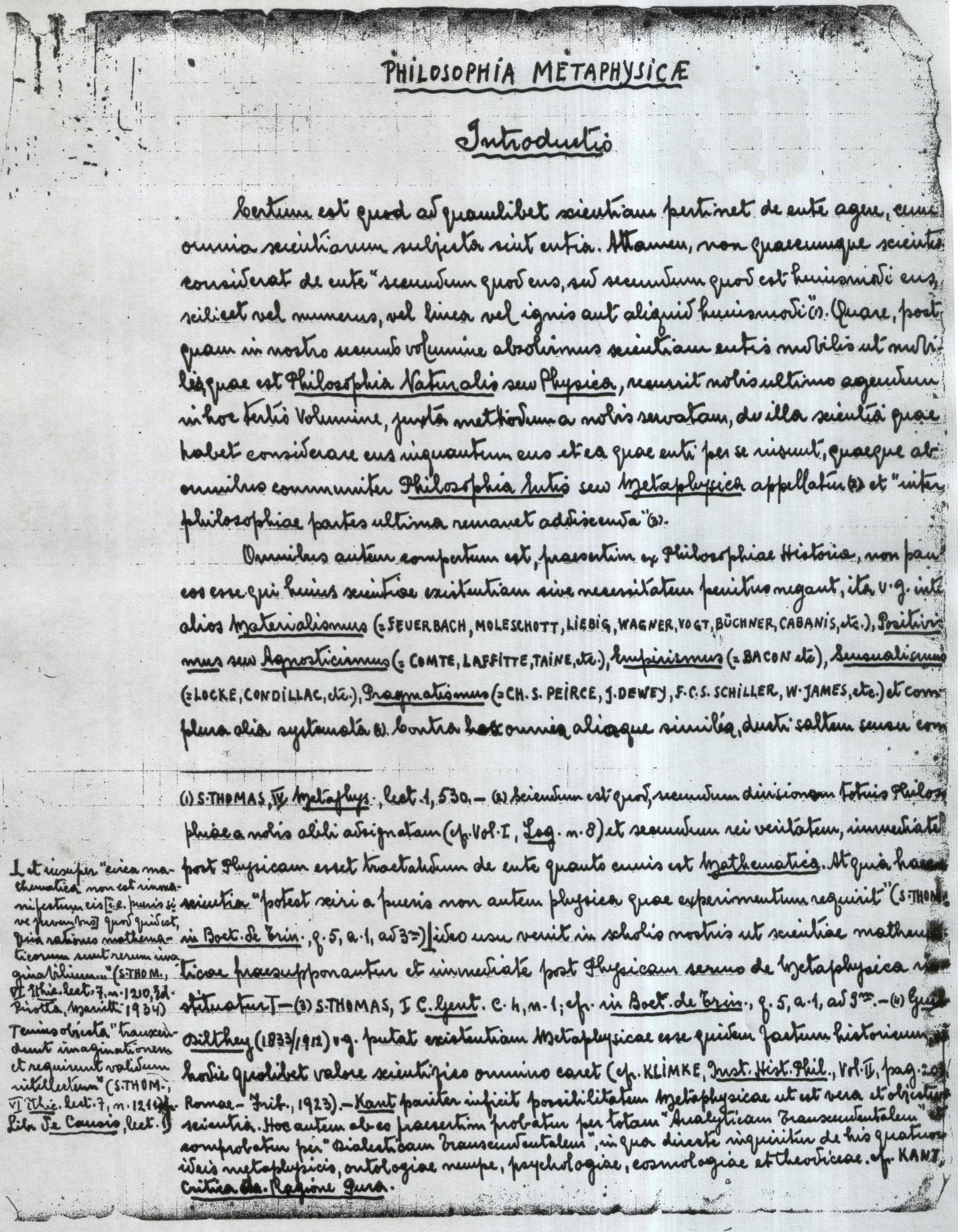
Angelo Pirotta's work on Ontology (1935/40)

Though philosophy continued to be mainly viewed as the hand-maid of theology, some intellectuals had an interest in cautiously branching out along some pathways of their own. Though the philosophical contributions of these masters are fascinating in themselves, prevalent control and restrictions on intellectual activity hardly ever left them room for originality and innovation.

During this period intellectual circles were practically all part of the great movement of Scholasticism, almost giving godlike status to Aristotle. Nonetheless, they were divided into two intellectually opposing camps: the larger group which read the great Stagirite through the eyes of Thomas Aquinas, and the others who read him through the eyes of John Duns Scotus. All of these academics and intellectuals produced large numbers of commentaries, either on Aristotle or on their respective mentor. Their creativity was largely expressed strictly within the confines of their particular school of thought, and this severely restricted their novelty.

During the 18th-century part of the period of the Knights Hospitaller, science and the scientific method began to make head-way over the trenches of the Scholastics. This line of thought was generally not pursued by ecclesiastics, on whom control was more stern, but by lay professionals, especially doctors. These, however, usually had no sway over students registered with academic institutions, which were still rigorously controlled by members of religious orders.

=== Interregnum Period (1798–1813) ===
Towards the end of the period of the Hospitallers in Malta, ideas which had been explosive through the French Revolution of 1789 began to make way into some intellectual circles susceptible to them. They came to full fruition around 1798, when Napoleon Bonaparte invaded Malta and expelled the Hospitallers. However, they were already making the rounds during the decade preceding Napoleon. Of course, these ideas were much influenced by Enlightenment philosophies, especially in France.

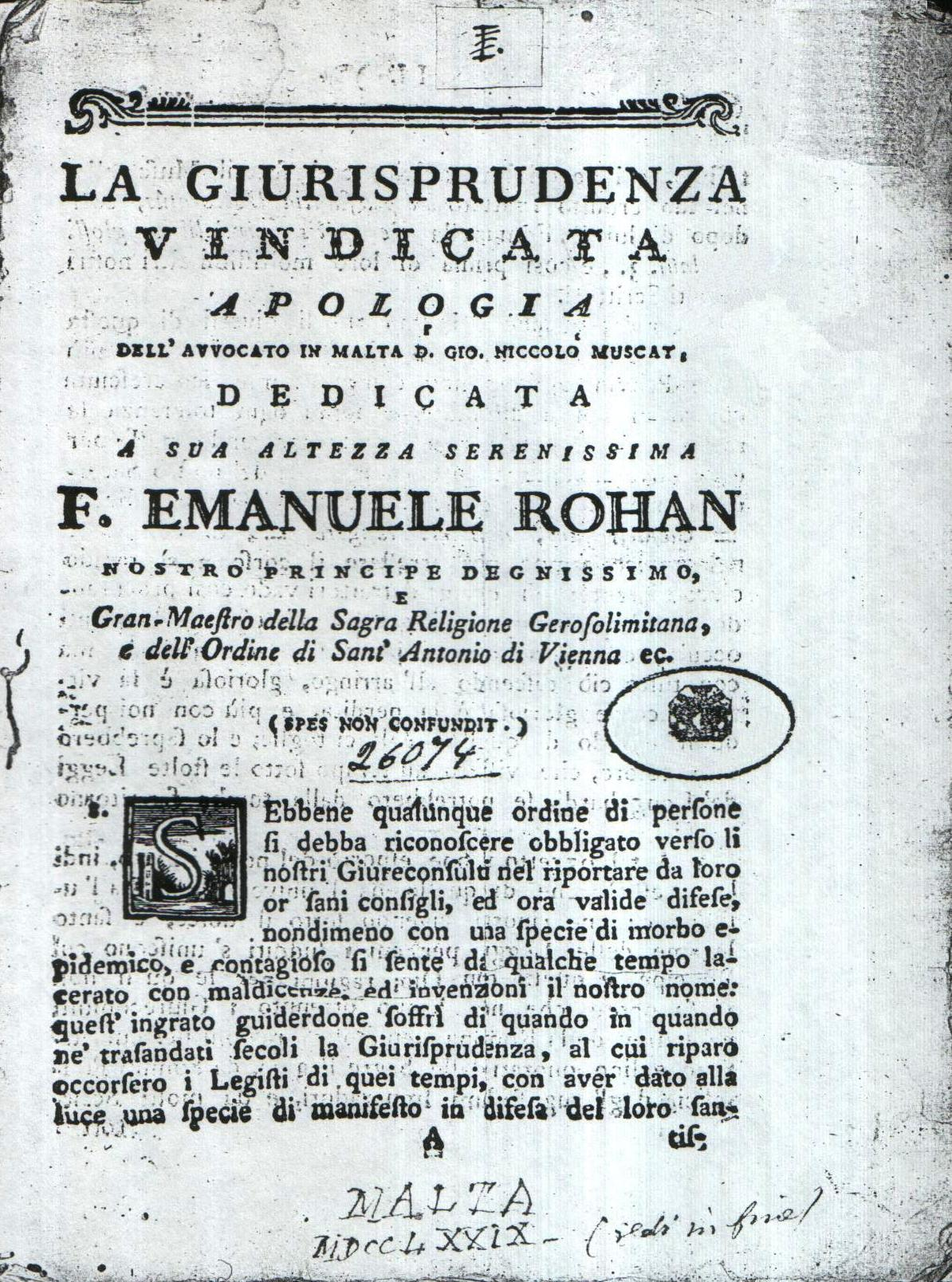
Muscat's La Giurisprudenza Vindicata (1779)

=== British Colonial Period (1813–1964) ===
During this period, the higher schools resumed their business very much as was done during Hospitaller rule. Again Scholasticism came to the fore and flourished. However, this time around, it was the Thomist version which prevailed almost exclusively, even if circumstances, along two centuries and a half of British rule, changed drastically over the years. As in former years, the larger part of the philosophers of this period were ecclesiastics, predominantly members of religious orders. Again, due to censor and control, they hardly ever ventured to propose anything philosophically bold or imaginative. An outstanding exception to all of these was Manuel Dimech, who lived and worked during the first decade of the 20th century. He not only did not adhere to any form of Scholasticism but, furthermore, was a surprisingly innovative and original philosopher and social reformer.

=== Post-Independence Period (since 1964) ===
By the time of Malta's independence Scholasticism had waned and slowly faded away. Very few continued to uncritically adhere to its tenets, and these were restricted to small religious (particularly Catholic) circles.

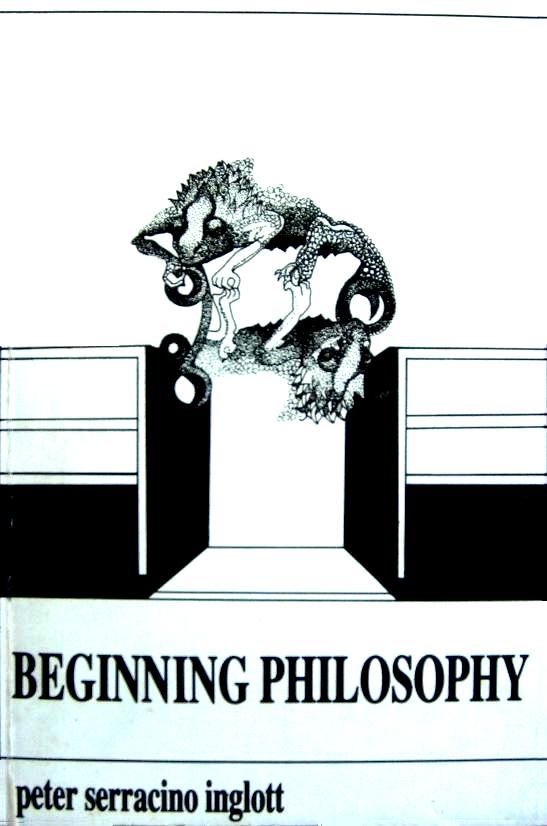
Serracino Inglott's Beginning Philosophy (1987)

Most of the other philosophers became somewhat more adventurous, exploring spheres which were to some extent inaccessible during the British (and much less the Hospitaller) period. In terms of the development of doing philosophy in Malta, Peter Serracino Inglott stands out as all-important, especially from the late 1960s onwards.

Some other Maltese philosophers worked abroad. Though they retained their limited contact with Malta, they of course had a different frame of mind. Their influence on young Maltese philosophers was negligible.

== Chair of Philosophy at the University of Malta ==
The following is the list of professors who held the Chair of Philosophy at the University of Malta, Malta's highest academic philosophy institution. The dates refer to their period of tenure. The chair of philosophy was established in 1771 by the Grand Master of the Knights Hospitaller, Manuel Pinto da Fonseca, when he transformed the Collegium Melitense (Maltese College) of the Jesuits into the University of Malta.

1.	Joseph Moncada	1771–73
2.	Joseph Xerri	1773
	Grand Master Francisco Ximénez de Tejada, brought the activities of the university to a complete stop.	1773–78
3.	Dominic Malarbi	1778–79
4.	Joseph Moncada	1780–86
5.	Michael Xerri	1786–98
	Napoleon Bonaparte suspended the chair.	1798–1800
6.	Saviour Montebello	1800–04
7.	Peter Mallia	1804–22
8.	Jerome Inglott	1822–27
9.	Karl Cicognani Cappelli	1827–29
10.	Joseph Fenech	1829–43
11.	Vincent Paul Galea	1843–59
12.	George Caruana	1859–72
13.	Nicholas Crescimanno	1872–76
14.	Nicholas Zammit	1876–90
15.	Francis Bonnici	1890–1900
16.	Anastasio Cuschieri	1901–39
17.	Saviour Grima	1939–49
	Joseph Sapiano (acting)	1950–51
	Joseph Lupi (acting)	1951–53
18.	Joseph Sapiano	1953–71
19.	Peter Serracino Inglott	1971–78
	Dom Mintoff suspended the chair.	1978–87
20.	Peter Serracino Inglott	1987–96
21.	Joe Friggieri	1996–2012
22.	Claude Mangion	2012–19
23.	Jean-Paul De Lucca	2019–

== Growing awareness ==
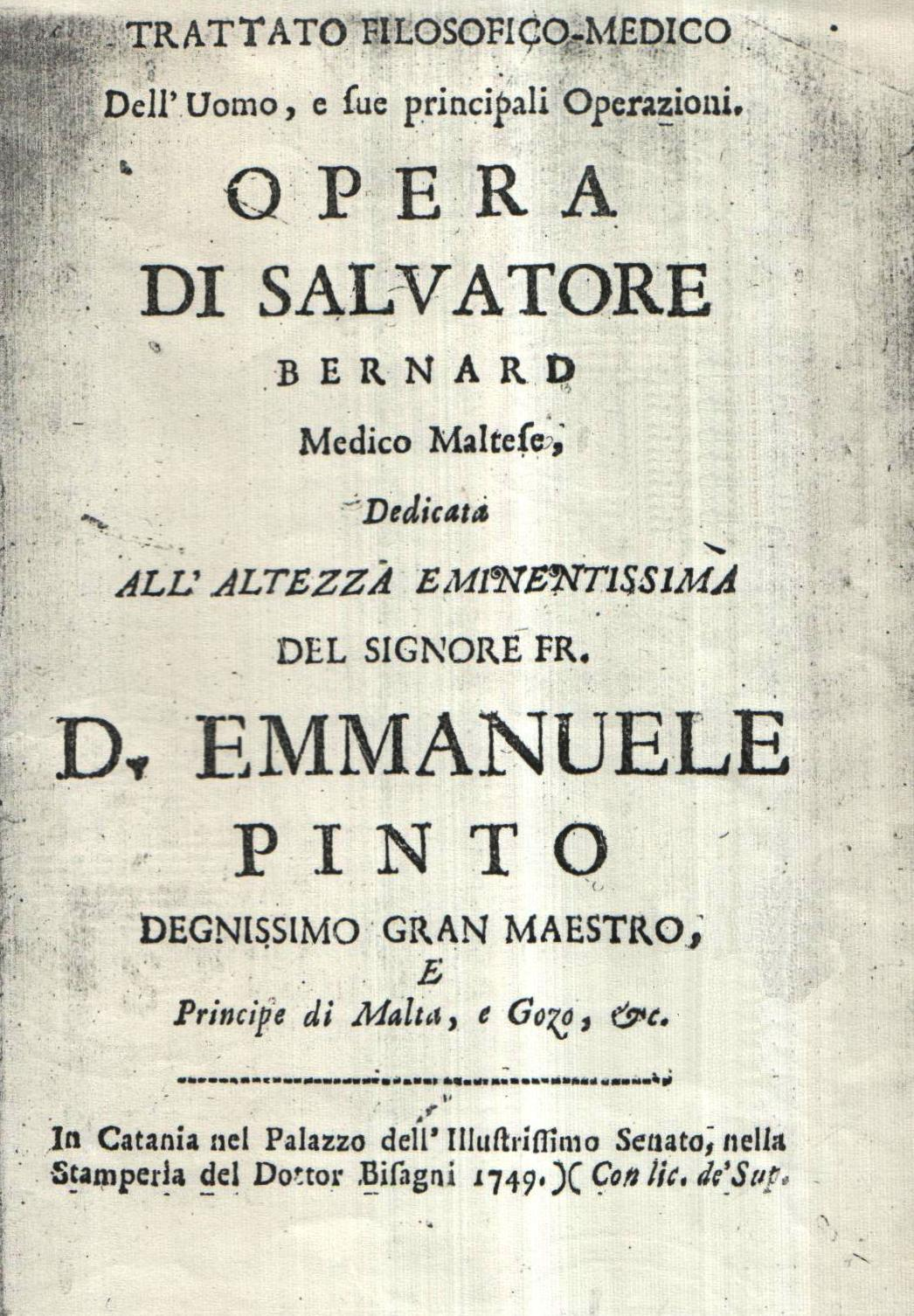
Bernard’s Trattato Filosofico-Medico dell’Uomo of 1749

=== Research ===
Since the 1990s there has been an effort to aptly recognise and duly honour the modest share of philosophy in Malta. The necessity arose for two main reasons. One, because the Maltese themselves, mostly due to a dearth of required research, did not acknowledge, much less appreciate, any local philosophical tradition; and, secondly, because any activity that was being carried out in the philosophical field—whether it was teaching, writing or simply discussing—was done as if the Maltese themselves had, at most, a present without a past.

Archival work revealed names and manuscripts and personalities, text-books were published (1995; 2001) and courses were read at the University of Malta (1996/97; 2012/13; 2013/14) and at other institutions of higher education. A first public conference on ‘Maltese’ philosophy was also organised (1996). A further step was taken by the establishment of Philosophy Sharing Foundation (2012).

=== Appreciation ===
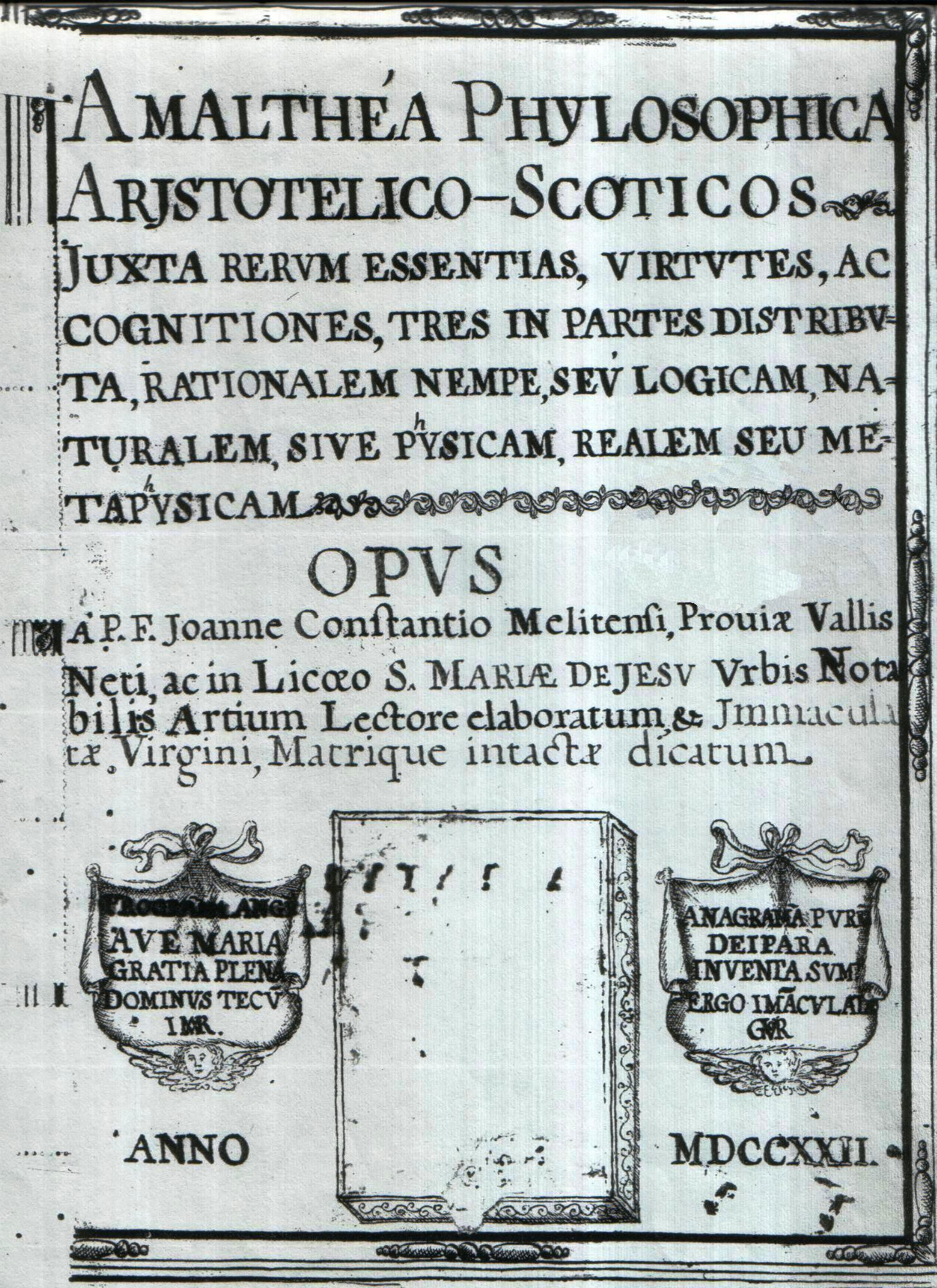
Parnis' Amalthéa (1724)

Since the 16th century, philosophy has contributed to the academic and, sometimes, the intellectual and cultural life of Maltese intelligentsia. In most cases it functioned as a tool of the establishment—including the Catholic Church―to conserve and perpetuate orthodox and official doctrines. In other cases it offered alternative and imaginative routes of thinking. Despite its relatively long philosophical tradition, however, Malta has no particular philosophy associated to its name. Though sometimes innovative and creative, in their large majority Maltese philosophers have always worked with imported ideas and, but for very rare cases (like in the case of Manuel Dimech), seldom did break new ground in the philosophical field. Although the philosophy of many of them did not affect social or political life, some interacted lively with current affairs and sometimes even stimulated societal change. Throughout the ages, Maltese philosophers did not adhere to just one philosophical tradition. The larger part pertains to the Aristotelico-Thomistic school. Every now and then, however, other trends appear along the way, especially during the last quarter of the 20th century, such as humanism, empiricism, pragmatism, existentialism, linguistic analysis and some others. But for unique, rather than rare, exceptions, theism has been a constant trait throughout the whole Maltese philosophical tradition.

During the last thirty years or so philosophy in Malta took an unprecedented twist. Peter Serracino Inglott gave it an extraordinary new breath of life by widening its horizon, diversifying its interests and firmly propelling it into social and political action. This style then was taken up by others who continued this trend.

== Some Maltese Philosophers ==
The following list includes some of Malta's best and most representative philosophers through the ages. Most of the philosophical contributions made by these scholars have lasting significance since they go beyond reflections which are merely descriptive, comparative or contextual. Some of them also appeal for their creativity and style. Others in the list are minor philosophers who contributed to different areas of philosophy.

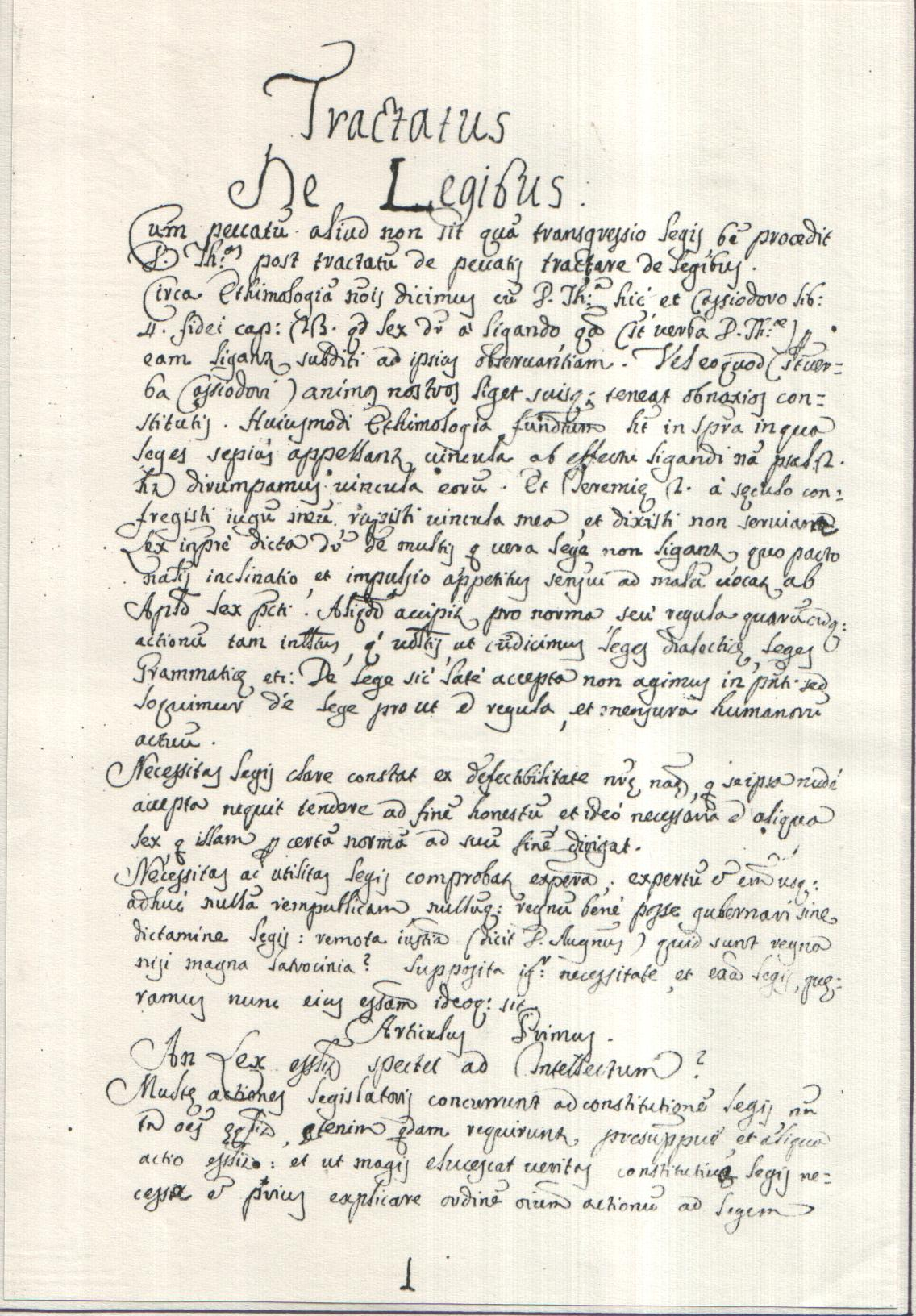
Hagius' De Legibus (1719)

15th century

- Peter Caxaro (c. 1400–1485)

17th century

- Maximilian Balzan (1637–1711)
- John Matthew Rispoli (1582–1639)
- Dominic Borg (birthdate unknown)
- Saverius Pace (birthdate unknown)

18th century

- George Sagnani (1667-1732)
- Constance Vella (1687–1759)
- John Constance Parnis (1695–1735)
- Joseph Demarco (1723–1789)
- Saviour Bernard (1724–1806)
- John Nicholas Muscat (1735–c. 1800)
- Dominic Bezzina (born c. mid-18th century)
- Fortunatus Victor Costa (birthdate unknown)
- Gaetanus Matthew Perez (birthdate unknown)
- Henry Regnand (birthdate unknown)

19th century

- Michael Anthony Vassalli (1764–1829)
- Jerome Inglott (1776–1835)
- Nicholas Zammit (1815–1899)
- Aloisio Galea (1851-1905)

20th century

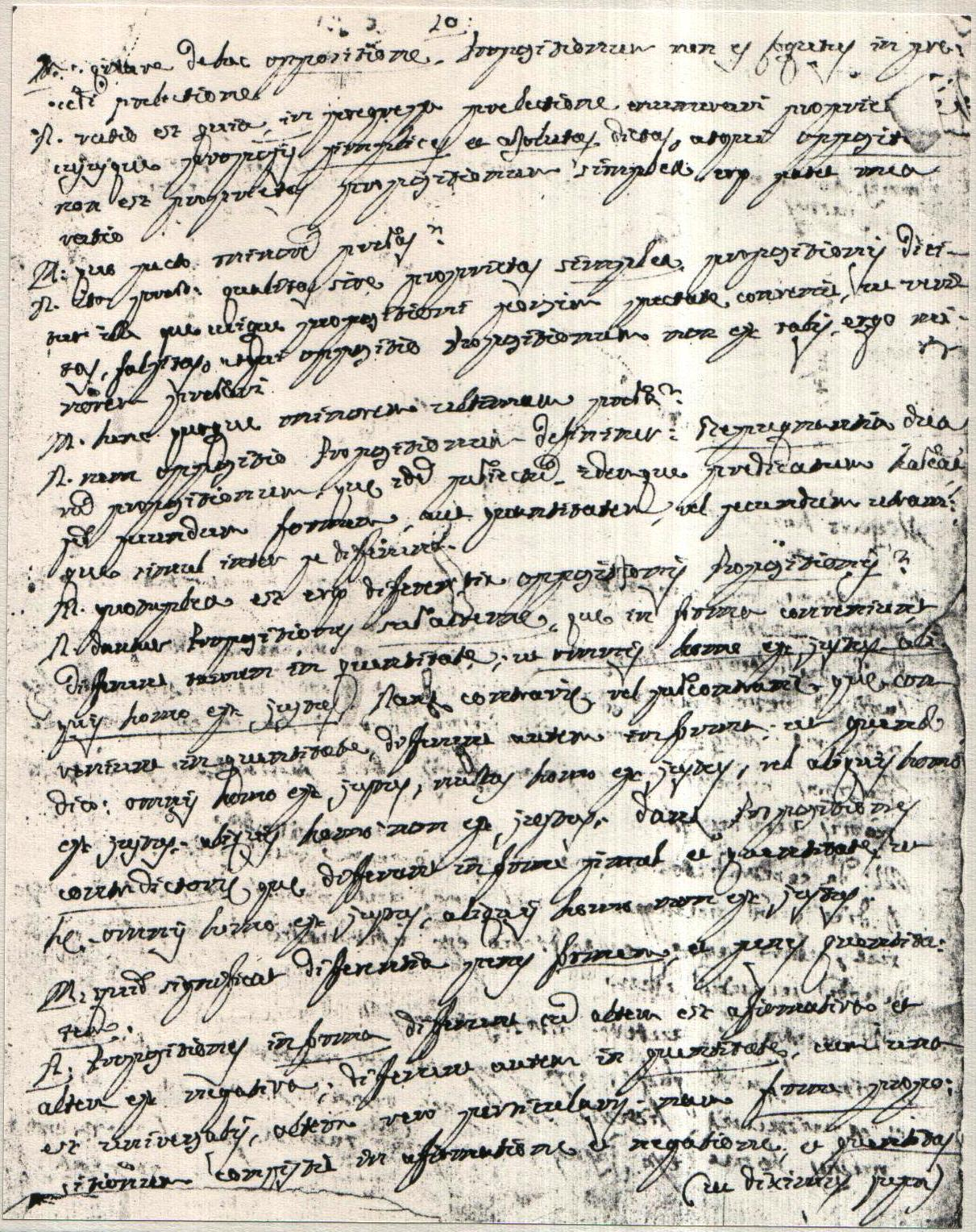
A page from one of Demarco's manuscripts

- Peter Paul Borg (1843-1934)
- Manuel Dimech (1860–1921)
- John Formosa (1869-1941)
- Anastasio Cuschieri (1872–1962)
- Albert Busuttil (1891-1956)
- Angelo Pirotta (1894–1956)
- Nazzareno Camilleri (1906–1973)
- John Micallef (1923–2003)
- Edward De Bono (b. 1933-2021)
- Peter Serracino Inglott (1936–2012)
- Kenneth Wain (b. 1943)
- Joe Friggieri (b. 1946)
- Oliver Friggieri (1947–2020)
- Tarcisio Zarb (b. 1952)
- Sandra Dingli (b. 1952)
- Mario Vella (b. 1953)
- John Peter Portelli (b. 1954)
- Emmanuel Agius (b. 1954)
- Anthony Abela (1954–2006)
- Michael Zammit (b. 1954)
- Joseph Giordmaina (b. 1963)
- John Baldacchino (b. 1964)
- Mark Montebello (b. 1964)
- Nicky Doublet (1968-2002)
- Colette Sciberras (b. 1976)

== Main sources ==
- J. Friggieri, ‘Philosophy today’, The Malta Year Book 1977, ed. by H.A. Clews, De La Salle Brothers Publications, Malta 1977, pp. 465–470.
- P. Serracino Inglott and C. Mangion, 'Il-Filosofija f'Malta' (Philosophy in Malta), Oqsma tal-Kultura Maltija (Areas of Maltese Culture), ed. by T. Cortis, Ministry of Education and the Interior, Malta 1991, pp. 263–271.
- M. Montebello, Il-Ktieb tal-Filosofija f’Malta (A Source Book of Philosophy in Malta), two volumes, PIN Publications, Malta 2001.
- J. Friggieri, ‘Letter from Malta’, The Philosophers’ Magazine, 55, 4th quarter, England 2011, pp. 48–51.
- M. Montebello, Malta's Philosophy & Philosophers, PIN Publications, Malta 2011.
