= Kenneth Wain =

Maltese philosopher and educator

- Born: 1943 (age 82–83); Sliema, Malta
- Education: University of London
- Occupations: Philosophy, Education

Kenneth Wain (born 1943) is a major Maltese philosopher and educator. His areas of specialisation in philosophy are chiefly education, ethics, political philosophy.

== Life ==
=== Beginnings ===
Wain was born at Sliema, Malta, in 1943. He then pursued his higher studies in philosophy and in education at the University of London, England. He later studied philosophy in Malta.

=== Career ===
After some teaching experience in multiple junior high schools in Malta, Wain started his long teaching career at the University of Malta. Here he was also appointed Dean of the Faculty of Education. Along the way, Wain continued to specialise in ethics, political philosophy, the philosophy of education, and international relations.

Apart from playing a leading role in Malta’s national educational policy development, and in the setting of the national curriculum, he continued to contribute actively in the field as chairman of the Foundation for Tomorrow's Schools, and of the Foundation for Educational Services. Wain is also a board member of the International Network of Philosophers of Education. In 2007, Wain was appointed Commissioner for Voluntary Organisations.

Throughout his academic and philosophical career, Wain published considerably, and also established himself as a public figure of liberal views with a ready, sharp, but always civil, tongue.

== Works ==
The following are some of Wain's publications.

The list might need updating. Please help with the ongoing process of updating.

=== Books ===
- Lifelong Education and Participation (ed.; 1984)
- Philosophy of Lifelong Education (1987)
- The Maltese National Minimum Curriculum (1990)
- Theories of Teaching (1992)
- Luciano Micallef (1993)
- Research into Secondary School Curricula (with Paul Heywood u James Calleja; 1994)
- The Value Crisis (1995)
- Tomorrow’s Schools (with Ronald Sultana, Mary Darmanin and others; 1995)
- Raymond Pitre: a study (with Raymond Pitre; 2000)
- The Learning Society in a Postmodern World (2004)

=== Articles ===
The list certainly needs updating. Please help with the ongoing process of updating.

==== Published abroad ====
- Lifelong Education—a Deweyian Challenge (1984)
- Lifelong education and philosophy of education (1985)
- Il-Vjolenza fl-Idejologija Politika (Violence in Political Ideology; 1987)
- The Case of Lifelong Learning: A Reply to Rozycki (1989)
- Lifelong Education: A Duty to Oneself? (1991)
- Evaluating History and Social Studies Textbooks (1992)
- Malta (with Peter Mayo; 1992)
- Human Rights, Political Education and Democratic Values (1992)
- Lifelong education and adult education — the state of the theory (1993)
- Lifelong Education: Illiberal and Repressive? (1993)
- Strong Poets and Utopia: Rorty's Liberalism, Dewey and Democracy (1993)
- A Postmodernist John Dewey? (1994)
- Competing Conceptions of the Educated Public (1994)
- Richard Rorty, Education, and Politics (1995)
- MacIntyre and the Idea of an Educated Public (1995)
- Foucault, Education, Self and Modernity (1996)
- Thinking Again (1999)
- The learning society: postmodern politics (2000)
- Lifelong Learning: Small Adjustment or Paradigm Shift? (2001)
- Richard Rorty and the end of Philosophy of Education (2002)
- Contribution (2002)
- Postmodernism/Post-structuralism (with Michael Peters; 2002)
- MacIntyre: Teaching, Politics and Practice (2003)
- This Thing Called 'The Philosophy of Education (2006)
- Foucault: The Ethics of Self-Creation and the Future of Education (2007)
- Lifelong Learning and the Politics of the Learning Society (2007)
- Rejoinder (2008)

==== Published in Malta ====
- Richard Saliba – Pitturi (1980)
- Opening Address (1988)
- Esprit Barthet (1991)
- Frank Portelli (1991)
- Creating a Philosophy of Lifelong Education (1992)
- Educational Research Workshop (1992)
- Creative Thinking (1993)
- Creative Thinking: Context and Curriculum (1994)
- Secondary Education and Research in Malta (1994)
- Il-Ġenituri, l-Edukazzjoni u l-Iskejjel (Parents, Education and Schools; 1994)
- Konservatiżmu u Ċentralizzazzjoni fl-Edukazzjoni f’Epoka ta’ Tibdil Mgħaġġel (Educational Conservatism and Centralisation in an Age of Rapid Change; 1995)
- Introduction (1996)
- Foreword (1996)

=== Poetry ===
A number of Wain's poetry appeared in various anthologies, including the following:

- Malta: The new poetry (co-authored; 1971)
- limestone 84, ed. by Daniel Massa (1978)

== Appreciation ==
Being an educationist with a pronounced bend towards the western model of democracy, Wain's early philosophy was very much influenced by John Dewey. His later philosophy also draws on the works of philosophers such as Michel Foucault, Jürgen Habermas and Richard Rorty.

This can be especially gauged from Wain's interest in the concept of lifelong learning, which, he maintains, should not be infected with any mania for efficient productivity in relation to political ideology, but, on the contrary, should be imbued with a broad humanistic awareness. This corroborates Wain's understanding of democracy, which, to him, has more to do with individual maturity and responsibility and less with State hegemony or political performance. According to Wain, education and democracy are handmaids of each other. His political, moral, and aesthetic, philosophies, to be sure, all stem from, and are based on, this foundation.

== Sources ==
- Mark Montebello, Il-Ktieb tal-Filosofija f’Malta (A Source Book of Philosophy in Malta), PIN Publications, Malta, 2001.

== See also ==
- Philosophy in Malta
