= Joseph Sapiano =

Maltese Catholic priest and philosopher (1911–1985)

- Born: 1911; Balzan, Malta
- Died: 1985 (aged 73–74); Malta
- Occupation: Philosophy

Joseph Sapiano (1911–1985) was a Maltese Catholic theologian and philosopher. In philosophy he was mostly interested in epistemology. He held the Chair of Philosophy at the University of Malta between 1953 and 1971.

== Life ==
Sapiano was born at Balzan, Malta, in 1911. He began his studies at the Lyceum, where he showed special interest in literature, and was also awarded prices for it. Afterwards, he pursued his studies at the Gregorian University in Rome (1928–39). He was ordained a priest in 1934. At Rome he obtained a doctorate in philosophy, another in theology, and a licentiate in Church history.

Back in Malta in 1944, Sapiano was appointed Professor of Patrology and Liturgy at the University of Malta. In 1950, for the next year and a half, he held the Chair of Philosophy at the same university on a pro tem basis. After becoming, in 1951, a Professor of Philosophy he continued some studies for another year and a half, and then, in 1953, he was finally appointed to the Chair of Philosophy, an office he kept for the next twenty years, up till 1971. Here, of course, he had a full complement of courses. Simultaneously, between 1944 and 1952, he also taught dogmatics, patrology, and liturgy at the bishop’s major seminary, and Latin at the minor seminary. Furthermore, he was theologian of the Metropolitan Chapter (1952), and prosynodal examiner and judge at the bishop’s curia. He died in 1985.

== Works ==
Sapiano was an Aristotelico-Thomist Scholastic. All his writings bear witness to such a philosophical character.

Though his academic and intellectual career spans over many decades, his philosophical publications are sporadic. He published some articles in Maltese periodicals such as Melita Theologica, Seminarium Melitense, and Scientia, but they are not of much significance. More interesting than these are his unpublished manuscripts containing his class notes. Although none of them are dated, they presumably go back to around 1951. All manuscripts are typed, and, but the final two listed below, are in Latin, as philosophy was taught at the University of Malta up till Sapiano’s time. The manuscripts deal with the following subjects:

- Logica Maior ("Principal Logic").
- Metaphysica ("Metaphysics").
- Psychologia ("Psychology").
- Cosmologia ("Cosmology").
- Theologia Naturalis ("Natural Theology or Theodicy").
- General Psychology.
- History of Ancient Greek Philosophy.

== See also ==
- Philosophy in Malta
