= Maximilian Balzan =

- Born: 1637; Malta
- Died: 1711 (aged 73–74); Malta
- Occupation: Philosophy

Maximilian Balzan (1637–1711) was a minor Maltese mediaeval philosopher who specialised mainly in physics and art. He was also an accomplished theologian. He had a very successful administrative career, both in the civil as well as the ecclesiastical sphere, and he further gave a significant share in academic circles.

== Life ==
Unfortunately, it is still not known where Balzan was born in Malta. He must have married young, though details of this marriage are yet historically unidentified. It is only known that he had at least one son, John Baptist Balzan, who later became a diocesan priest.

Balzan’s initial higher studies were almost certainly undertaken in view of his future service to the Order of Knights Hospitallers. He studied theology, and canon and civil law. He thus became a lawyer, then judge, and later an uditore (a sort of minister) to the Order of Knights Hospitallers. He served under four Grand Masters: Nicolas Cotoner, Gregorio Carafa (1680–90), Adrien de Wignacourt (1690–97), and Ramon Perellos y Roccaful.

Appointed ambassador to the German Emperor, Leopold I, Balzan accomplished his duties so well that he was appointed a knight of the Holy Roman Empire. During Gregorio Carafa’s watch, he was instrumental in drawing up a new code of penal law.

When his wife died, Balzan became a priest. Thus, he was made Commendatory of the Jerusalemite clergy of the Order of Knights Hospitallers, and advanced to being appointed a deacon at the Bishop’s Cathedral at Mdina, Malta. It was during this period that Balzan gave his full contribution to teaching philosophy at the Cathedral studium. This was around 1699.

When Balzan died (1711), he was buried in St. John’s Co-Cathedral, Valletta, Malta. The inscription over his tomb was composed by his son John Baptist, who by that time was, like his father, Commendatory of the Jerusalemite clergy of the Order of Knights Hospitallers.

== Known work ==
Only one work of Balzan seems to have survived. It is in Latin, and bears the following title:

- 1699 - Tractatus Physicæ (A Study of Physics). The manuscript is held at the Dominican Archives at Rabat, Malta, marked as MS. A106. Its sub-title is In Universam Hippocratis et Aristotelis Physicam (A Study of the Physics of Hippocrates and of Aristotle). No other works of Balzan are known to have existed accept this. Unfortunately, the manuscript has never been transliterated, much less translated into any modern language, or even freshly read and studied. This is indeed a pity. For, as can be gauged from details given below, Balzan seems to be a mind worthy of serious consideration. His manuscript is made up of 135 back to back folios, and full of interesting surprises.

=== The transcribers and custodian ===
The manuscript itself was not inscribed by Balzan but by two of his students, both clerics. They were John Francis Zammit and Dominic Zammit, who of course attended Balzan’s lectures and took down his teachings word for word. The transcription might have been endorsed by Balzan himself. Whatever the case, the document was conserved to posterity by Balzan’s own son, John Baptist, who later must have made a donation of it to the Dominicans at Rabat, Malta.

=== Contents and originality ===
Balzan’s manuscript is an interesting piece of scholarship. In a way its content might also be considered quite original. For instance, the fact that Balzan took into consideration ancient medical theories, such as those by Hippocrates, is indeed out of line with mainstream Scholastic treatises. However, there is even more to Balzan’s mind. He investigates subject matters which no Scholastic generally would. All of this seems to indicate that Balzan was not content to repeat, mechanically, the method and doctrines of Scholastic academics. Though the style of Balzan’s work is basically Scholastic in nature and methodology, however he frequently leaves the beaten track and roams, almost freely, into uncommon spheres of thought.

The work is composed of an introduction and (in the Scholastic style) three ‘Questions’. All of these four sections are further divided into ‘Disputations’. In the introduction, Balzan explains the principles of physics (Disputation 1), and the principles of matter (Disp. 2). The first part (Question I) deals with metaphysics. It has an introduction on the nature of metaphysics, and two further sections (also called ‘Questions’, though they are clearly ‘Disputations’) dealing with two minor aspects of metaphysics. The second part of Balzan’s work (Question II) explores nature and art, which in itself is quite exceptional for any Scholastic. In Dispute I, he examines the relationship between nature and art; in Dispute II, the natural causes in general; and in Dispute III, the four Aristotelian causes in particular. The third part of the work (Question III) goes into the concepts of movement and rest. Balzan assigns to this subject the lion’s share of his manuscript. After a short introduction, he examines the concept of the infinite (Disputation 1); two qualities of movement: space (Disp. 2) and time (Disp. 3); the concept of a continuum (Disp. 4); the skies and the earth (Disp. 5); and the nature of the heavens (Disp. 6).

== See also ==
- Philosophy in Malta
