= Joseph Xerri =

Maltese theologian and minor philosopher

- Born: Malta
- Occupation: Philosophy

Joseph Xerri (18th century) was a Maltese theologian and minor philosopher. Almost nothing is known about the personal life of Xerri. He might have been a priest. In 1773, Xerri was appointed to the Chair of Philosophy at the University of Malta, the second since its establishment two years earlier, in 1771, by the Grand Master of the Knights Hospitaller, Manuel Pinto da Fonseca. However, Xerri was unfortunate enough to be in office when in that same year the Grand Master of the Knights Hospitaller, Francisco Ximénez de Tejada, brought the activities of the university to a complete stop due to presumed overspending and restrictions in budgetary resources. Xerri was thus made redundant. Five years later, in 1778, when the activities of the university were resumed, and the Chair of Philosophy restored, Xerri was not appointed again. No writings of his, philosophical or otherwise, are known to exist. The same goes for any portrait of him.

== Sources ==
- Mark Montebello, Il-Ktieb tal-Filosofija f’Malta (A Source Book of Philosophy in Malta), PIN Publications, Malta, 2001.

== See also ==
- Philosophy in Malta
