= Aloisio Galea =

Maltese theologian and philosopher (1851–1905)

- Born: 1851; Valletta, Malta
- Died: 1905 (aged 53–54)
- Occupation: Philosopher

Aloisio Galea (1851–1905) was a Maltese theologian and philosopher. He specialised mostly in moral philosophy.

== Life ==
Galea was born in Valletta in 1851. He studied at the bishop’s seminary and at the University of Malta. He was ordained a priest in 1874. His main intellectual endeavour was to study, elaborate upon and teach Thomistic writings and doctrines, of which he was an expert. Specifically, he applied his studies to his pastoral work, particularly by focusing on Aquinas’ moral philosophy. Galea died in 1905.

== Works ==
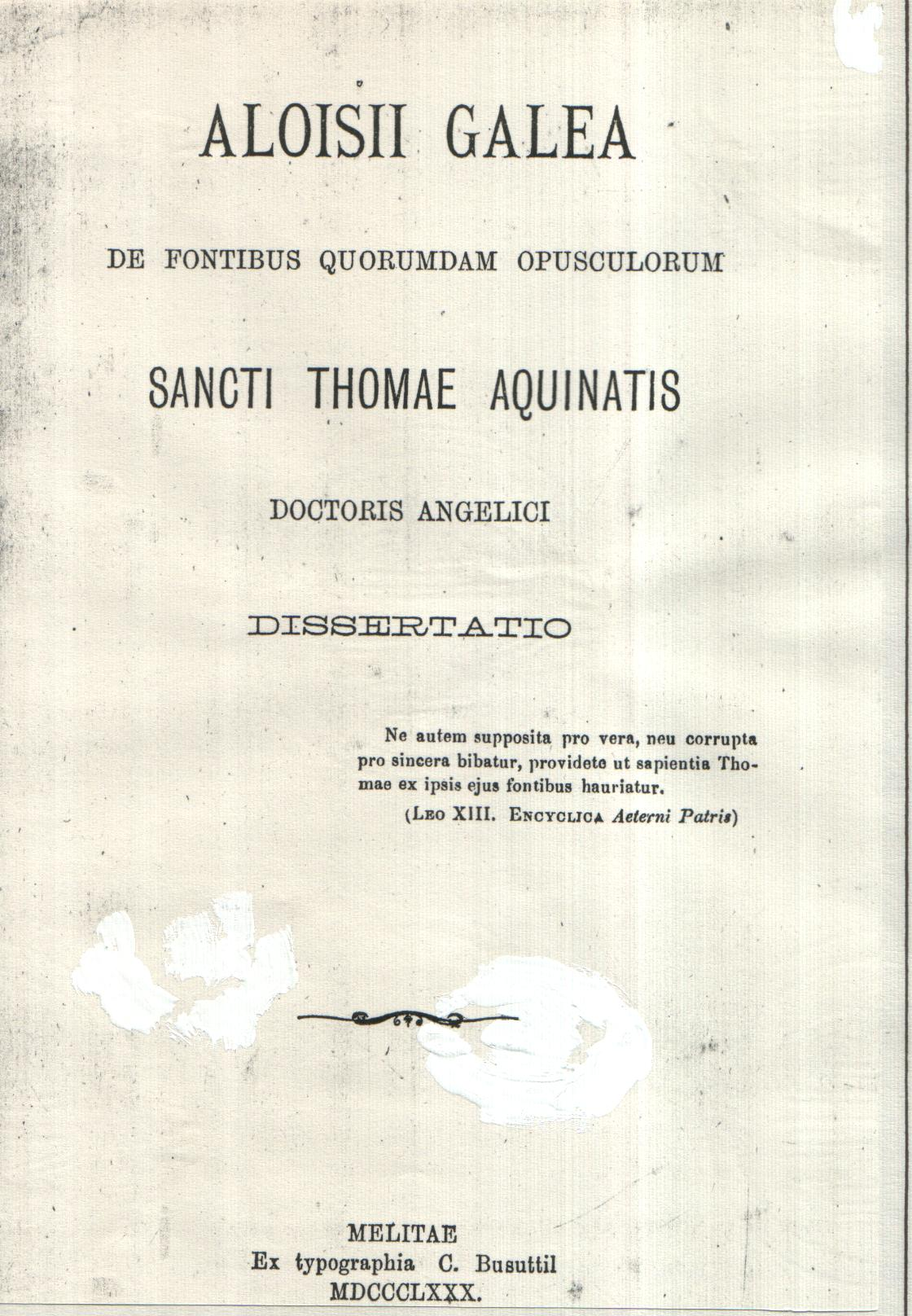
Aloisio Galea's 1880 De Fontibus

Though Galea wrote profusely, most of his publications are of a religious and devotional nature which do are of no interest to philosophy. However, some writings stand out for their philosophical acumen, amongst which are the following.

- 1879 – Dichiarazione delle Prime Ventisei Questioni della Summa Theologica (A Declaration concerning the First Twenty-Six Questions of Aquinas’ Summa Theologica). This book is as yet lost or misplaced. Pace states (as part of its title-page) that he reproduces ‘word for word’ Aquinas’ Questions. What this means is not exactly clear. It is unlikely that the publication is a reproduction of a part of Aquinas’ Summa without any comment whatsoever.
- 1880 – De Fontibus Quorundam Opusculorum Sancti Thomæ Aquinatis (Some Sources of the Writings of Saint Thomas Aquinas). A 65-page book in Latin (published in Malta by Tipografia C. Busuttil) which discusses in six chapters some of the fundamental principles which Aquinas upholds in his writings. Pace deals successively with the difference between the word of God and the word of humans, sensibility in relation to individuality, the intellect in relation to universals, natural light and divine light, the subject of thinking and the object of thought, being's reason for existence, and the composite nature of natural elements.
- 1882 – Articles published in the Italian review Divus Thomas. Discuss works attributed to Aquinas which Pace considered to be spurious.
- 1885-1900 – Tractatus de Trinitate Summæ Theologicæ Sancti Thomæ Aquinatis (A Study on the Trinity according to the Summa Theologica of Saint Thomas Aquinas). This work is still in manuscript form, and bears an additional title, namely: Aliarum septemdecim Quæstionum (And of Seventeen More Questions). It contains some 492 folios, and is divided in questions and articles as in the style of Scholasticism. The work rests heavily on Pope Leo XIII’s Æterni patris of 1879. It basically offers a philosophical discussion on the doctrine of the Trinity or, alternatively, on the nature of God.
- 1892 – Della Distinzione Numerica dei Peccati (On the Numeric Distinction of Sins). A 50-page book in Italian published in Malta (at Tipografia C. Busuttil, 133 Strada Forni, Valletta) in which Pace reflects on the first half of the second part of Aquinas’ Summa Theologica. Though the theme of this book seems irrelevant today, in Pace's time it still carried considerable practical weight. In this work, while citing long extracts in Latin (without an Italian translation), Pace proposes varies philosophical arguments to support his views.
- 1894 – De Caritate sive De Dilectione Dei (On Charity or On the Love of God). A 76-page book in Italian published in Sicily (Augustæ Taurinorum, ex officina salesiana) divided into two main parts, each of which have an introduction and a conclusion. The parts are further divided into eight and six sections respectively. Pace mainly deals with the theological virtue of love both from a theological as well as a philosophical standpoint. Practically, Pace follows the procedure adopted by Aquinas. Of course, Aquinas is the main source of the composition.

== Recognition ==
Galea's Caritate and Tractatus brought him considerable fame amongst orthodox Thomists, considering them a worth addition to their already gargantuan mass of literature supporting the doctrines of Aquinas. This contribution was duly recognised in 1957 by Gundisalvus Grech, who published a 23-page pamphlet in English (Progress Press, Valletta, Malta, under the title Don Luigi Galea: A distinguished Maltese scholar. The pamphlet gives a biography of Galea, and a review of all his writings. It also acknowledges Galea's contributions as a theologian and historian.

== See also ==
- Philosophy in Malta

== Sources ==
- Mark Montebello, Il-Ktieb tal-Filosofija f’Malta (A Source Book of Philosophy in Malta), PIN Publications, Malta, 2001.
