= Michael Zammit =

20th century Maltese philosopher

- Born: 1954; Valletta, Malta
- Occupation: Philosophy

Michael Zammit (born 1954) is a Maltese philosopher, specialised in Ancient and Eastern philosophy.

== Life ==
Zammit was born at Valletta in 1954. He studied Philosophy at the University of Malta, acquiring a Bachelor of Philosophy in 1976, and a Master's degree in 1993. After teaching at various academic centres in and around Malta, in 1983 he began teaching Philosophy at High School level. He joined the academic staff at the University of Malta in 1988 as part of a team preparing for the introduction of a general knowledge introductory course for High Schools called "Systems of Knowledge", and also for the introduction of an advanced level matriculation exam in philosophy. At the time, he was also active at the School of Practical Philosophy in Valletta.

Zammit began teaching Philosophy, Logic, and Aesthetics (including Calligraphy at the University of Malta in 1992. That same year he was appointed Academic Coordinator of the Centre for Basic Studies at the same university. Between 1989 and 1995, he coordinated, administered and lectured "Systems of Knowledge" courses in both Malta and Gozo. In 1989, he founded the "Philosophy Society" within the Department of Philosophy at the University of Malta. At this university, Zammit lectured on Ancient Philosophy (1992), and Eastern and Western Comparative Philosophy (1994). In 1995, he began teaching Introduction to Philosophy, and other subjects related to Philosophy. On the radio station of the University of Malta (Campus FM), Zammit produced and presented at least three series of programmes related to philosophy: Platun (Plato; 1996), Philosophy Help-line (1997), and Oht il-Gherf? (Sister of Knowledge?; 1998).

After some years detached from work directly associated with the University of Malta, lecturing at Malta's Junior College, in 2008 he became a Senior Lecturer in the Philosophy Department of the Faculties of Arts and that of Theology of the University of Malta. He teaches Plato, Plotinus, Marsilio Ficino, Far Eastern Philosophy and Sanskrit Advaita Vedanta Philosophy. His interests vary from the use of poetic expression in the exploration of philosophical themes to the grammatological analysis of the Paninean Sanskrit notions in the light of contemporary continental philosophical concerns.

== Works ==
Zammit's works include the following:

=== Books ===
- 1974 – Imma Hajt Azzari Ghalina, Malta.
- 1978 – Fil-Waqt li l-Qalb(h)a Thares (While Her Heart Watches/When She Watches Over Her Heart), Malta (translated into English by E. Eichmann, with a phonetic transcription by A. Borg and M. Alexander).
- 1990 – Man and Symbols, Guttenberg Press, Malta.
- 1995 – Systems of Knowledge (co-authored), Vol. I and II,.
- 1995 – L-Apologija (The Apology), translation, Malta University Press, Malta (2nd ed. 1997).
- 2004 – Mireddien fi Skiethom (Recitals In Stillness/Right Minded Recitals), AWL Publication, Malta (translated into Italian and published in Rome as Ombreggiature Silenziose, Editoria & Spettacolo, in 2007).
- 2006 – Ghana ’l Hena (Odes to Bliss), AWL Publication, Malta (2006).
- 2007 – Il Re Mantra: Ombreggiature Silenziose (The Mantra King: Silent Shadows), Editoria & Spettacolo, Rome.
- 2008 – Vyasa's Sanskrit Bhagavad Gita, translation.

=== Articles ===
- 1985 – 'On Inspiration', Hyphen, Vol. IV.
- 1990 – 'Notes for an Introduction to an Introduction to Logic', Man and Symbols, Guttenberg Press, Malta.
- 1989 – 'Paul Sant Cassia's "L-Ghana – Bejn il-Folklor u l-habi"' (Paul Sant Cassia's 'Folk Music – Between Folklore and Concealment), L-Identità Kulturali ta' Malta (Malta's Cultural Identity), Malta, translation, Department of Information, Malta.
- 1996 – 'He is You are What I am: from the Unique to the Universal', Asian Philosophy, Vol. VI, n. 2.
- 2006 – 'Manwel Dimech – Bniedem ta’ Spiritwalità' (Manuel Dimech: A man of spirituality), Knisja tat-Triq, ed. by Michael Grech, AWL Publication, Malta.

== Sources ==
- Mark Montebello, Il-Ktieb tal-Filosofija f’Malta (A Source Book of Philosophy in Malta), PIN, Malta, 2001.
- Mark Montebello, 20th Century Philosophy in Malta, Agius & Agius, Malta, 2006.
- Mark Montebello, Malta’s Philosophy & Philosophers, PIN, Malta, 2011.

== See also ==
Philosophy in Malta
