= Jerome Inglott =

Maltese philosopher and theologian

- Born: April 11, 1776; Senglea, Hospitaller Malta
- Died: July 29, 1835; Vittoriosa, Crown Colony of Malta
- Occupation: Philosophy

Jerome Inglott (1776–1835) was a Maltese philosopher and theologian. His areas of specialisation in philosophy were chiefly metaphysics and ontology. He held the Chair of Philosophy at the University of Malta (1822–27), and was one of the Philosopher-Rectors at the same university (1826–33).

== Life ==
Considering his official obligations at various high institutions, and his extant work, Inglott must have possessed a formidable mind. Unfortunately, however, it seems that he was almost completely taken up by administrative duties which left him little time to write his philosophical thoughts. This considerably weakened his influence both on his contemporaries as on his posteriors.

Inglott was born at Senglea, Malta, on April 11, 1776. He joined the Order of Preachers at Vittoriosa, Malta in 1796 at twenty years of age. After completing his institutional studies in philosophy and theology, he continued living at Vittoriosa, teaching theology and philosophy at its Studium. Here, at the age of forty-two, in 1818, he was appointed Master of Studies. At the same time he lectured on philosophy at the University of Malta. Here, between 1822 and 1827, Inglott held the Chair of Philosophy. Also during 1822, he was appointed Deputy-Rector at the University of Malta, and then, in 1826, Rector (until 1833).

In 1820, Inglott was chosen as Prior of the Dominicans at Vittoriosa. Later, while Rector, in 1826 Inglott was also chosen to head the Maltese Dominicans on behalf of the Sicilian Province. He retained this office until 1829.

While Prior at Vittoriosa Inglott was accused of squandering public funds during the restoration works which had been carried out at the priory following the explosion of Gunpowder Deposit in 1806. In 1820 restoration works had been still going on since the incident. During the next couple of years, Inglott had to defend himself against these accusations, and finally was acquitted.

During Inglott's tenure as deputy-rector at the University of Malta, the British colonial Governor of Malta, Thomas Maitland, affected some changes in the department of literature. As a result, some time later a general council was formed with Thomas Maitland himself as chancellor, John Hookham Frere as president, and Inglott as rector. It was this council which, in 1825, appointed Michael Anthony Vassalli as the first professor of the Maltese Language at the University of Malta (though paid by Hookham).

In 1833, Inglott resigned from rector due to ailing health. He remained an examiner of moral theology (1830), Prior of the Dominicans at Vittoriosa (1830), and, for the last year and a half of his life, professor of philosophy at the Studium Generale of the Dominicans at Vittoriosa (1833–35).

Inglott died at the Dominican priory of Vittoriosa on July 29, 1835. His funeral address was delivered by Joseph Bartolommeo Xerri.

== Works ==
Though Inglott's specialisation in philosophy had been metaphysics and ontology, no writings of his on these subjects are known to have existed or whether they were lost by time. Unfortunately, the archives where manuscripts were kept at the Dominican priory at Vittoriosa were hit by bombs during World War II. Inglott's only extant manuscript survived because it was held at the Dominican archives at Rabat, Malta, and not at Vittoriosa. If Inglott's other manuscripts existed at all, and no copies of them were made, they were probably destroyed during the war.

Inglott's only extant manuscript deals with logic. It is called Dialecticæ Elementa (Elements of Dialectic), and composed in 1823. The document, which is in Latin, is not in Inglott's handwriting. It was put to paper by one of his students, Gaetano Vassallo, and is made up of 174 folios.

The work is divided into four main parts. The first contains a series of introductions, the second deals with logic (under 13 main titles), the third deals with the rules of logical truth (3 main titles), and the fourth deals with some erroneous opinions concerning the method of logical judgement (4 main titles).

The introductory parts of the work contain a note of caution to young students regarding their studies, a short preface on philosophy (including a part explaining the division of the subject), and a foreword for the study of logic.

== Sources ==
- Mark Montebello, Il-Ktieb tal-Filosofija f’Malta (A Source Book of Philosophy in Malta), PIN Publications, Malta, 2001.
- Michael Fsadni, ‘The Dominicans’, Birgu – A Maltese maritime city, ed. by Lino Bugeja et al., Malta University Services Ltd., University of Malta, Malta, 1993, Vol. II, pp. 706–709.

== See also ==
- Philosophy in Malta
