= Fortunatus Victor Costa =

Maltese philosopher

- Born: Senglea, Malta
- Occupation: Philosophy

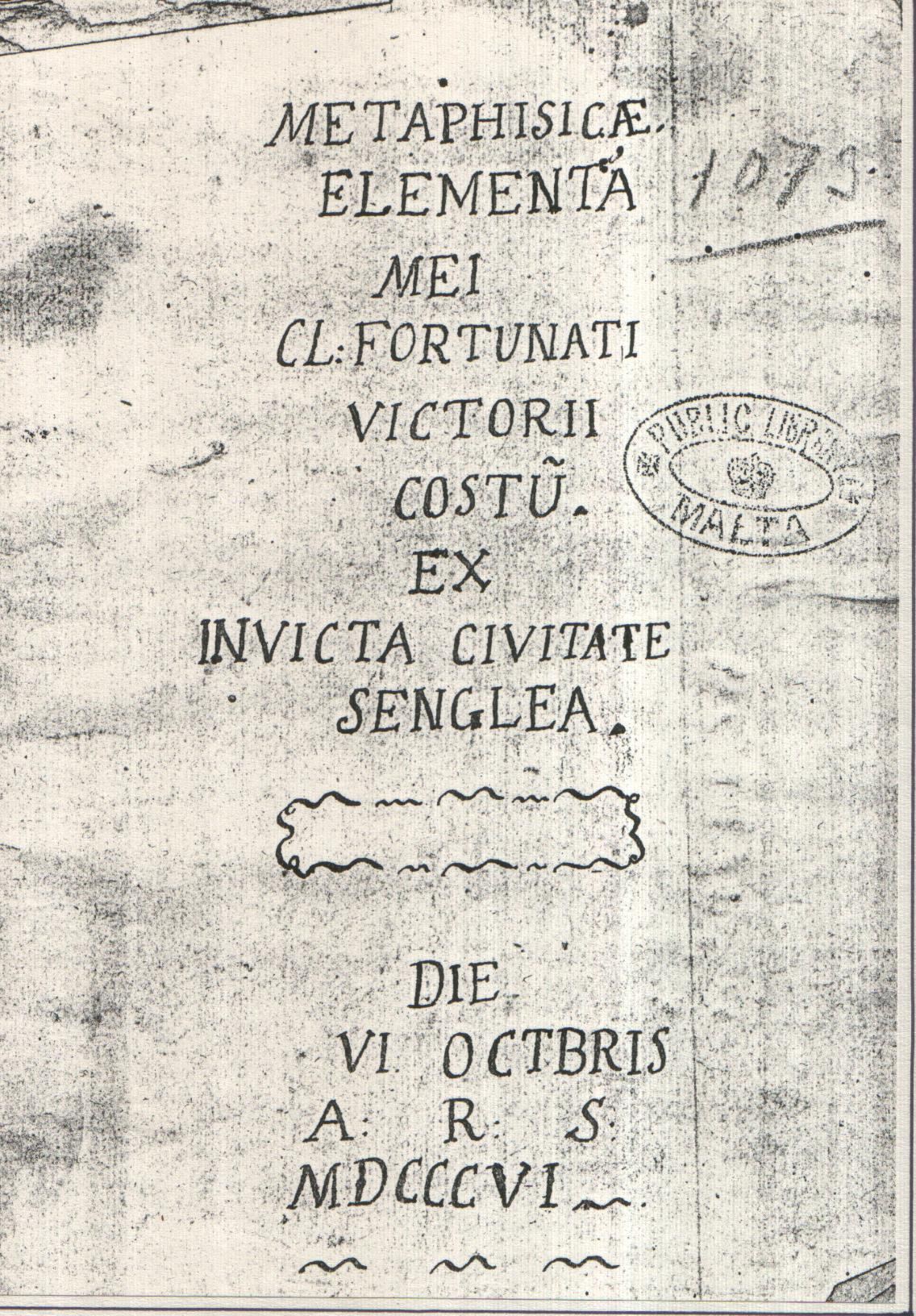
Metaphysicæ Elementa (1806) of Fortunatus Victor Costa

Fortunatus Victor Costa (18th/19th centuries) was a minor Maltese philosopher who specialised in metaphysics.

== Life ==
Almost nothing is known as yet about the personal life of Costa, only that he hailed from Senglea, Malta, and that in 1806 he was a religious cleric. He might have been studying for the priesthood or else embraced the clerical state on a lifelong basis.

== Extant work ==
Only one work of Costa survives: the Metaphysicæ Elementa (Metaphysical Matters), composed in 1806. It is still in manuscript form, and of course deals with metaphysics. The work is organised in the typical style of Scholasticism, that is, in parts and chapters as was then used in the schools.

The document is a type of traditional treatise on metaphysics. It is simple in style and unassuming in content.

== Sources ==
- Mark Montebello, Il-Ktieb tal-Filosofija f’Malta (A Source Book of Philosophy in Malta), PIN Publications, Malta, 2001.

== See also ==
- Philosophy in Malta
