= Saverius Pace =

Maltese philosopher

- Born: Unknown; Malta
- Died: Unknown
- Occupation: Philosophy of Nature

Saverius Pace (17th century) was a minor Maltese philosopher who specialised in physics.

== Life ==
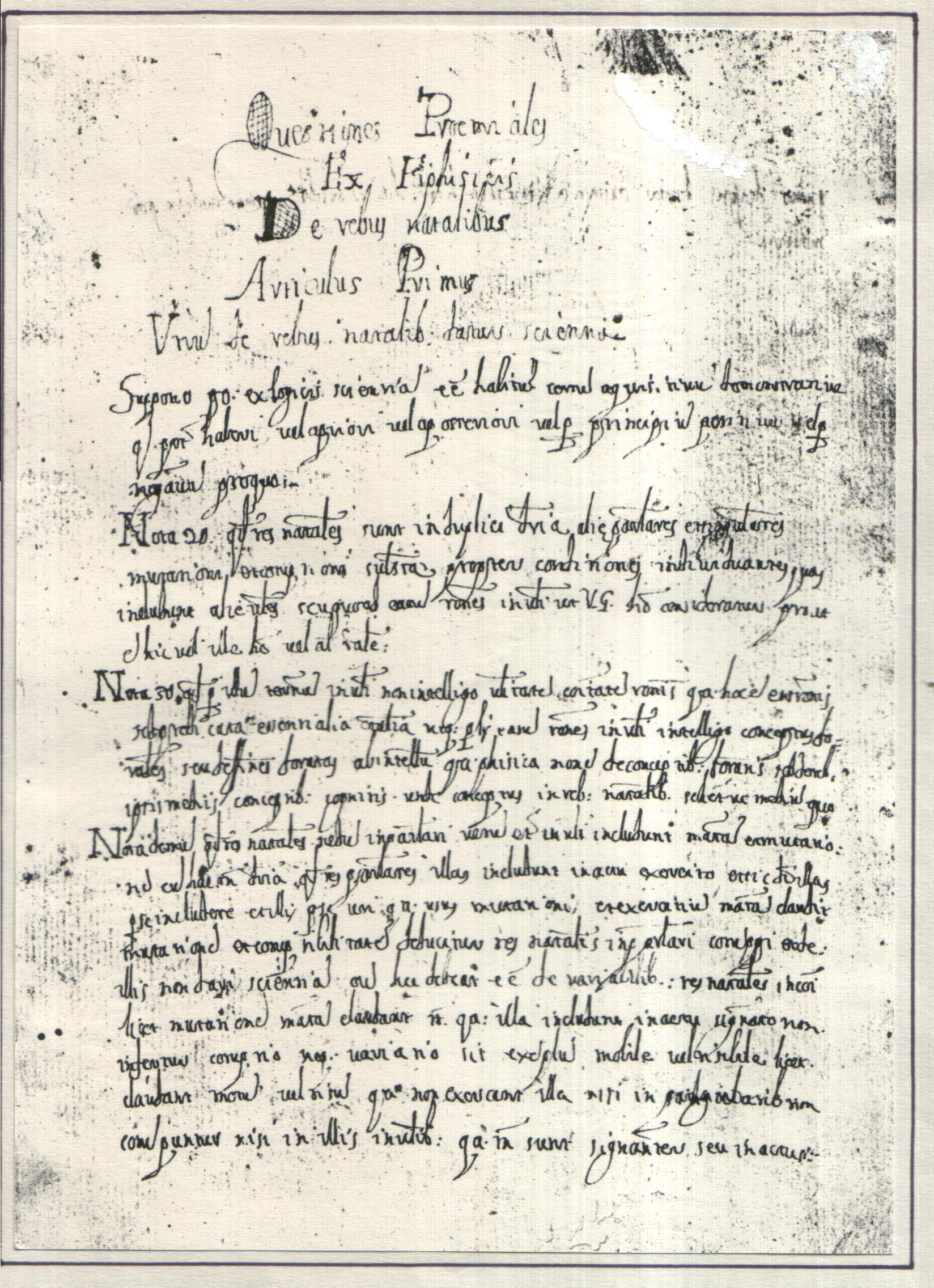
Saverius Pace's only extant work

Little is known about the private life of Saverius Pace. Neither his dates of birth and death nor his birthplace in Malta are identified as yet. He might have lectured at the Collegium Melitense see in Valletta. Only one work of Pace's has survived. No portrait of Pace is known to exist so far.

== Known works ==
Pace’s only work which is still extant is Elucidario in quatru libru Phisicoru Aristotelis (An Examination of the first four Books of Aristotle’s ‘Physics’), written in 1649 (begun in May of that year). The manuscript is written in old Italian or Sicilian, and held at the National Library of Malta, Valletta, marked as MS. 1465. Its pages are not numbered.

The work is a detailed philosophical examination of the first four out of the eight books of Aristotle’s Physics. Its division is typical of Scholasticism, and hence organised in Articles and Conclusions.

== See also ==
- Philosophy in Malta

== Sources ==
- Mark Montebello, Il-Ktieb tal-Filosofija f’Malta (A Source Book of Philosophy in Malta), PIN Publications, Malta, 2001.
