= John Formosa =

Maltese theologian, canonist, minor philosopher and poet

- Born: March 22, 1869; Cospicua, Malta
- Died: March 29, 1941; Malta
- Occupation: Philosophy

John Formosa (1869–1941) was a Maltese theologian, canonist, minor philosopher, and poet. In philosophy, he mostly specialised in metaphysics.

== Life ==
Formosa was born in Cospicua, Malta, on March 22, 1869. He studied at the University of Malta and at other universities abroad. These studies made him Doctor of Theology and Doctor of Canon Law. He was ordained a priest in 1893. He was also a Canon of the bishop’s Cathedral Chapter at Mdina. He died on March 29, 1941, at 72 years of age.

== Works ==
Though the writings and publications of Formosa are numerous, most of them are of no interest to philosophy since they are of a theological, devotional, or religious nature. Some speculative writings, however, have philosophical value, namely the following:

- 1913 – La Rivelazione e l’Uomo (Revelation and Man). A 20-page booklet in Italian published in Malta (Tipografia del ‘Malta Herald’) which reproduces a speech that Formosa delivered in the church of the University of Malta in Valletta at the commencement of the academic year 1913/14. The work discusses man’s nature from the point of views of his intellectual, ecstatic, and moral faculties. Formosa maintains that the objective of every school is the development and perfection of these faculties.
- 1917 – Trattato dei Fondamenti della Religione (A Study on the Foundations of Religion). An 876-page volume in Italian published in Malta (Tipografia Giovanni Muscat) in which Formosa maintains, on the one hand, that revelation is the foundation for the universality of the Catholic religion, and, on the other, that the Catholic Church, as a divine and human institution, encompasses all wisdom and every kind of art and science. This quantitively impressive publication is basically an apologetic composition. Formosa proffers many philosophical arguments to sustain his position.
- 1921 – Formazione del Carattere della Gioventù Studiosa (The Character Formation of Young Students). A 27-page book in Italian published in Malta (Tipografia ‘Empire Press’, Floriana) which reproduces a speech delivered by Formosa on January 21, 1921, at the aula magna of the University of Malta. It is dedicated to Pope Benedict XV. The nature of the work can be surmised from the book’s opening words: ‘In the sad times through which we pass, when socialist concepts – doctrines so dangerous and subversive – snake everywhere and create confusion in the intellectual and moral worlds as well as disorder amongst human societies ...’ Continuing in this style, Formosa basically upholds two major concepts: that God is the sufficient reason for the existence of all science, and that metaphysics is the first and ultimate science of man. Formosa provides philosophical arguments to sustain his theories.
- 1923 – San Tommaso d’Aquino: Sole di Verità e Oracolo della Theologia (Saint Thomas Aquinas: The Sun of Truth and the Excellence of Theology). A 14-page booklet in Italian published in Malta (Tipografia di Giovanni Muscat, Valletta) which reproduces a talk given by Formosa on November 16, 1923, at the aula magna of the University of Malta. The work is dedicated to theology students and is a laudatory composition for Thomas Aquinas.

== See also ==
- Philosophy in Malta

== Sources ==
- Mark Montebello, Il-Ktieb tal-Filosofija f’Malta (A Source Book of Philosophy in Malta), PIN Publications, Malta, 2001.
- Michael Schiavone, Dictionary of Maltese Biographies, Vol. I, PIN Publications, Malta, 2009.
