= Joseph Moncada =

- Born: Modica, Italy
- Occupation: Professor of Philosophy

Joseph Moncada (18th century) was a Dominican theologian, the first Professor of Philosophy at the University of Malta and Rector of the same university.

== Life ==
Moncada was born in Modica, Italy, and joined the Dominican Order. He was regent of studies at the Dominican college in Sicily. In Malta, he was close to the Grand Masters of the Knights Hospitaller, who engaged him in various offices.

Around 1750, Moncada was Professor of Theology at the Dominican college of Portus Salutis in Valletta, where he taught logic, metaphysics, and ethics. He taught the same subjects at the University of Malta. Here he had been teaching since 1768. Some time before, he might have been part of the Accademia dei Geniali of Modica, and also, in 1751, a coadjutor of the Confraternita di Santa Maria della Candelora of Sicily. It appears that in 1770 Moncada had left Malta, since in November of that year Grand Master Manuel Pinto da Fonseca wrote to the Master General of the Dominicans in Rome to request that Moncada be sent to Malta immediately to help him in the establishment of the University of Malta. Moncada returned to Malta in 1771, and was immediately appointed to the seat of Philosophy at the newly established university, an office Moncada kept until 1773.

In 1778, Grand Master Emmanuel de Rohan-Polduc made some reforms at the University of Malta which in effect amounted to a refoundation. Consequently, he chose and appointed Moncada as Rector. Notwithstanding, Moncada’s appointment did not come into effect until 1780. Moncada, however, acted as Rector immediately since the official Rector was confined to bed with gout.

During his time of tenure as rector, Moncada also held the Chair of Philosophy, first as the deputy of Dominic Malarbi (from October to December 1779), and then as Professor. Moncada remained Rector of the university and Professor of Philosophy up till 1786. While holding these offices, he continued with the reforms which had begun before him. Through his efforts, the University of Malta became an autonomous academic institution (1778), it acquired the power to administer its own property, and also to have a treasury independent from that of government.

== Extant work ==
It does not seem that any of Moncada's written works have survived.

== Sources ==
- V. Laurenza, ‘Il primo Rettore e i primi statuti dell’Università di Malta’ (The first Rector and the first statutes of the University of Malta), Malta 1934.
- A. Vella, ‘The University of S. Maria Portus Salutis’ (The University of St Mary of Portus Salutis [Valletta]), Journal of the Faculty of Arts, Vol. II, No. 2, 1962.
- A. Vella, ‘The origins and development of the Royal University of Malta’, Foundation Day Ceremony, 12 November 1965, University Press, Malta 1966.
- A. Vella, ‘L-Ordni tal-Predikaturi u l-Università ta’ Malta’ (The Order of Preachers and the University of Malta), Ir-Ruzarju, Malta, April–June 1949.
- M. Montebello, Il-Ktieb tal-Filosofija f’Malta (A Source Book of Philosophy in Malta), PIN Publications, Malta, 2001.

== See also ==
Philosophy in Malta
