= Gaetanus Matthew Perez =

Maltese philosopher

- Born: Malta
- Occupation: Philosophy

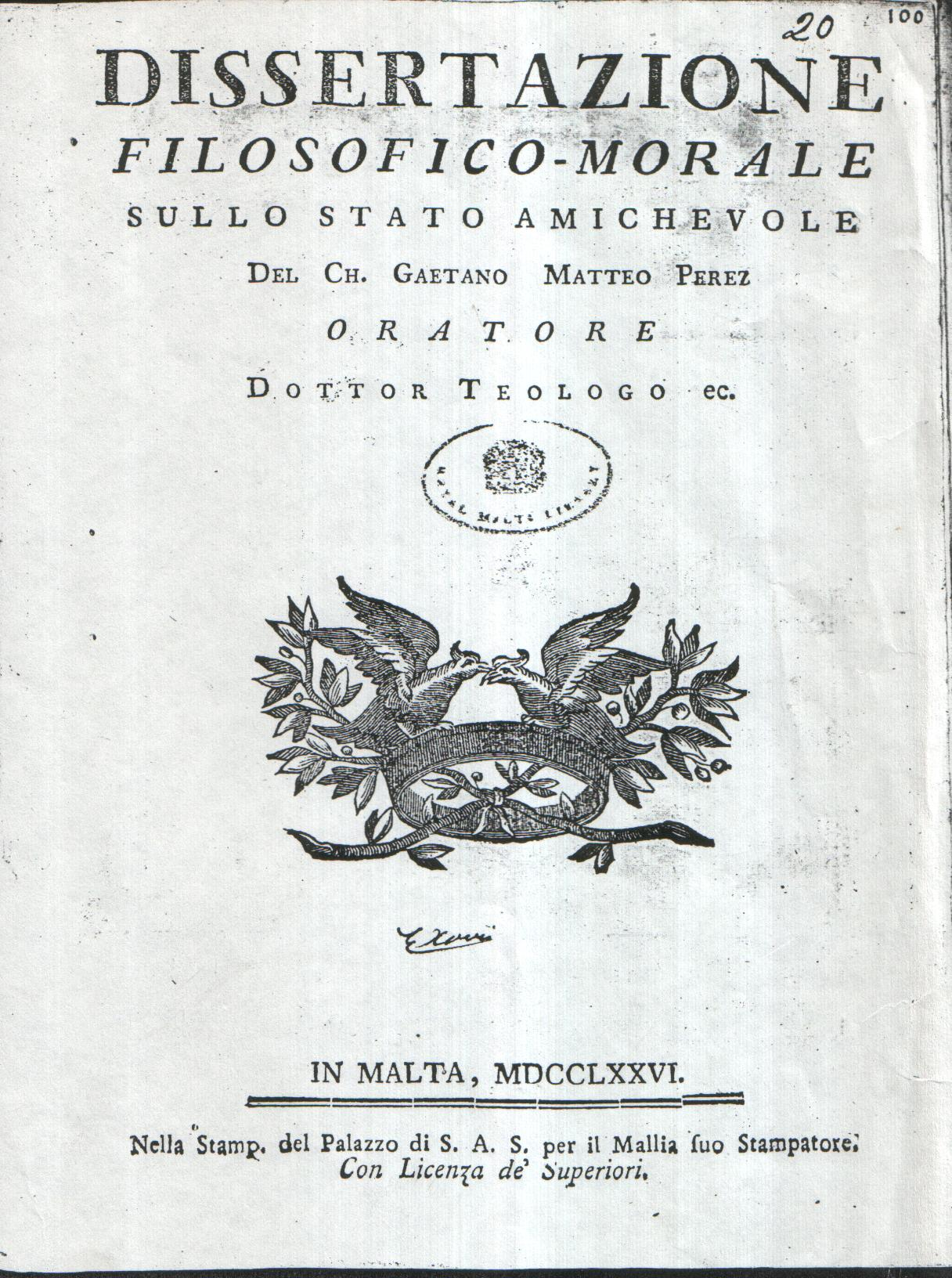
Dissertazione Filosofico-Morale sullo Stato Amichevole (1776) of Gaetanus Matthew Perez

Gaetanus Matthew Perez (18th century) was a minor Maltese philosopher. His area of specialisation in philosophy was chiefly ethics. No portrait of Perez is known to exist so far.

== Life ==
Absolutely nothing is yet known about Perez’ personal life.

== Work ==
Just one work, and a very interesting one at that, survives from Perez’ hand. It is a publication in Italian which bears the title: Dissertazione Filosofico-Morale sullo Stato Amichevole (A Philosophical-Moral Study on Friendship). The work, published in 1776 at the printing press of the Knights Hospitallers in Valletta, Malta, is made up of only twelve pages. Nevertheless, the content of the study is quite unusual for Perez’ time.

The booklet contains a long epistle addressed to Abbot Joseph Raiberti of Nissa, the Conventual Chaplain of the Knights Hospitallers. It deals with the value and need of friendship. The writing itself is one long piece of prose without any divisions whatsoever.

First Perez discusses friendship on the level of individuals. This relationship is then explored as a model and foundation of political and social life. Perez makes it quite clear that, to his mind, personal friendship is the essential condition from which peace, justice, and a nation’s progress begin, and on which they are based.

== Sources ==
- Mark Montebello, Il-Ktieb tal-Filosofija f’Malta (A Source Book of Philosophy in Malta), PIN Publications, Malta, 2001.

== See also ==
- Philosophy in Malta
