= Joe Friggieri =

Maltese philosopher

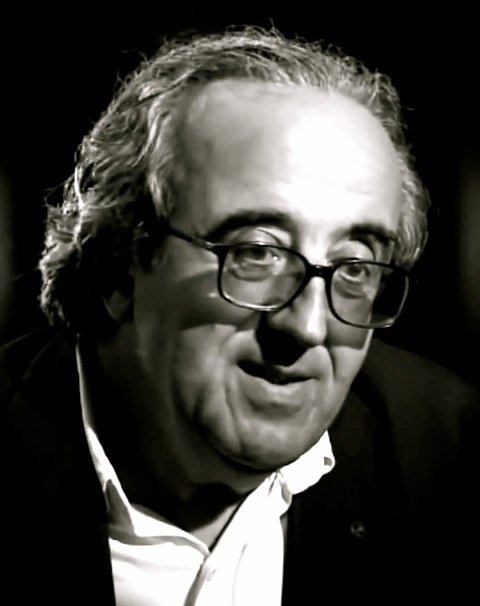
Joe Friggieri

Joe Friggieri (born 1946) is Professor of Philosophy at the University of Malta, poet, playwright and theatre director.

== Biography ==
Friggieri was the first professor of philosophy on the University of Malta faculty not to be a Catholic priest and succeeded Peter Serracino Inglott in 1996 upon the latter's retirement. He holds doctorates from the University of Milan (Cattolica) and The University of Oxford. Friggieri has been guest research scholar and lecturer at the Universities of Venice, Amsterdam, St Andrews, Augsburg and Genova. He is currently a professor at the University of Malta and previously was a member of the Senate of the same University.

Friggieri's publications include three volumes of poetry, three collections of short stories, a number of plays, as well as two volumes entitled In-Nisġa tal-Ħsieb, the first history of philosophy publications in Maltese. In-Nisġa tal-Ħsieb is also compulsory reading for philosophy students in Malta. He has won several literary awards, including the National Literary Prize five times (1993, 1999, 2003, 2008, 2013). One of his most popular works is L-Istejjer tar-Ronnie, published in 1994 by Klabb Kotba Maltin, which caricatures father of four ir-Ronnie, a Maltese middle-aged mechanic, in a series of short stories. The original publication was so popular that it was eventually turned into a teleserial.

In 2004 Friggieri unsuccessfully contested Malta's first elections for the European Parliament on behalf of the governing Nationalist Party, garnering a total of 5457 votes on first count.

== Selected bibliography ==
- L-Istejjer tar-Ronnie, Malta (1992);
- In-Nisga tal-Hsieb No. 1, Malta (2000);
- In-Nisga tal-Hsieb No. 2, Malta (2007);
- Aktar Stejjer tar-Ronnie, Malta (2010);

== See also ==
- Philosophy in Malta
