= Dominic Borg =

Maltese philosopher

- Born: Unknown; Malta
- Died: Unknown
- Occupation: Philosophy lecturer

Dominic Borg (17th century) was a minor Maltese philosopher who specialised in logic and rhetoric.

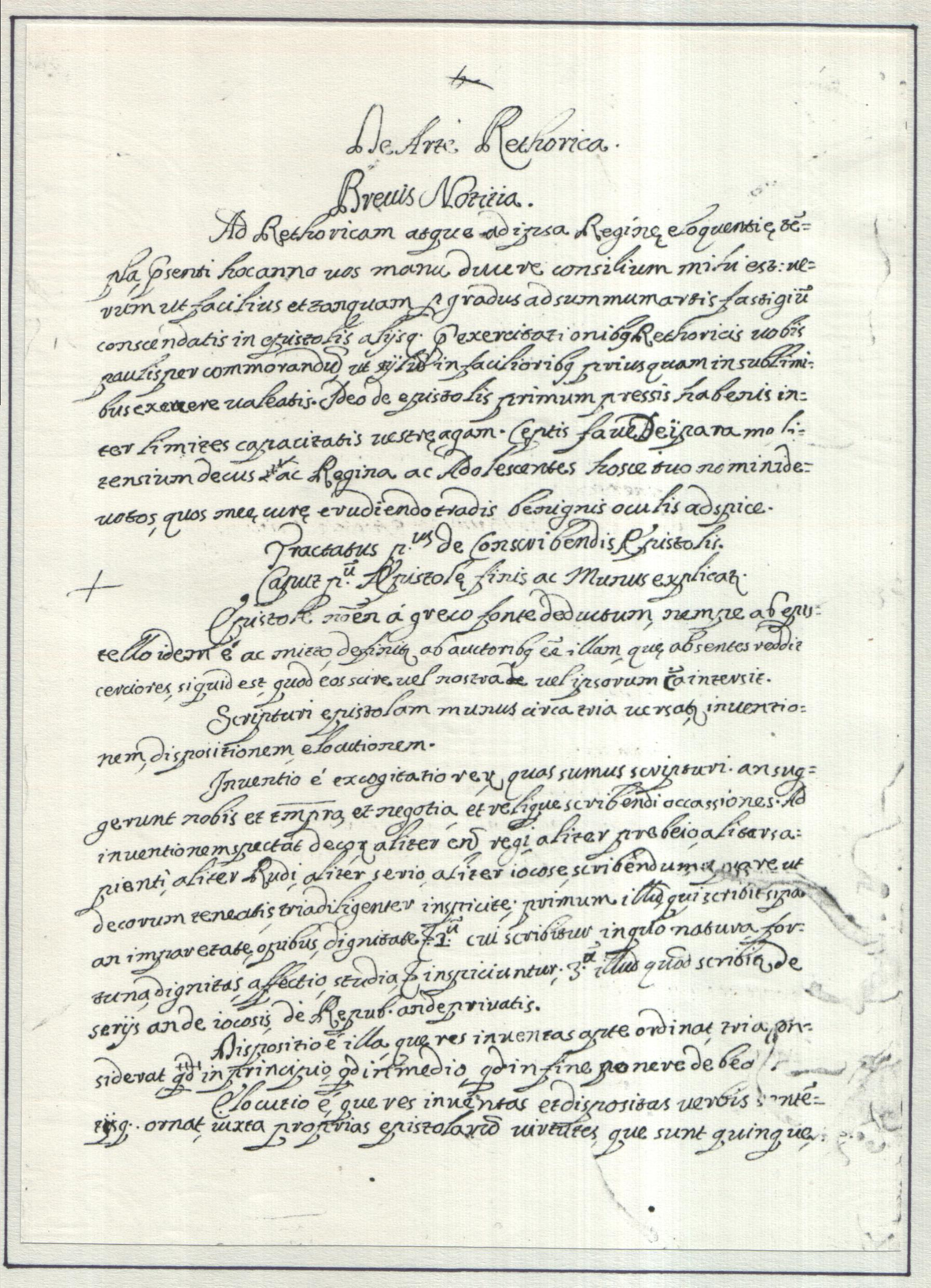
Frontispiece of Dominic Borg's De Arte Rhetorica

== Life ==
He probably lectured at the Collegium Melitense in Valletta. The extant works of Borg reveal practically nothing in terms of biographical data. What they do attest to is his philosophical prowess and his clarity of thought.

== Known works ==
Only three works of Dominic Borg are known to exist. Two on rhetoric and one on logic. Others might have been lost or are currently displaced.

=== Rhetoric ===
Borg’s De Arte Rethorica: Brevis Notitia (A Short Note on the Art of Rhetoric), a work in Latin completed in 1668, is held in manuscript form at the National Library of Malta as MS. 718#10. It is his most relevant extant work to date. The manuscript is made up of forty folios, and is compiled as part of a miscellaneous volume of works. Basically, Borg’s manuscript is a study of rhetoric, and is composed as a series of epistles. The first epistle is an investigation into the teachings of Aristotle. Throughout all of the epistles, Borg makes liberal use of Cicero.

Another extant work on rhetoric from Borg’s hand is Compendio Brevissimo delli piu inutili precetti per comporre epistola (A Very Short Collection on the Minute Rules for Writing Epistles), composed in 1668. This manuscript is also in Latin, and is held at the National Library of Malta as MS. 718#11). It contains only twelve folios, and is organised in chapters (some of which are divided into smaller parts). The work investigates the nature of epistles, and the proper manner with which epistles should be composed. The work is not particularly speculative. It is more of a short and technical exercise in rhetoric. Again, Cicero is quoted profusely.

=== Logic ===
Borg’s work on logic is called Brevis Introductio ad Logicam Artis (A Brief Introduction to the Art of Logic), composed in 1669. The manuscript is in Latin, and held at the National Library of Malta as MS. 718#2. This work is made up of just sixteen folios, and is actually a very simple piece of writing where Borg examines the various distinctions of logic. The composition is divided under various sub-titles.

== See also ==
Philosophy in Malta
