= Peter Paul Borg =

Maltese theologian and philosopher

- Born: 1843; Malta
- Died: 1934 (aged 90–91); Malta
- Occupation: Philosophy

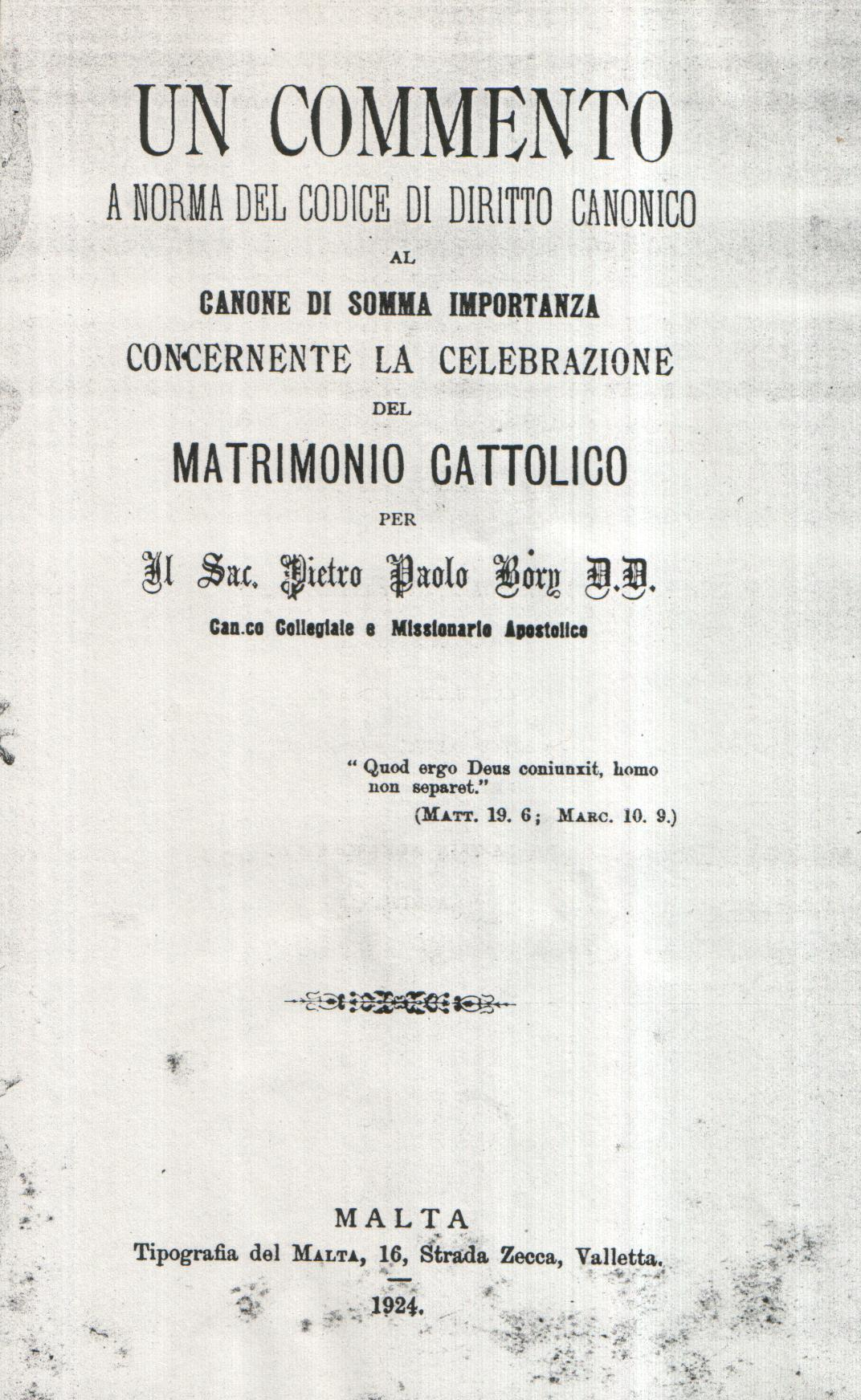
Un Commento a Norma del Codice di Diritto Canonico (1924) of Peter Paul Borg

Peter Paul Borg (1843–1934) was a Maltese theologian, canonist and minor philosopher. He specialized in the philosophy of law.

== Life ==
Borg was born in 1843. He became a diocesan priest, and was a Canon of the bishop's Cathedral Chapter. He was a Doctor of Theology and Divinity, and a Doctor of Canon Law. He was a member of the Società Storica e Scientifica di Malta (Historical and Scientific Society of Malta), and for a time also an Apostolic Prefect.

Assuming his duties as a Catholic priest in a country ruled by a Protestant colonial government, Borg had his eye set on the fine print of enacted legislation, and was particularly apt to read between the lines. Though he investigated all types of laws to detect whether they infringed upon the Catholic privileges and mores of the Maltese, his main concern, given the particular circumstances of his times, was reserved for the contraction of matrimony and, especially, on the problem of mixed or interfaith marriages between Catholics and Protestants. Together with the authorities of the Catholic Church, Borg harboured the suspicion that the Protestant colonial government took a laissez faire attitude towards mixed marriages in order to increase the Protestant population in the Maltese islands and thereby diminish Catholic influence.

Borg was thus part of a defensive strategy of the Catholic Church to preserve the Catholic heritage of the Maltese populace. Nevertheless, his protective stance went farther than this, since it was then equally important to strengthen Catholic traditions from within. Hence Borg was also part of an underlying movement sanctioned by Church authorities to combat and counter, possibly on philosophical grounds, any attempt to merge or compromise Catholic doctrine when efforts were made to bring into closer relations Catholics and Protestants.

== Works ==
Though Borg was a somewhat prolific writer, many of his compositions are of a religious or devotional nature with no interest to philosophy. Nonetheless, some of his publications are relevant to philosophy since Borg proffers arguments from reason to justify his positions. The following, than, are worthy of note:

- 1900 – La Questione Matrimoniale in Malta: Studio filosofico, canonico e politico con appendici (The Matrimonial Question in Malta: A philosophical, canonical and political study with appendixes). A 168-page book in Italian published in Naples, Italy (Stabilimento Tipografico Librario A.E.S. Festa, S. Biagio dei Librai). The work, which is divided into six main chapters and smaller parts, opens with an introduction, Pope Leo XIII's letter of 1897 Catholicorum quorundam, and a preface. At the end it bears twenty-two appendixes with largely relevant documents.

Borg traces the historical developments of matrimony in Malta, and comments at length from the point of views of the philosophy of law and the political philosophy. Taking Thomas Aquinas as the basis for his reflections, Borg's general drift is to show the philosophical coherence of Church legislation with regard to matrimony.

- 1911 – Il Valore del Sillabo di Pio X (The Value of Pius X Syllabus of Errors). A 630-page book in Italian published in Acireale, Sicily (Tipografia Editr. XX Secolo), which bears the sub-title: Dilucidato e chiarito in referenza al modernismo (Explained and clarified with reference to Modernism). The main aim of Borg’s composition is, as its sub-title indicates, to combat the threat of Modernism. Pope Pius X's notorious Symbol of Errors, issued in 1907, is taken as a point of departure and basis.

Apart from the introductions and documentary evidence at the end, the book is divided into three main parts. The first is historical and critical, the second is theoretical and analytical, and the third part is theoretical and practical.

- 1924 – Un Commentario a norma del Codice di Diritto Canonico al Canone di Somma Importanza Concernante la Celebrazione del Matrimonio Cattolico (A Commentary according to the Code of Canon Law on the Canon of Great Importance concerning the Celebration of Catholic Matrimony). A 118-page book in Italian published in Malta (Tipografia del 'Malta', Valletta) in which Borg comments Canon 1094 of the old 1917 Code Canon Law. The work is divided into six 'propositions', of which the first and fifth are the most relevant to philosophy. In the former, Borg give philosophical arguments to demonstrate how and why the essence of matrimony should be solely regulated by the Catholic Church. In the latter 'proposition' Borg explores the relation of matrimony to freedom.

== See also ==
- Philosophy in Malta
