= Albert Busuttil =

Maltese philosopher

- Born: 1891; Sliema, Malta
- Died: 1956; Malta
- Occupation: Philosophy

Albert Busuttil (1891–1956) was a Maltese minor philosopher. In philosophy he was mostly interested in politics and labour rights.

== Life ==
Busuttil was born at Sliema, Malta in 1891. He studied at the Lyceum and at the University of Malta, and later joined the Jesuits. He continued his philosophical studies in Jersey, France, and his theology in Posillipo, Naples, in Italy, both centres of Jesuit teaching. He was ordained a priest in 1922. Afterwards, he taught ethics in Ireland, and history of philosophy in Catania, Sicily. In Malta he taught philosophy, apologetics, mathematics, physics, and sociology. Between 1928 and 1945 Busuttil was Prefect of Studies at St. Aloysius College, Malta.

During World War II (1939–45) Busuttil would go around cities and villages gathering people in public squares and introducing them to the social teaching of the Catholic Church. After the war he was than especially close to workers who were part of the newly founded General Workers Union, particularly at the shipyards. To people like Busuttil, the main worry in those days was the infiltration of the communist ideology within the workers’ movement. In 1947 he was appointed Spiritual Director of the union, an office he held up till 1951. He died in 1956.

== Works ==
Busuttil brought together his philosophical erudition and prowess, and his interest in mass education, particularly of workers. To this effect, he published a large number of pamphlets – more than sixty – which could serve as pocket-guides to the themes he chose to deal with. Though adopting a popular style and common language, he backed any of his arguments with a philosophical line of reasoning. Amongst his most worthy of consideration to philosophy, and also the most representatives of Busuttil’s thoughts and style, are the following:

- 1945 - Dokumentazzjoni Nisranija-Kommunista (Christian-Communist Documentation).
- 1946 - Dostoievsky: Habbar tal-Bolxevizmu (Dostoyevsky: The Harbinger of Bolshevism).
- 1946 - That il-Hakma tal-Mingel u tal-Martell (Under the Yoke of the Sickle and Hammer).
- 1946 - It-‘Test Case’ Jew Il-Kalvarju tal-Polonja (The Test Case or Polond’s Calvary).
- 1946 - Il-Gwerra, il-Paci u l-Knisja (War, Peace and the Catholic Church).
- 1946 - Responsabbiltajiet u Rikostruzzjoni Socjali (Responsibilities and Social Riconstruction).
- 1946 - Zewg Gganti: USSR - USA (Two Giants: USSR - USA).
- 1946 - Demokraziji u Partit (Democracies and Political Parties).

== See also ==
- Philosophy in Malta
