= Dominic Bezzina =

Maltese philosopher

- Born: Malta
- Occupation: Philosophy

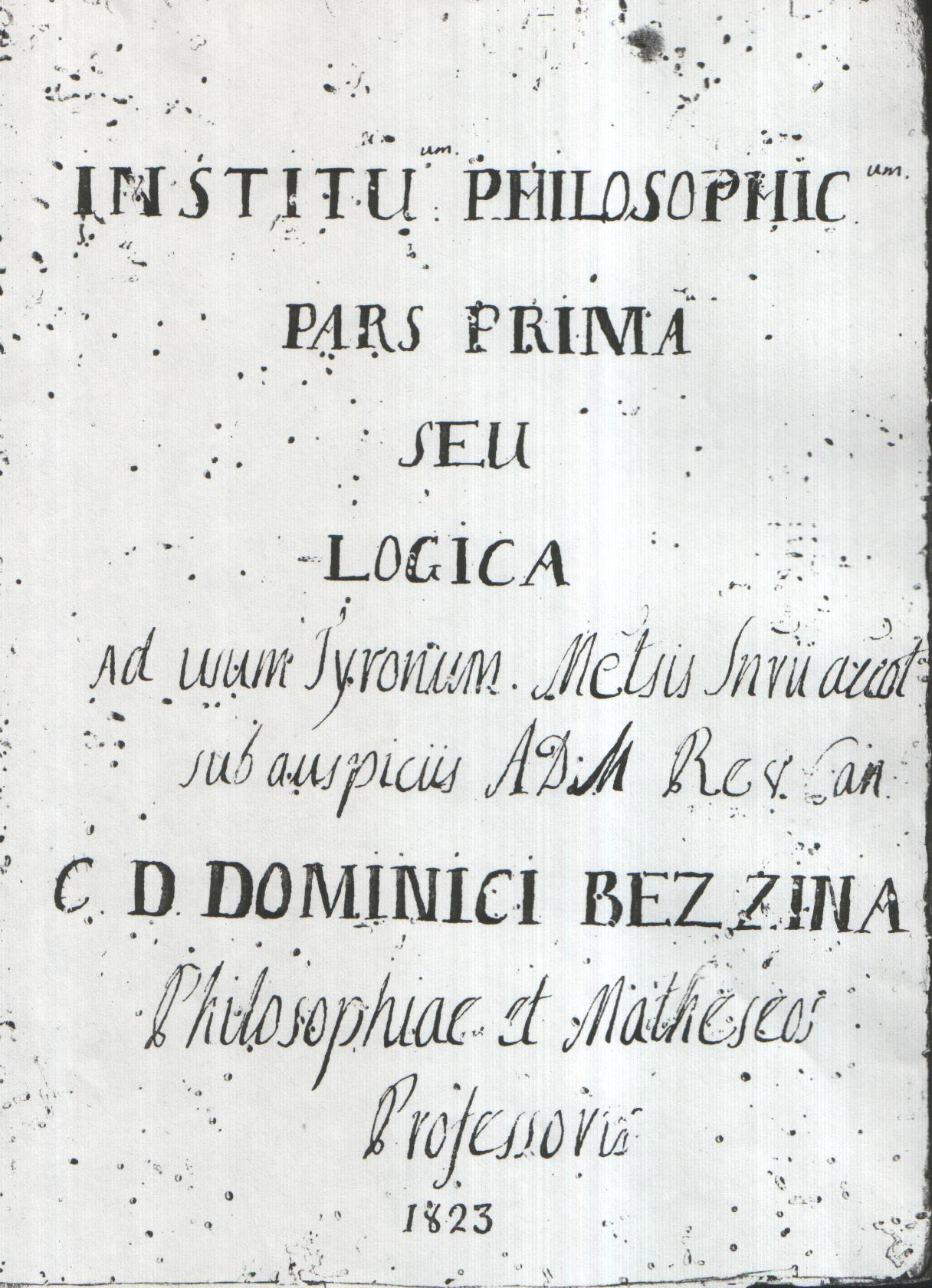
Institutum Philosophicum (1823) of Dominic Bezzina

Dominic Bezzina (18th/19th centuries) was a minor Maltese philosopher who mainly specialised in physics. He also dealt with logic.

== Life ==
It seems that Bezzina was born around the mid-18th century. After becoming a priest, he taught philosophy and science at the Cathedral School at Mdina, Malta. He was also a Canon at the Bishop's Cathedral Chapter. Bezzina taught at Mdina at least since 1819. One of the courses he delivered concerned physics.

== Extant work ==
Bezzina's only extant work is called Institutum Philosophicum (Philosophical Teaching). It is still in manuscript form, and contains 171 back to back folios. Unfortunately, the document is certainly incomplete. The extant manuscript is just the first part of a larger work. It is not known how many further part the whole work contained.

The extant part of the Institutum concerns logic. The division is typically that of Scholasticism, organised in books, chapters, and articles. Throughout the work Bezzina discusses the nature and conditions of Aristotelian logic, consciousness, and the genesis of ideas.

== See also ==
- Philosophy in Malta
