= John Micallef =

- Born: 1923; Victoria, Gozo, Malta
- Died: 2003 (aged 79–80); West Vancouver, BC, Canada
- Occupation: Philosophy

John Micallef (1923–2003) was a Maltese philosopher. Although his thoughts remained philosophically grounded in the Christian tradition, he was primarily interested in existentialism.

== Life ==
Micallef was born in Victoria, Gozo, one of Malta's subsidiary islands, in 1923. After completing his studies at the Lyceum in Malta, he continued studying at the Gregorian University of Rome. From Gregorian, he acquired a Masters in philosophy. He also studied philosophy at Heythop College in London, England. From the University of London he acquired a Bachelor of Arts in Italian language, and another master's degree in linguistics. He completed 3rd-cycle studies at Laval University in Quebec City, receiving a doctorate in philosophy. From the University of Western Colorado in the United States of America he acquired, in 1973, a second doctorate, in arts. In 1980, he also acquired a Masters in Christian studies from Regent College of Vancouver, British Columbia, Canada. In addition to his prior studies, he pursued further coursework at the university of Oña, in Spain, and at the University of Innsbruck, in Austria.

During the fifties, Micallef was a teacher of languages. He was elected and he served for some time as member of the Malta Legislative Assembly before he emigrated from Malta to Canada in 1964. He eventually settled in Nelson, British Columbia, and then in Oregon, United States. In Nelson, he was associate professor of philosophy at Notre Dame University of Nelson. He was also associate professor of philosophy at the University of Portland, and at Mount Angel College, both in Oregon. Micallef died in 2003 in Vancouver, BC Canada.

== Work ==
Philosophy of Existence, was published in 1969 (Philosophical Library, New York, U.S.A.). As its title indicates, in this 225-page composition, Micallef reveals an existentialist perspective. The book is basically divided into four parts, each one sub-divided into chapters.

Additional publications by Micallef include the poetry collections No Destination- A Travellers Way and Joy is my Gift.

== Sources ==
- Mark Montebello, Il-Ktieb tal-Filosofija f’Malta (A Source Book of Philosophy in Malta), PIN Publications, Malta, 2001.
- Mark Montebello, Malta’s Philosophy & Philosophers, PIN Publications, Malta, 2011.

== See also ==
- Philosophy in Malta
