= Girna =

Type of hut found in Malta

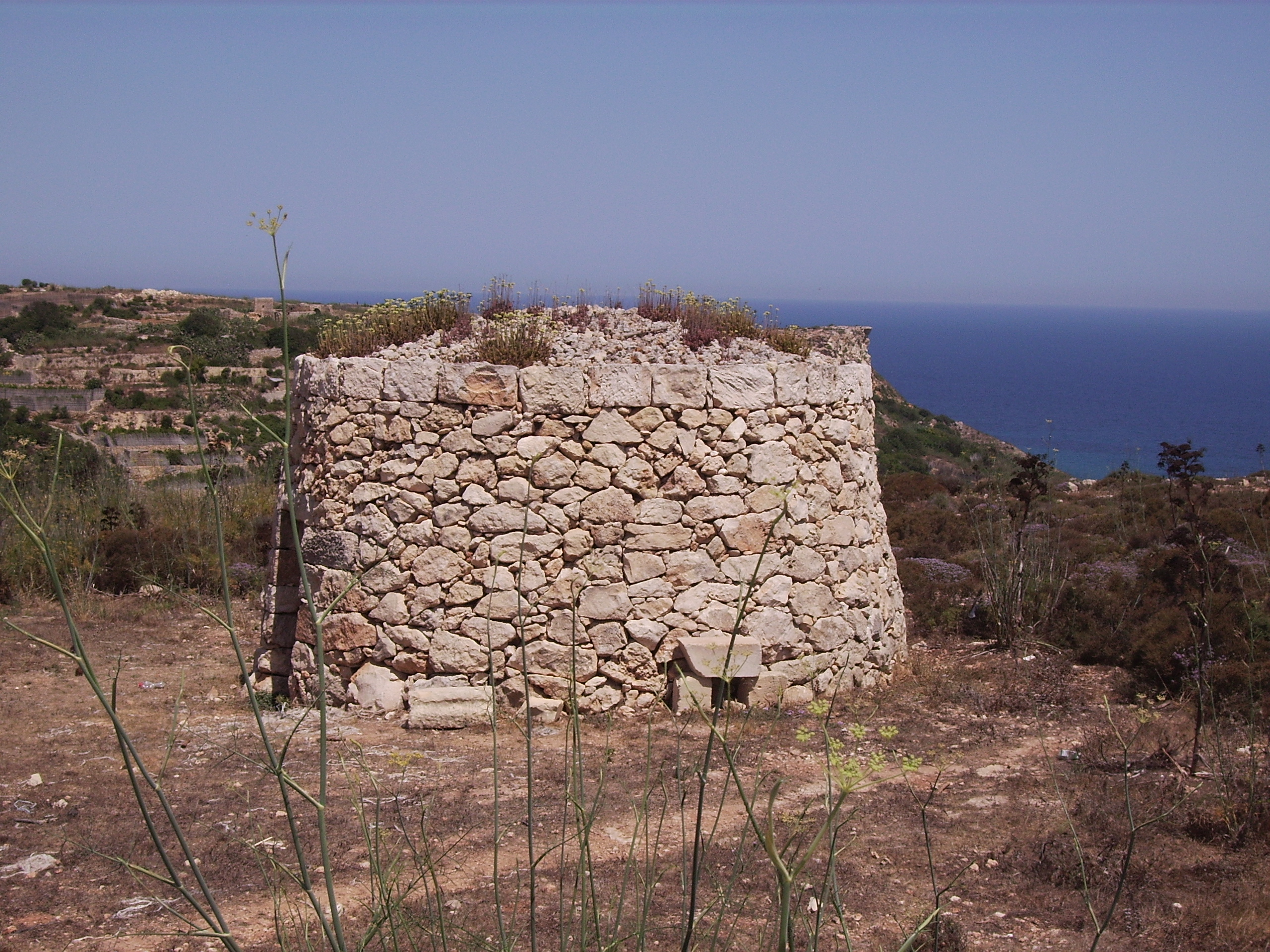
A girna near the Sopu Tower in the limits of Nadur, Gozo

A girna (plural giren) is a type of traditional corbelled hut found in rural areas in parts of Malta. They bear similarities with a number of dry stone vernacular building types found in other Mediterranean countries, and they are primarily used for storage or as temporary shelters. It is possible that in the past they were also used for human habitation. The design reflects local architectural adaptations to the environment, emphasizing durability and functionality.

== History and use ==
It is not known when the first giren were constructed in Malta. Their typology bears some similarities with the Megalithic Temples of Malta, although there is no conclusive proof that the building traditions are directly linked, and it has been suggested that the resemblance is superficial. The huts also share characteristics with other vernacular constructions in the Mediterranean region, such as the nuraghe of Sardinia, the trulli of Apulia, the bunje of the former Yugoslavia, the borie of France and other types of huts found in Sicily and Libya.

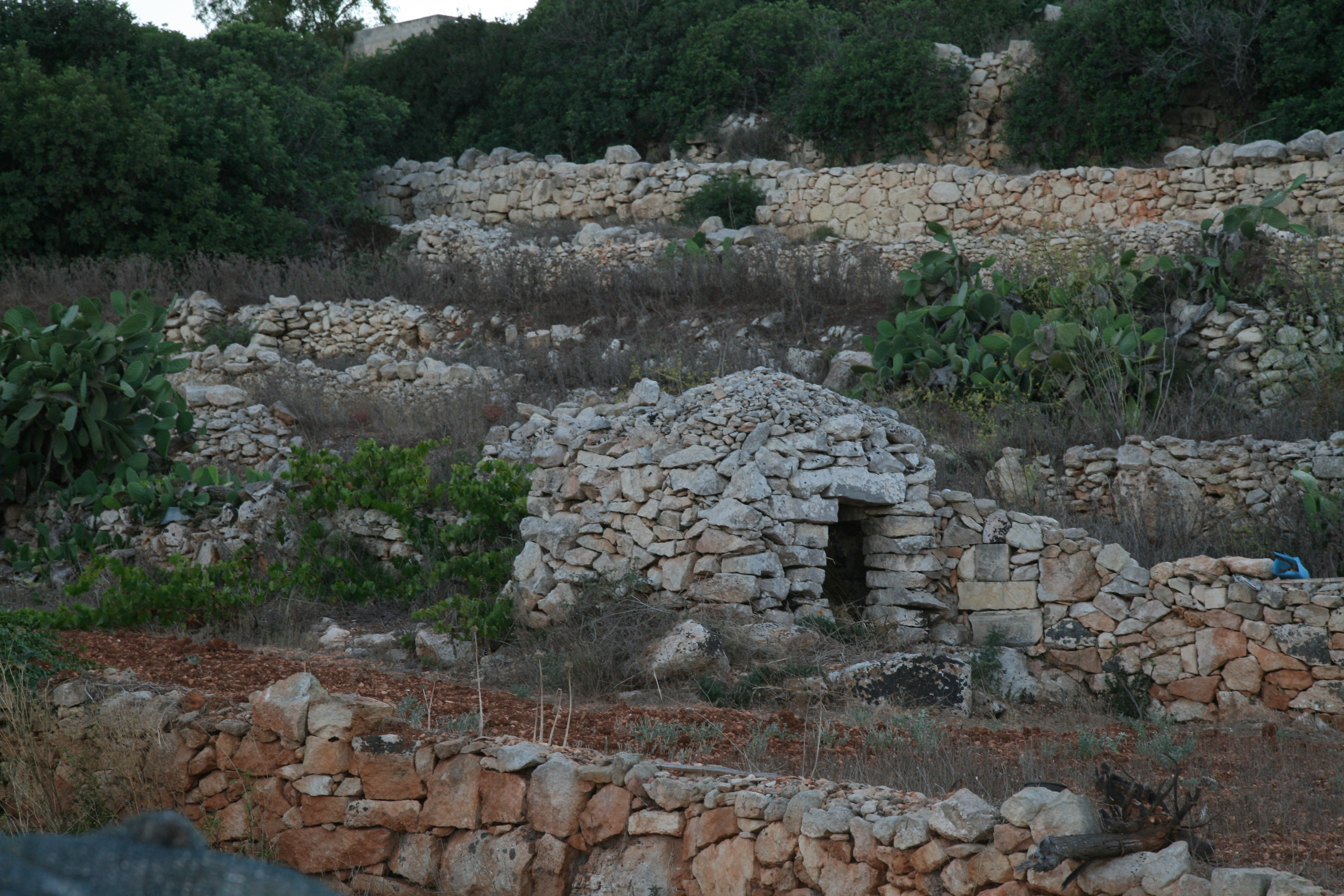
A girna in a rural area, surrounded by rubble walls

In his 1536 publication Insulae Melitae Descriptio, Jean Quintin mentioned that the Maltese countryside contained many vernacular structures which he called "African huts", and this might have referred to the girna. Larger giren were probably used for human habitation, and it is likely that many were abandoned as isolated rural communities gave way to larger villages and towns in the 17th and 18th centuries. Smaller giren were mostly used to store tools or hay, as temporary shelters for farmers or herders, or to house goats, sheep or other livestock. The frequency of giren near certain quarries, such as in Qala on Gozo, suggests that some were also used as shelters for workmen.

Due to the primitive nature of their construction, giren were not particularly influenced by changes which occurred in other aspects of Maltese architecture over the centuries. Assigning a date of construction to a particular girna is difficult unless it is documented in other evidence, but it is believed that many of the existing structures are relatively recent. The first study of the girna was made by Paul Cassar in 1961, and several other studies have been published since then, most notably a book in Maltese by historian Mikiel Fsadni in 1990 which was also translated to English in 1992.

Many giren have been lost through neglect, but many others still exist and some remain in use, mainly for storage. A few giren are still being built as of the early 21st century; for example, one was constructed at the Ta' Blankas olive grove in Xewkija in 2014 as part of a refurbishment project.

== Locations ==
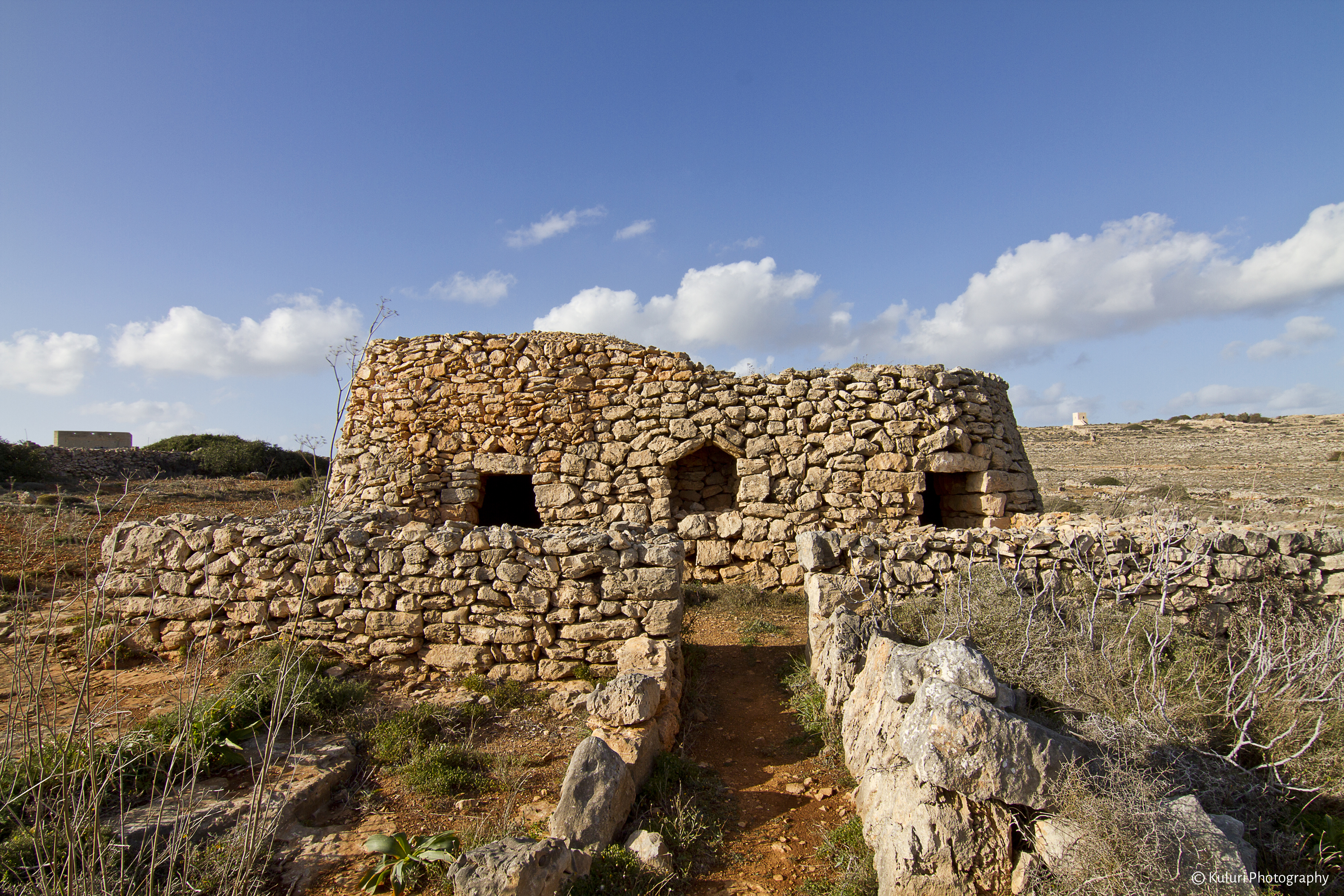
A girna complex at the Majjistral Park

Most giren are found in rural areas in the northern part of the main island of Malta. They are especially frequent in the limits of Mellieħa, including the land around Manikata, l-Aħrax tal-Mellieħa, the area around Selmun Palace and the area between Saint Agatha's Tower and Paradise Bay. Over 30 giren can be found in the Majjistral Park. Other areas in the northwestern part of Malta which contain some giren include Żebbiegħ, Bidnija, Dingli, Baħrija and Mtaħleb.

The areas where giren are located usually contain rocky outcrops of hard coralline limestone, which was the main material used in the huts' construction. These areas tended to lack more workable materials such as globigerina limestone. This might explain why giren are less common in the southern part of Malta and on the island of Gozo, where globigerina limestone is abundant and where it was often used to construct ashlar masonry buildings. Most giren in Gozo are clustered in the parts of the island which consist of Upper Coralline Limestone, such as Xagħra, Nadur and Qala.

== Characteristics ==
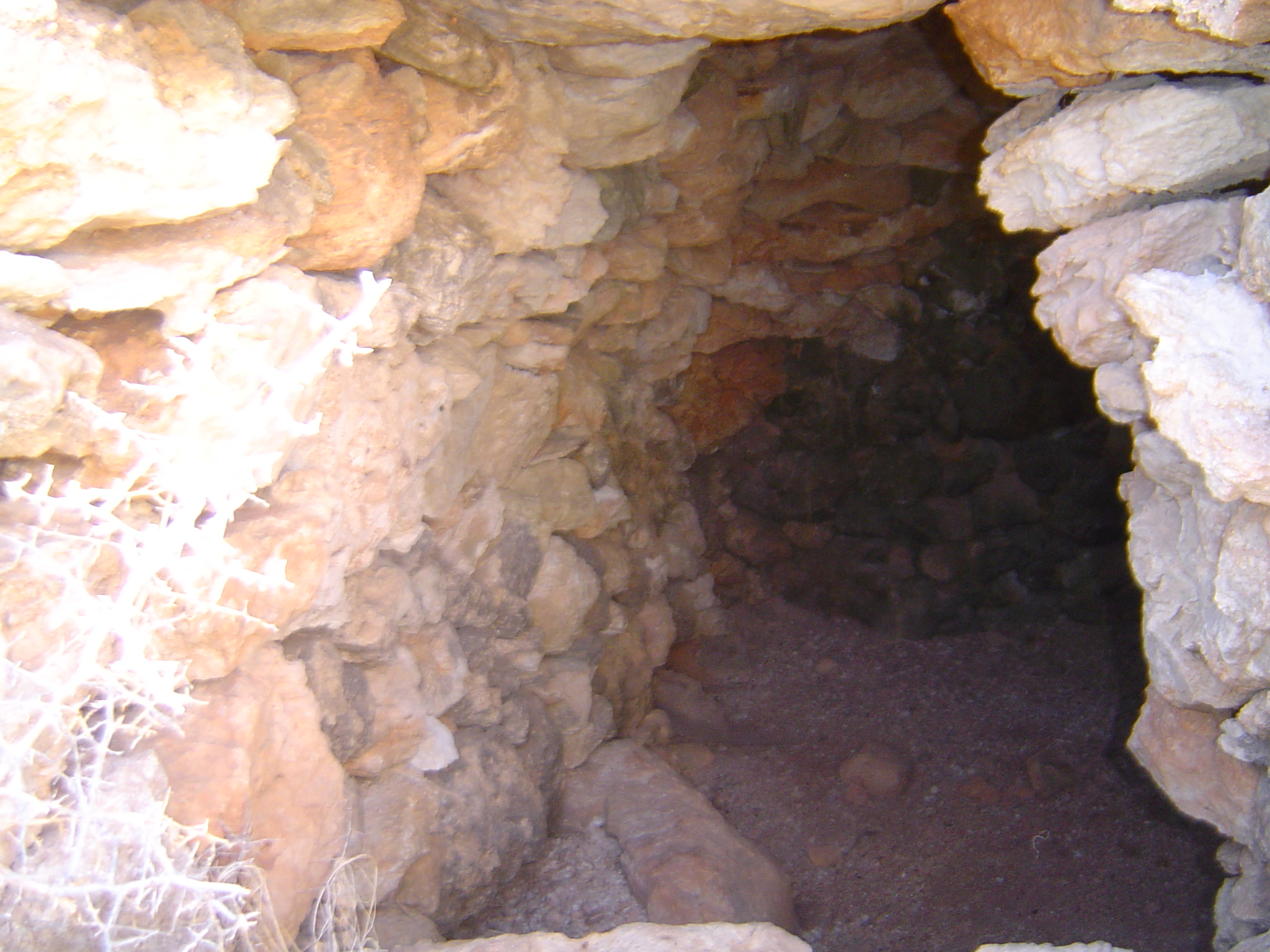
The interior of a girna built adjacent to an 18th-century building known as the Devil's Farmhouse

Giren are huts constructed out of undressed dry stone, and they were usually built out of loose pieces of coralline limestone, which were either obtained through quarrying or through clearing loose stones from a piece of land in order to allow for it to be cultivated. The walls are usually around 90 cm (35 in) thick, and they consist of two skins of stone with a rubble infill known as mazkan in between. The roof of the girna is constructed using corbelling, with each row of stones jutting out slightly from the row below it, gradually reducing the size of the opening until flat stone slabs can be used to span it. This results in a dome-shaped concave ceiling, bearing similarities to ancient beehive tombs. Gravel and torba were usually used to cover the roof, while sometimes a pebble-like material called ċagħqija was used for this purpose.

Most giren have a circular plan, but there are some which are square, rectangular or oval-shaped. They usually have a single door facing east or south, and this opening is spanned by lintels, while some also have windows. Some giren were additionally buttressed by rubble walls, and a few allow access to the roof through an external staircase or ramp. There are also examples of giren with two floors, consisting of one hut built on top of another. Mangers were sometimes found inside giren used to raise livestock.

The huts are prone to collapse if they are left without proper maintenance.

== Influence on architecture ==
In the 1960s, the Maltese architect Richard England drew inspiration from the girna when designing the curved walls of the Manikata parish church, which is regarded as one of the most iconic 20th century churches in Malta. England also designed a residential building called Villa Girna which used the vernacular huts as a source of inspiration, but it was never actually constructed.
