= Peter Serracino Inglott =

Maltese Catholic priest and philosopher (1936–2012)

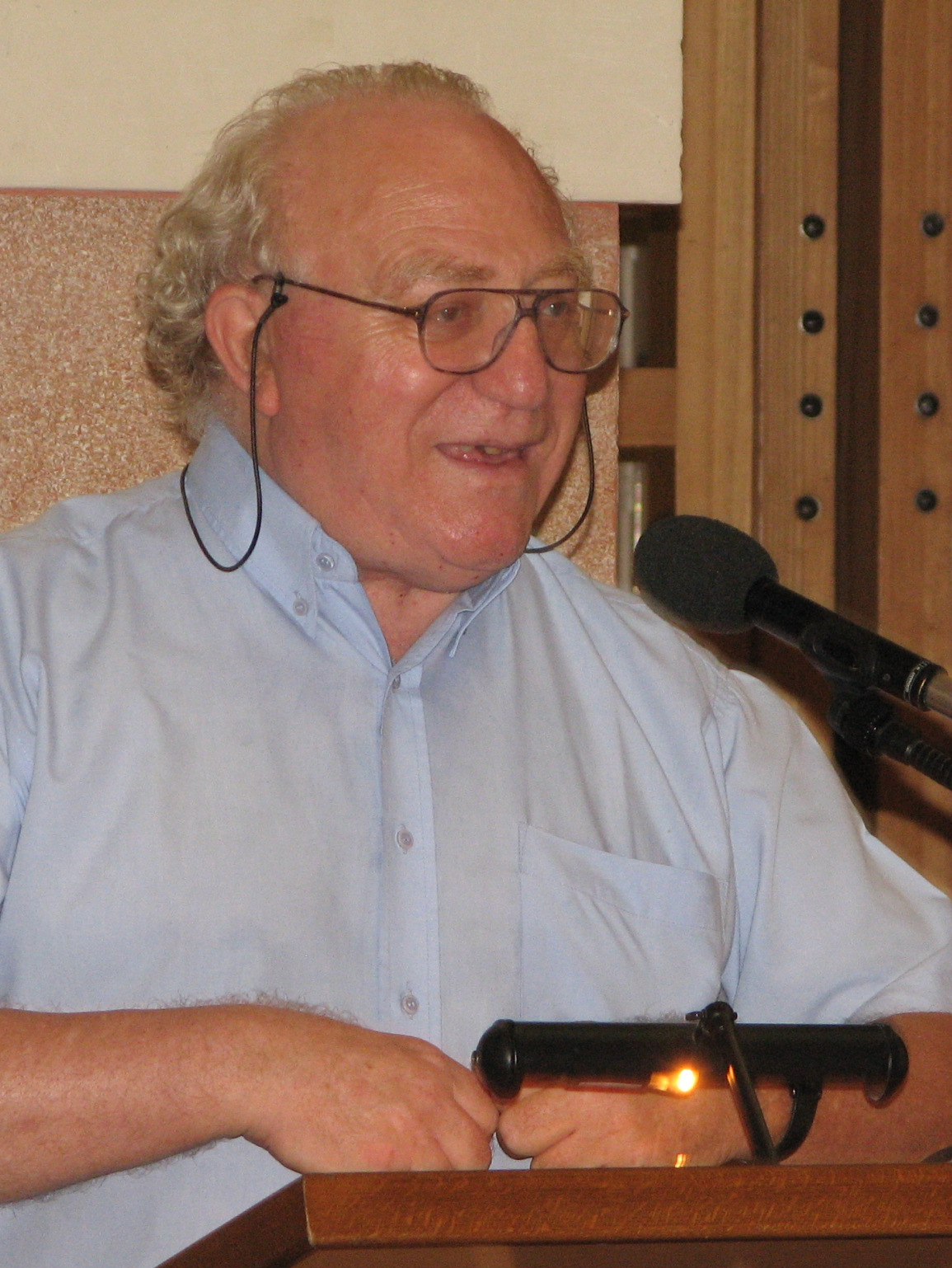
- Serracino Inglott speaking at Researchers' Night 2007, at Saint James Cavalier, Malta
- Born: 26 April 1936
- Died: 16 March 2012 (aged 75)
- Education: University of Malta; Oxford University; Institut Catholique de Paris; Università Cattolica del Sacro Cuore

Peter Serracino Inglott (26 April 1936 – 16 March 2012) was a Maltese Catholic priest, philosopher, scholar and rector of the University of Malta from 1987 to 1988, then consecutively from 1991 to 1996. He was awarded the title of Emeritus Professor of philosophy at the University of Malta. He was a key figure at reconstructing the Maltese education system and held academia to his personal life prominently. He was also politically affiliated with the country's Nationalist Party, serving as advisor to former Prime Minister of Malta, Eddie Fenech Adami.

Serracino Inglott was ordained in Milan by Cardinal Montini, later Pope Paul VI.

== Life and career ==
Born on 26 April 1936 to Oscar and Maria Calamatta in Valletta, he was brought up during the post-war Maltese environment. Serracino-Inglott studied at the Royal University of Malta (BA 1951–1955), Campion Hall, Oxford as a Rhodes Scholar (MA 1955–1958), the Institut Catholique de Paris (BD cum laude 1958–1960) and the Università Cattolica del Sacro Cuore (Ph.D. 1960–1963) with a thesis on Wittgenstein’s Tractatus Logico-Philosophicus.

He started working at the University of Malta as a librarian in 1963 and two years later he started teaching philosophy. In 1971 he became an established professor at the University and served as chairperson of philosophy, a post he would retain for seven years until the Prime Minister of Malta, Dom Mintoff, suspended the chair. He would return as chairperson in 1987 when the post was resumed and would consecutively retain the post until 1996. Serracino Inglott was professor of aesthetics at the 'Instituto Internazionale di Arte e Liturgia' at Milan, visiting professor at Paris II Sorbonne (1989–1990), UNESCO Fellow at the Open University, UK (1978) and guest lecturer at the universities of Cincinnati, Milan (Cattolica), Venice (Ca Foscari), Palermo and the College of Europe at Bruges (1989, 1990).

During his advisory role within the Nationalist Party, his emphasis on welfare and charity was seen as strange within a fiscally conservative environment. He was often mistaken to be partisan, but had often expressed his sympathy with the Nationalist Party due to its positive relationship with the Catholic Church in Malta. With regards to the opposing Labour Party, Fr Peter had this to say of former Prime Minister Dom Mintoff: "The great pity is that I have always had a great deal of sympathy with Mintoff's ideas. It was his manner of implementing them that I always thought was wrong".

He was conferred honorary doctorates by Brunel University in the United Kingdom, Luther College, Iowa and the International Maritime Organization's International Maritime Law Institute. He was also honoured by the French, Italian, Portuguese and Maltese governments respectively with the Chevalier of the Légion d'honneur (1990), Cavaliere di Gran Croce of the Ordine al Merito (1995) and Companion of the Order of Merit (Malta) (1995).

He was one of three Maltese representatives at the Convention on the Future of Europe presided by Valéry Giscard d'Estaing, contributing to various aspects of the debate at the Convention ranging from proposed amendments to include a reference to Europe's Christian traditions to procedural proposals to streamline the EU's decision-making process. He was one of the founder members of the Today Public Policy Institute.

The Priest was characterized as joyful, passionate about learning yet forgetful of everyday things. His forgetfulness would sometimes result in comical situations which oftentimes confused his colleagues. Most notable was his office's order, often described as messy and 'chaotic' yet somehow sensible only to him.

Fr. Peter Serracino Inglott was a lifelong friend of Maltese architect Richard England. Having met while still in their adolescence, they immediately took interest in each other's respective talents, with which they would use produce several joint projects in literature, poetry, architecture, opera, and the visual arts. An observer of the Second Vatican Council, Fr. Peter would prove instrumental in achieving the pastoral component of the council through the church designs of England, starting with the Church of St. Joseph in Manikata (1974).

== Philosophy ==
A disciple of the 20th Century revival of Thomism, Fr. Peter was notably interested in the works of Ludwig Wittgenstein and Henri Bergson's insights into laughter, the latter of which underpinned his interest on clowns and their roles in society, along with the writings of Desiderus Erasmus. As a Catholic priest, he was in agreement with Karol Józef Wojtyła's philosophy of personalism, and (later as John Paul II) his encyclical Fides et ratio, once quoted as stating; "The discovery of God is recognized within, especially within the Creation, and this is recognized from its study".

His first principal philosophical text was Beginning Philosophy (1987). Additionally, he wrote and expressed himself in the media on a variety of subjects (notably on biotechnology and human rights ).

Fr. Peter approached the works of Karl Marx and Sigmund Freud and read them within his role as a priest, often using their insights of history and psychoanalysis in a pastoral framework, writing frequently for the theological journal Melita Theologica. He advocated for human rights and pushed, along with Arvid Pardo, for the United Nations to recognize the ocean bed as a common heritage of mankind.

In 1995, Fr. Peter publishes 'Peopled Silence: a guided tour of some zones of puzzlement in the philosophy of language', a textbook for students which combines both a general study and personal insights into the philosophy of language. In it, he surveys Noam Chomsky and Jürgen Habermas' respective contributions on language and communicative action, along with the impact of language on music, and the validity of George Orwell's 'Politics and the English language'. In his lectures, he often emphasized the importance of language as a defining feature of humanity, from which (referring to Bergson's treaties on 'Laughter') emerges the capacity of telling jokes. From this, he identifies the role of the 'fool' in terms of the medieval court clown, and therefrom sets a binary of 'serious fooling' as opposed to 'foolish seriousness'. With it, Fr. Peter defined the role of the philosopher in society in practical terms; as a foolish court clown who works opposite to the seriousness of the court King.

Within politics, he served as an advisor to the Nationalist Party, largely serving its Christian Democracy wing. Within the Nationalist Party, he advocated for the principles of solidarity and subsidiarity, welfare, and a Thomistic reading of human rights. He introduced the concept of the 'dialogue society' as a method for fostering class solidarity, and improving communication between the old-left of the Labour Party, economic liberals, and Christian democrats, within the Nationalist Party's 1987 manifesto.

Echoing the economic teachings of Pope Leo XIII, and the criticism of the 'self' introduced by French anthropologist Claude Levi-Strauss, he became critical of the conditions set by capitalism, thus arguing in a 2008 interview;

"Unfortunately it happened that the alternative to capitalism that some states had been trying was centralised planning - in reality another form of capitalism, precisely because of making economics the supreme value."

Instead, he found value in the economic and communicative role of co-operatives, and in 2008 ardently criticized the privatization of Malta's dockyard and shipbuilding site. Because of his care towards working class needs and workers' unions, he was colloquially referred to as 'the red priest'.

Fr. Peter possessed an interest in art and opera, from which he worked to collaborate with composer Charles Camilleri on 'The Maltese Cross', an opera which explores Maltese identity, along with the Mediterranean region standing out as a leitmotif in his thought and core interest. A noteworthy result of Fr. Peter's exploration of Pierre Teilhard de Chardin, he introduced Camilleri to de Chardin's poem 'La Messe Sur Le Monde', from which Camilleri composed his most notable work Missa Mundi. Fr. Peter's interest in language and music led to him writing 'The Creative Use of Noise' with Camilleri. Published posthumously in 2015, the book covers a structuralist exploration of audible phenomena, the meaning of noise itself and the value of audible aesthetics.

Despite having sympathies with social conservatism, Fr. Peter was notably open on matters related to biotechnology which inevitably brought controversy among his conservative peers. In 2006 he infamously contradicted the Catholic Church's position on conception of human life as he argued that during the first fourteen days after fertilization, the entity present cannot be defined as a person.

A former student Dr. Mario Vella wrote a critical assessment of Peter Serracino Inglott as philosopher, Reflections in a Canvas Bag: Beginning Philosophy Between Politics and History.

Fr. Peter is remembered for his contributions towards philosophy, mainly his hours of lectures and talks on language, culture and art.

== Death ==
Fr. Peter Serracino Inglott died on 16 March 2012. He was diagnosed with Creutzfeldt–Jakob disease and was treated at Mater Dei Hospital. The funeral took place at the Church of Saint Paul, Valletta.

== Selected bibliography ==
- Linji Godda. Malta. 1973.
- ‘Secolarizzazione e linguaggio’, in Crisi dell’Occidente e Fondazione della Cultura (ed. N. Incardona), Palermo (1976);
- ‘Malta and the EEC: The Priority of Political Considerations’, in Azad Perspektiv, Malta, no. 8 (1979);
- Worsley, P.; Kitromilides, P., eds. (1979). The Law of the Sea and the Development of Mediterranean Regional Institutions. in Small States in the Modern World: The Conditions of Survival. Nicosia.
- Mediterranean Music, UNESCO (1988) with Charles Camilleri;
- ‘The Mediterranean Story-Telling Sailor: Odysseus and Sinbad’ in Atti della Terza Assemblea Plenaria della Communità delle Università Mediterranee (1989);
- ‘Responsabilità morali degli scienziati nei confronti delle generazioni future’ in Scienza ed Etica nella Centralità dell’ Uomo (ed. P. Cattorini), Milano (1990);
- Compostella, Malta (1993) Libretto of an Opera on the European significance of the pilgrimage in medieval and contemporary times;
- It-tieni mewt ta' Lazzru. Malta. 1994.
- The Maltese Cross, Malta (1995) – A European Opera on the mystery of Schiller's Die Malteser;
- Pynchon, Wittgenstein and Malta (1995) with Petra Bianchi et al.;
- The volume Interfaces, essays in honour of Peter Serracino-Inglott (1997) with contributions by:
  - Alain Blondy (Professor of History at the Sorbonne)
  - David E. Cooper (Professor of Philosophy at the University of Durham)
  - David Farley-Hills (Emeritus Professor at the University of Wales)
  - John Haldane (Professor of Philosophy and Head of the School of Philosophical and Anthropological Studies at the University of St. Andrews)
  - Peter Jones (Professor of Philosophy and Director of the Institute for Advanced Studies in the Humanities at the University of Edinburgh)
  - Elisabeth Mann Borgese (Professor of Politics at Dalhousie University)
  - Federico Mayor (Director General of UNESCO)
  - Paul Streeten (Professor of Economics and chairman of the editorial board of the bi-monthly journal World Development)
  - contains a brief biography of Peter Serracino Inglott by his successor in the chair of philosophy at the University of Malta Joe Friggieri and a very useful annotated bibliography.
- Encounters with Malta (2000), co-edited with Petra Bianchi;
- Adeodata Pisani: A Mystic Nun in Mdina (2018), edited by Petra Caruana Dingli, with contributions by Ranier Fsadni and Hector Scerri

== See also ==
- Philosophy in Malta
