= Ta' Qali National Park =

Urban national park in central Malta

- Malta National Park
- Park Nazzjonali ta’ Malta
- Location within Malta
- Type: Urban park
- Location: Ta' Qali (Ħ'Attard), Malta
- Coordinates: 35.8926°N 14.4215°E
- Area: 0.35 km^{2} (0.14 sq mi) (350,000 m^{2} (3,800,000 sq ft))
- Created: Regeneration launched 2020
- Operator: Government of Malta (Public Works / Ambjent Malta; specialised unit as of 2023)
- Status: Open all year
- Website: maltanationalpark.mt

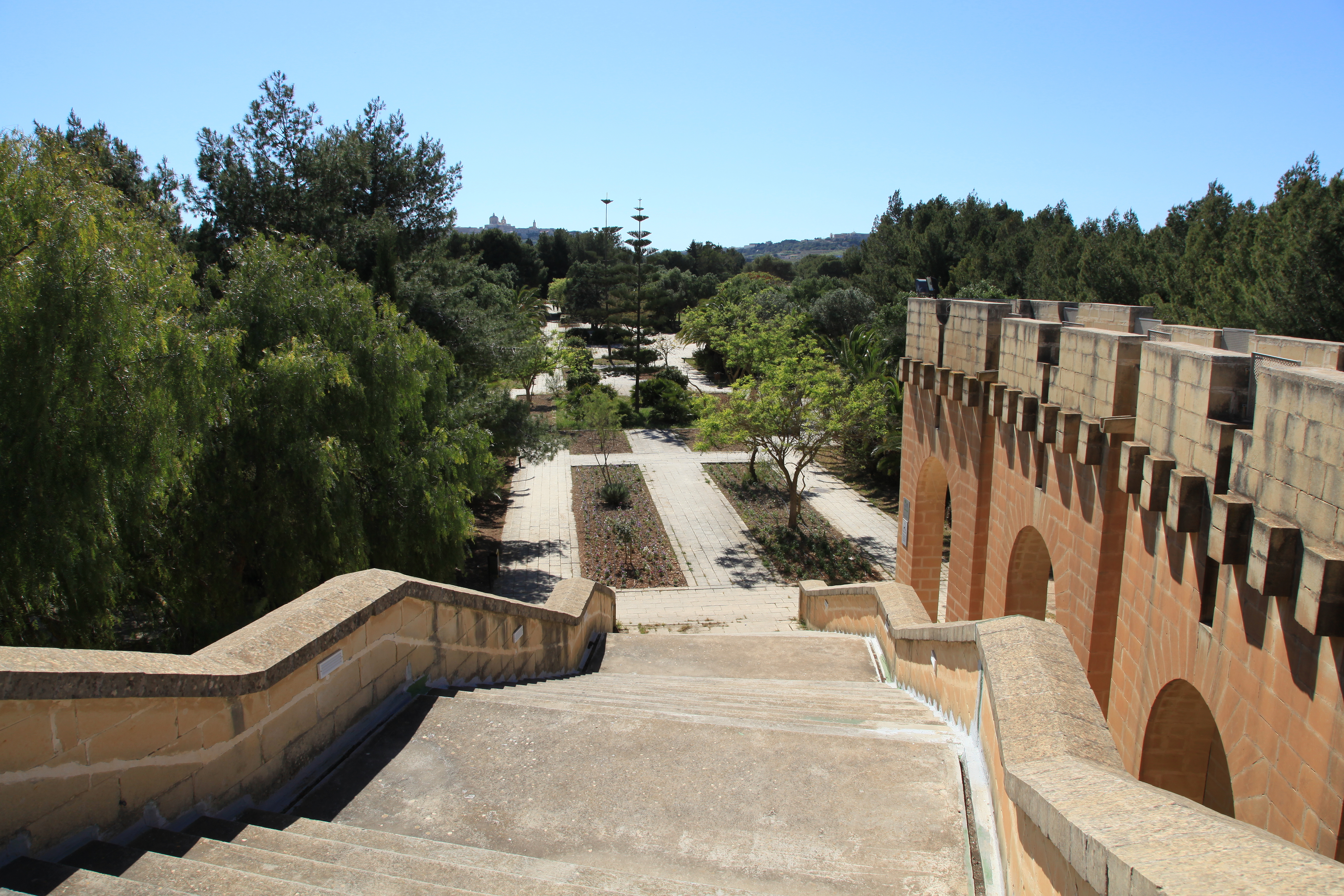
Ta’ Qali National Park

Ta' Qali National Park, also branded as the Malta National Park, is a large public park in Ta' Qali within the limits of Attard, central Malta. It occupies part of the former RAF Ta' Kali airfield and today comprises formal gardens, picnic and play areas, a petting farm, dog park, nature trails and an open-air concert arena. The ongoing regeneration, launched in 2020, covers about 350,000 m^{2} (3,800,000 sq ft) and is one of Malta’s largest green-infrastructure projects.

== Name ==
The site is widely known as Ta’ Qali National Park, after the locality; in recent government communications it is also referred to as the Malta National Park. Maltese-language materials use the name Park Nazzjonali ta’ Malta.

== History ==
The area formed part of RAF Ta’ Kali, a wartime airfield with grass runways used during the Second World War and thereafter; following the end of RAF operations the site was progressively converted to recreational use.

In May 2019 government announced plans to expand and upgrade the park, including new trails and amenities. A multi-year regeneration programme began in 2020, with works led by Public Works entities; by 2023 a specialised management unit was created to coordinate large public-realm projects including Ta’ Qali.

== Description ==
The park is a cluster of landscaped zones and facilities around Ta’ Qali, adjoining the National Stadium, the Malta Aviation Museum and the Ta’ Qali Artisan Village.

- Formal Garden – a 16,000 m^{2} (170,000 sq ft) garden designed by architect Joseph Spiteri and re-landscaped with new paving, planting and irrigation.
- Picnic / Recreation Area – approximately 6 ha (15 acres) of open lawns and shaded tables.
- Adventure Park – children’s zone (16,000 m^{2} (170,000 sq ft)) with play structures, fountains and café.
- Dog Park – Malta’s first dedicated dog park, opened 2012.
- Petting Farm – family facility with small animals and play areas.
- Concert Area – an open-air arena on a 14,700 m^{2} (158,000 sq ft) site with stage, kiosks, lighting, irrigation tanks and ≈1,500 trees and shrubs.

== 2024–2025 developments ==
On 4 May 2024 the Prime Minister inaugurated a €16 million concert zone within Ta’ Qali National Park, following months of finishing works. By April 2025, government reported progress on regeneration of the Picnic Area used by families each weekend.

Procurement notices for 2025 included contracts for irrigation water supply (€195,000) and construction of a lift/stair building at the Concert Area (€338,179).

=== Events in 2024–2025 ===
- Earth Garden 2024 (6–9 June 2024) at Ta’ Qali Picnic Area.
- Farsons Beer Festival 2024 (25 July–3 August 2024).
- Earth Garden 2025 (18th edition) held June 2025.
- Farsons Beer Festival 2025 (3–12 July 2025).

=== 2025 gravel works debate ===
In mid-2025 resurfacing with gravel at parts of the Picnic Area prompted public debate. Park chairman Jason Micallef dismissed online claims as “fake news” in September 2025; further calls for transparency followed in October, and continued scrutiny was reported in November 2025.

== Management ==
Park embellishment and maintenance involve Ambjent Malta and the Public Works Department; a specialised unit was established in 2023 to oversee projects including Ta’ Qali.

== Ecology and planting ==
Afforestation and landscaping works have included around 1,500 trees and shrubs and upgraded irrigation systems, building on earlier reforestation initiatives.

== Access ==
The park is served by Malta Public Transport routes connecting Valletta, Mosta and St Julian’s.

== Nearby landmarks ==
- National Stadium (MFA headquarters)
- Malta Aviation Museum
- Ta’ Qali Crafts Village

== Reception and issues ==
The concert area’s design has generated discussion over the balance between green space and event infrastructure, while parliamentary and audit scrutiny has highlighted project cost increases for the wider regeneration.

== See also ==
- Il-Majjistral Nature and History Park
- Salina National Park
- Buskett Gardens
