= List of rectors of the University of Malta =

The following is a list of rectors of the University of Malta since 1771. Rectors are currently elected by the University Council by secret ballot, for a 5-year term.

== 18th century ==
1771–1773: Roberto Ranieri Costaguti

1773–1776: Francesco Bonnici (Prefect of Studies)

1776–1780: Domenico A. Malarbì

1780–1786: Giuseppe Angelo Moncada

1787–1788: Prospero Xuereb

1790–1797: Maturino Francesco de Muller

1798: Giovanni Villet Bellet

== 19th century ==
1800–1822: Francesco Saverio Caruana

1822–1833: Girolamo Saverio Inglott

1834–1841: Emmanuele Rosignaud

1841–1842: Thaddeus O'Malley

1842–1843: Pietro Paolo Psaila (Acting Rector)

1844–1854: William Henry Butt

1854–1880: Saverio Schembri

1880–1887: Sigismondo Savona

1887–1896: Antonio Annetto Caruana

1897–1904: Napoleone Tagliaferro

== 20th century ==
1904–1920: Enrico Magro

1920–1926: Themistocles Zammit

1926–1934: Thomas Agius

1934–1948: Robert Victor Galea

1948–1963: Joseph Anthony Manché

1963–1980: Edwin Borg Costanzi

1980–1982: Donald H. Walwyn-James

1982–1987: George P. Xuereb

1987–1988: Peter Serracino Inglott

1988–1991: Edwin Borg Costanzi

1991–1996: Peter Serracino Inglott

1996–2006: Roger Ellul-Micallef

== 21st century ==
2006–2016: Juanito Camilleri

2016–present: Alfred J. Vella
