= Charles Knevitt =

British journalist and author

Charles Knevitt

Charles Knevitt (10 August 1952 in Dayton, Ohio, USA – 14 March 2016) was a British journalist (parents from the UK), author, broadcaster, curator and playwright, and former Architecture Correspondent of the Sunday Telegraph (1980–84) and The Times (1984–91). In 2016 he was made an Honorary Fellow of the Royal Institute of British Architects (RIBA) for his contribution to architecture.

In 1975 he coined the term 'community architecture' in an article in Building Design, and later wrote the definitive book on the subject for Penguin, with co-author Nick Wates (1987); it was reissued in the Routledge Revivals series (2013).

As director of the RIBA Trust (2004–11) he was responsible for bringing the first major exhibition on Le Corbusier in a generation to Liverpool and London; and loaned original work by Palladio in the RIBA Drawings Collection to touring exhibitions in Europe and the US.

In 2012–13 he performed his one-man show, 'Le Corbusier's Women', in London and New York. In 2008 Knevitt was named by Design Week as one of the 'Hot 50' making a difference in design.

== Television ==
In the mid-1980s he popularised coverage of contemporary architecture on television with the ‘Our London’ viewers’ poll of modern buildings for Thames Television (1984), to coincide with the 150th anniversary celebrations of the RIBA and its Festival of Architecture. The following year (1985) he was consultant on the six-part Anglia Television series for Channel 4, ‘Space on Earth’ and wrote the accompanying book. In 1987 he was the writer and presenter of an award-winning Granada Television programme in its 'New North' series.

== Books ==
He was the author/editor of 12 books. Among them is the top 20 best-seller, One's Life (1988), Perspectives (1986), and Shelter (1994; US edition 1996). The last of these raised more than £100,000 for Shelter – the National Campaign for Homeless People in the UK.

== RIBA Trust ==
=== Director of the RIBA Trust ===
Between 2004 and 2011 he was Director of the RIBA Trust, managing the cultural assets and delivering the public outreach programme of the Royal Institute of British Architects. The Trust included the British Architectural Library, more than four million items based at the RIBA and the Victoria and Albert Museum (V&A); the permanent Architecture Gallery at the V&A; the annual RIBA Stirling Prize for Architecture, broadcast live on Channel 4 and later BBC Two, with Kevin McCloud; the Royal Gold Medal and Honorary Fellowships; exhibitions; talks; and development.

=== Le Corbusier Exhibition and season ===
He was UK Director of the Vitra Design Museum travelling exhibition, 'Le Corbusier – The Art of Architecture' and season in Venice (Biennale), Liverpool (European Capital of Culture) and London (V&A, Barbican Art Gallery, RIBA and the Architectural Association), 2008–09.

=== Palladio Touring Exhibitions ===
There were also two touring Palladio exhibitions, based on original work in the RIBA Drawings Collection, in Europe (with the Royal Academy) and the USA.

== Other exhibitions ==
He curated several exhibitions in London, most recently 'Lifelines' at the European Commission's 12 Star Gallery (2012), with Emma Flynn and Cassandra Tsolakis; and in Malta, 'Richard England – Architect and Artist' for the Bank of Valletta (2013). The catalogue introduction was written by Renzo Piano.

== One-man show ==
In 2012 he wrote and performed his one-man show, 'Le Corbusier's Women', which premiered at Riverside Studios, Hammersmith, and subsequently performed it at Chelsea Arts Club, London, and Bowery Poetry Club, New York (2013). It is currently in development as a musical with Peter Manning, Concertmaster at the Royal Opera House, Covent Garden, and will be premiered at the Edinburgh International Festival Fringe (2014).

== Honorary positions ==
- Honorary Fellowship, Royal Institute of British Architects
- Patron, Invisible Structures, with Tim Burton, Helena Bonham Carter Carter
- Ambassador, Chelsea Arts Club Trust
- Chairman, Swiss Cultural Fund in Britain (now UK), 2007-14
- DCMS Working Party on the first UK City of Culture, 2013 (awarded to Derry)
- Co-Founder, First Wednesdays, Chelsea Arts Club
- Honorary Secretary, The Times/RIBA Community Enterprise Awards, under the patronage of the Prince of Wales
- Honorary Treasurer, The Architecture Club; International Building Press (UK)

== Bibliography ==
- Richard England – Architect and Artist (Exhibition Catalogue)(Malta: Bank of Valletta 2013) ISBN 978-99932-7-438-4
- 100 at 70: A Celebratory Album for Richard England – with Conrad Thake (Malta: MRSM 2007) ISBN 978-99932-0-553-1
- Shelter: Human Habitats from around the World (Streatley: Polymath Publishing 1994) ISBN 1-873224-04-4 (hardback); US Edition California: Pomegranate Artbooks 1996 ISBN 0-87654-600-9 (paperback)
- Seven Ages of the Architect: The very best of Louis Hellman 1967–92 (Streatley: Polymath Publishing 1991) ISBN 1-873224-02-8
- From Pecksniff to The Prince of Wales: 150 Years of Punch on Architecture, Planning and Development 1841–1991 (Streatley: Polymath Publishing 1990) ISBN 1-873224-01X
- The Responsive Office: People and Change – with Fiona Gorman and Chris Bown (Streatley: Polymath Publishing 1990) ISBN 1-873224-00-1
- One's Life: A Cartoon Biography of HRH The Prince of Wales (London: Michael Joseph 1988; reprinted before publication and Top 20 best-seller) ISBN 0-7181-3177-0
- Community Architecture: How People are creating their own Environment – with Nick Wates (London: Penguin, 1987) ISBN 0-14-010428-3; Japanese edition 1992; Chinese edition 1993
- Perspectives: An Anthology of 1001 Architectural Quotations (London: Lund Humphries 1986) ISBN 0-85331-511-6
- Space on Earth: Architecture – People and Buildings (London: Thames Methuen 1985) ISBN 0-423-01430-7 (hardback), ISBN 0-423-01440-4 (paperback), in association with the Anglia Television series for Channel 4
- Monstrous Carbuncles: A Cartoon Guide to Architecture (Exhibition Catalogue) (London: Lund Humphries/Faber-Castell 1985) ISBN 0-85331-501-9
- Connections: The Architecture of Richard England 1964–84 (London: Lund Humphries 1984) ISBN 0-85331-471-3
- Manikata: The Making of a Church (Malta: A Manikata Parish Church Publication 1980; reprinted 1986)

== Other publications ==
- A Remarkable Legacy: Architecture, in 12 Star Gallery - The First 10 Years 2010-15, European Union, ISBN 978-92-79-40231-9; PDF ISBN 978-92-79-40230-2
- Oasis of Peace: Dar il-Hanin Samaritan-with Richard England and others, (Preca, Malta 2015) ISBN 978-999-09-54-77-7
- Dome: Ralph Tubbs and the Festival of Britain – with Donald Smith and Jonathan Tubbs (Exhibition Catalogue)(London: CHELSEA Space 2012) ISBN 978-1-906203-63-4
- Le Corbusier – The Art of Architecture – with Alexander von Vegesack, Stanislaus von Moos, Arthur Ruegg, Mateo Kries and others (Exhibition Catalogue)(Weil am Rhine: Vitra Design Museum 2007, reprinted 2008) ISBN 978-3-931936-72-3; simultaneously published in German editions. Foreword and Essay ‘Life is right: Le Corbusier's British legacy’
- Mario Botta: Architetture Del Sacro – Prayers in Stone – with Mario Botta and others (Exhibition Catalogue)(Bologna: Editrice Compositori 2005) ISBN 88-7794-526-5
- Well Washed and Watered: The Story of Plumbing (Ripon: Polymath Publishing 1998)
- Fraxions – Photography + Architecture – with Richard England and Mario Pisani (Melfi: Libria – Mosaico 17 1995)
- The Story of Brick (Streatley: Polymath Publishing 1995)
- Britannic House: A Palace upon a Cliff – with Colin Amery (Streatley: Polymath Publishing 1991)
- Archi-Tetes Postcard Books, Calendars and Merchandising – by Louis Hellman (Streatley: Polymath Publishing 1991–93); Postcards ISBN 1-873224-03-6; US Edition California: Pomegranate Artbooks ISBN 1-56640-082-1
- Criticism in Architecture, Exploring Architecture in Islamic Cultures 3, The Aga Khan Award for Architecture, Concept Media Pte, Singapore, 1989, ISBN 981-00-0555-5. Seminar contribution ‘Where's the beef?’ The Criticism of Architecture in the Media, pp115–118
- Prince Charles and the Architectural Debate – with Christopher Martin and others (London: Architectural Design Profile 79 1989) ISBN 1-85490-021-8; US Edition St Martin's Press ISBN 0-312-04048-2
- Community Enterprise (London: The Times/Calouste Gulbenkian Foundation 1986)
- Articles in Architect, Architects’ Journal, Architectural Review, Building, Building Design, etc.; Daily Telegraph, Guardian, Yorkshire Post, Geographical, Men Only, Monocle, Private Eye, etc.; and various overseas newspapers and magazines.

== Recent papers ==
- ‘How to be a Genius’, International Association of Cultural and Creative Industries (Beijing), at the German Federal Ministry for Economic Affairs and Energy (BMWi), Berlin
- ‘On Giants’ Shoulders: Comparative Lives of Andrea Palladio and Le Corbusier’, 2016 Royal Gold Medal Masterclasses, RIBA, London; Malta Design Week, Valletta, 2014; European Commission UK, London, 2014; various UK schools of architecture
- ‘Toward an Architecture: The New Edition’, CorbusYear Conference, Warsaw, 2012; Chelsea Arts Club, London, 2009; Sunday Times Literary Festival, Oxford, 2009

== Alma mater ==
- University of Manchester (1971–75)
- Stonyhurst College (1963–71)
