= Parish Church of St Joseph, Manikata =

Parish Church of Saint Joseph
- Knisja Parrokkjali ta' San Ġużepp
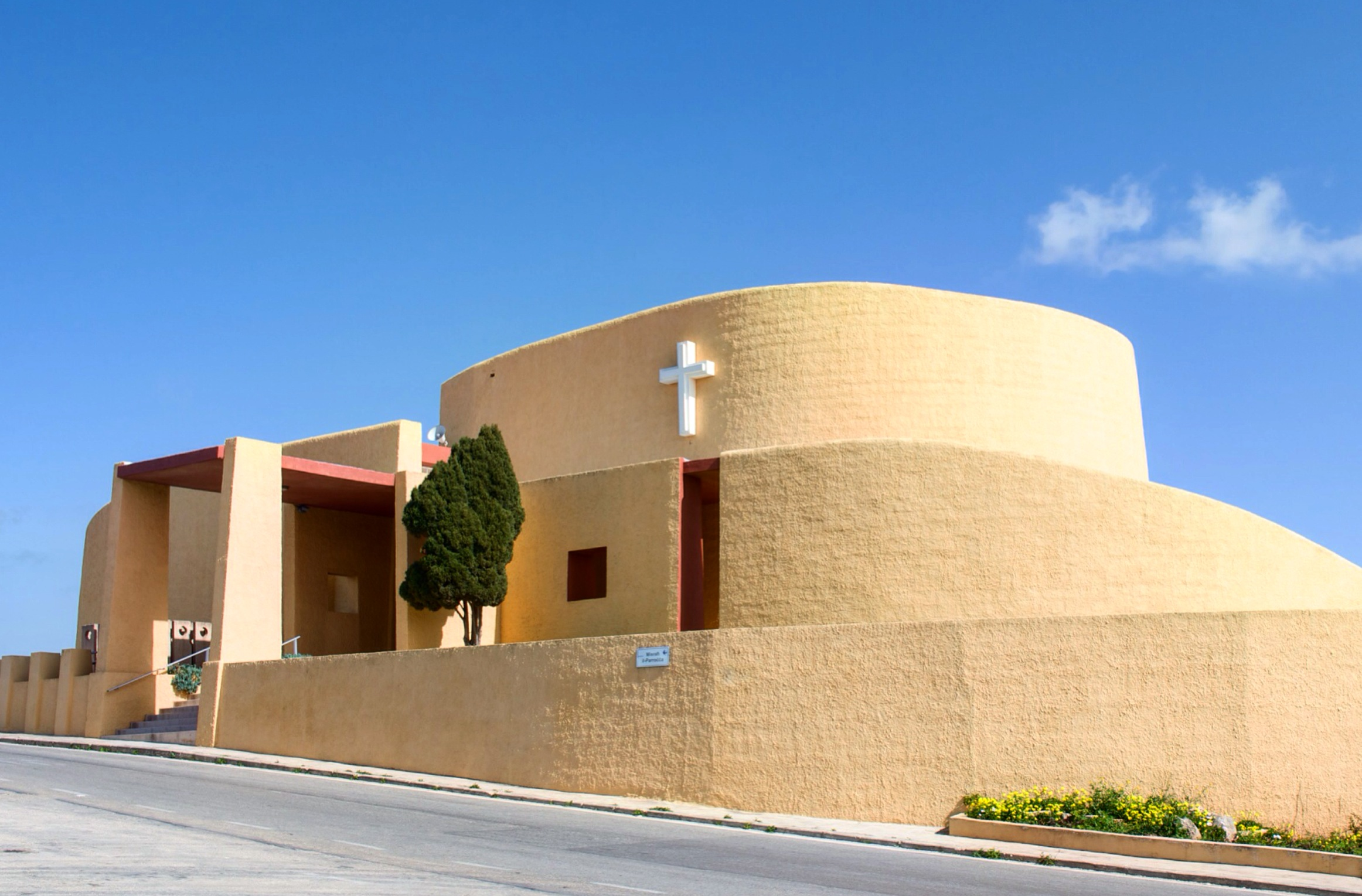
- The church in 2017
- Parish Church of Saint Joseph
- 35°56′29.51″N 14°21′11.05″E
- Location: Manikata, l/o Mellieħa
- Country: Malta
- Denomination: Roman Catholic

History
- Status: Parish church
- Dedication: Saint Joseph
- Consecrated: 17 February 1985

Architecture
- Functional status: Active
- Architect: Richard England
- Style: Critical regionalism
- Years built: 1964–1974
- Groundbreaking: 16 August 1964
- Completed: 29 November 1974

Specifications
- Capacity: 700

Administration
- Archdiocese: Malta

The Parish Church of Saint Joseph (Maltese: Knisja Parrokkjali ta' San Ġużepp) is an iconic Roman Catholic parish church in Manikata, Malta, dedicated to Saint Joseph. It was designed by Richard England in 1962, and it was built between 1964 and 1974. The church marks a break from traditional church building designs, and it is an example of Critical regionalism. Its form is inspired by the girna, a traditional corbelled stone hut.

== History ==
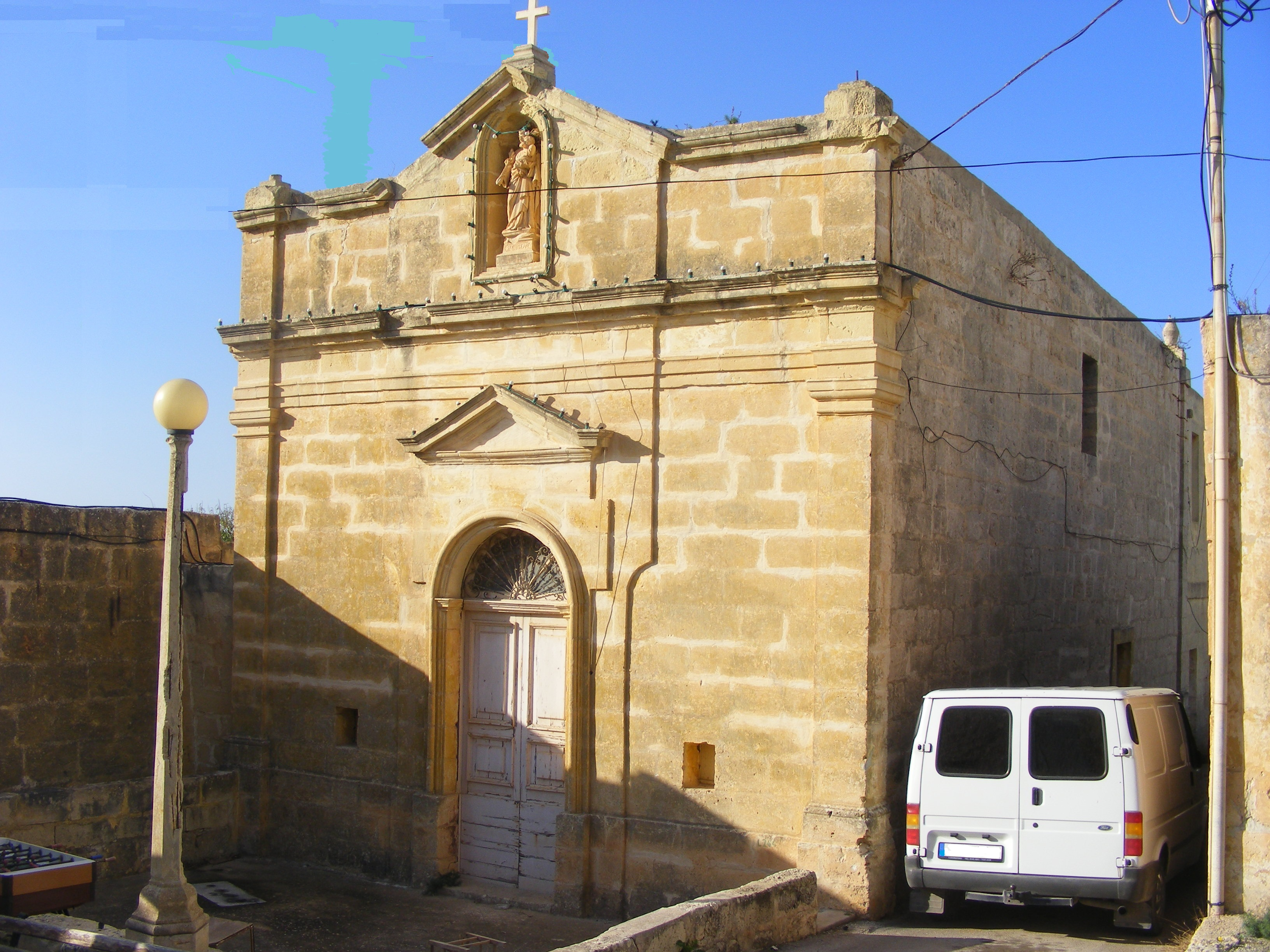
The old chapel of Manikata

The first church in the village of Manikata was a small chapel dedicated to St Joseph, built in 1918. By the mid-20th century, this was too small to cater for the village's growing population, and plans were made to enlarge the chapel. These proved to be impractical, so in 1961 it was decided to build a new and larger church at a different location.

The rector Manwel Grima asked the architect Edwin England Sant Fournier to make plans for the new church, but the latter entrusted the job to his son Richard England, making the church his first commission. England designed the building in 1962, at the time when the Second Vatican Council was causing reforms in the Catholic Church. These reforms aimed at modernizing the Church proved to be a source of inspiration for England's concept for the new church building. The new church building's capacity stood at 700.

The first stone was laid down by Archbishop Mikiel Gonzi on 16 August 1964, in the presence of Prime Minister George Borg Olivier and Minister Joseph Spiteri. The church's construction was marred by a restrictive budget of only £M20,000, a lack of skilled labourers, and the death of Grima in 1971. It was inaugurated by Archbishop Gonzi on 29 November 1974. It became a parish church on 16 February 1975, and it was consecrated by Archbishop Joseph Mercieca on 17 February 1985.

The church was scheduled as a Grade 1 building in 2011.

== Architecture ==
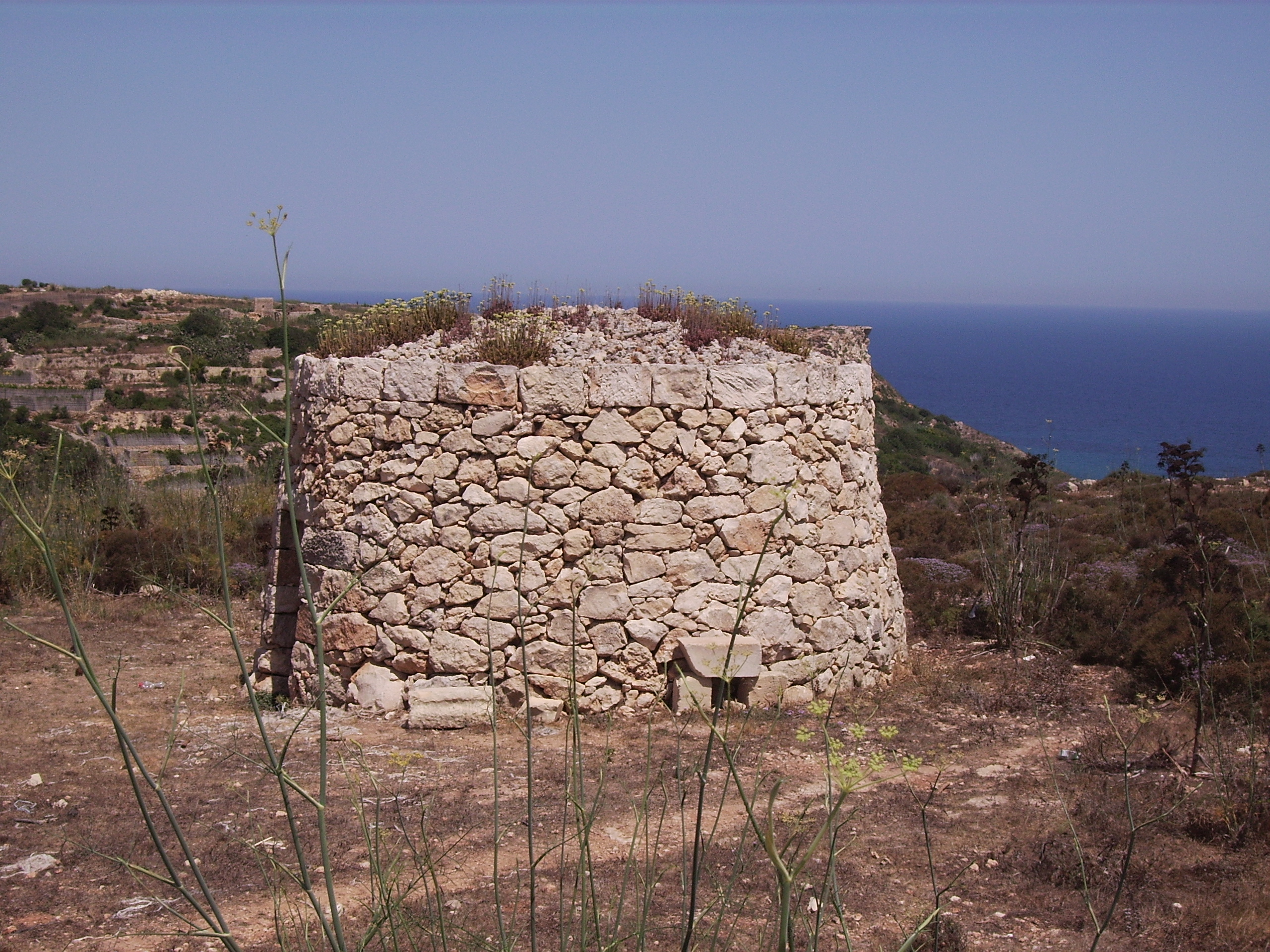
The design of the church shows inspiration from the traditional girna

The Manikata church is amongst the innovative churches in Malta. It broke away from traditional Baroque church designs, and England's concept was derived from site specific conditions relating to critical regionalism, along with a desire to mirror the then-ongoing reforms in the Catholic Church.

The church consists of curving walls, which are meant to create an element of intimacy, and their configuration recalls the Megalithic Temples of Malta. Another source of inspiration is the Notre Dame du Haut chapel by Le Corbusier, which also broke away from more conservative church designs in favour of sculptural forms. The overall form of England's church is inspired by an abstracted interpretation of the girna, a type of traditional corbelled stone hut common in rural Malta.

The church is aimed to capture both human spirituality along with the peace associated with the natural environment surrounding it.
