= Today Public Policy Institute =

Maltese think tank

- Abbreviation: TPPI
- Formation: 2007
- Dissolved: 2018
- Type: Independent think tank
- Headquarters: Valletta
- Director General: Joseph V. Tabone
- Website: www.tppi.org.mt

The Today Public Policy Institute (TPPI) was a Maltese Think tank. It was not affiliated to any political party or movement. It received sponsorship and financial support from a variety of sources including Atlas Insurance, the Bank of Valletta, Mediatoday Ltd, and the Malta Council for Economic and Social Development.

It produced reports and arranged conferences on a wide range of topics including:

- Public health and transport (December 2015)
- Constitutional Reform (September 2014)
- Water (April 2015)

It was managed by a 15 member board. Peter Serracino Inglott was one of the founders. An award for Civic Engagement was established by the institute in his memory. The Migrant Offshore Aid Station was the first winner, awarded by the President of the Republic at the Verdala Palace in November 2015.

In 2018, the Today Public Policy Institute announced its closure.
