= Malta University Historical Society =

Historical organization in Malta

== About MUHS ==
The Malta University Historical Society (MUHS) is an undergraduate and graduate student organisation based at the University of Malta, it aims to represent the student body of the History Department and organise events and activities. It is one of the most active organisations at the University.

== History ==
MUHS was founded by Andrew P. Vella in 1963, making it one of Malta's oldest student organisations. Throughout the years, the Organisation has grown significantly and produced notable alumni. Tours, social events, food tasting, and more, are organised. The organisation is also known for publishing the journal 'Storja' which was first published in 1978. The latest edition of Storja was published in 2023.

== Aims ==
-To promote the study of history among students and public. -To spread information on sustainable development and cultural developments. -To be the voice of all students in the History Department at the University of Malta.

== Activism ==
The Society has posted many statements against overdevelopment and destructing historic sites. One of the most notable being the statement on Fort Chambray which was spread on various media sites.

== Presidents ==
2024- :Julia Camilleri

== Summary ==
The society facilitates collaboration between undergraduate and graduate history students disseminating information relating to the Discipline and to make representations on behalf of History students in Malta.
