= Għajn Żnuber Tower =

- Torri ta' Għajn Żnuber
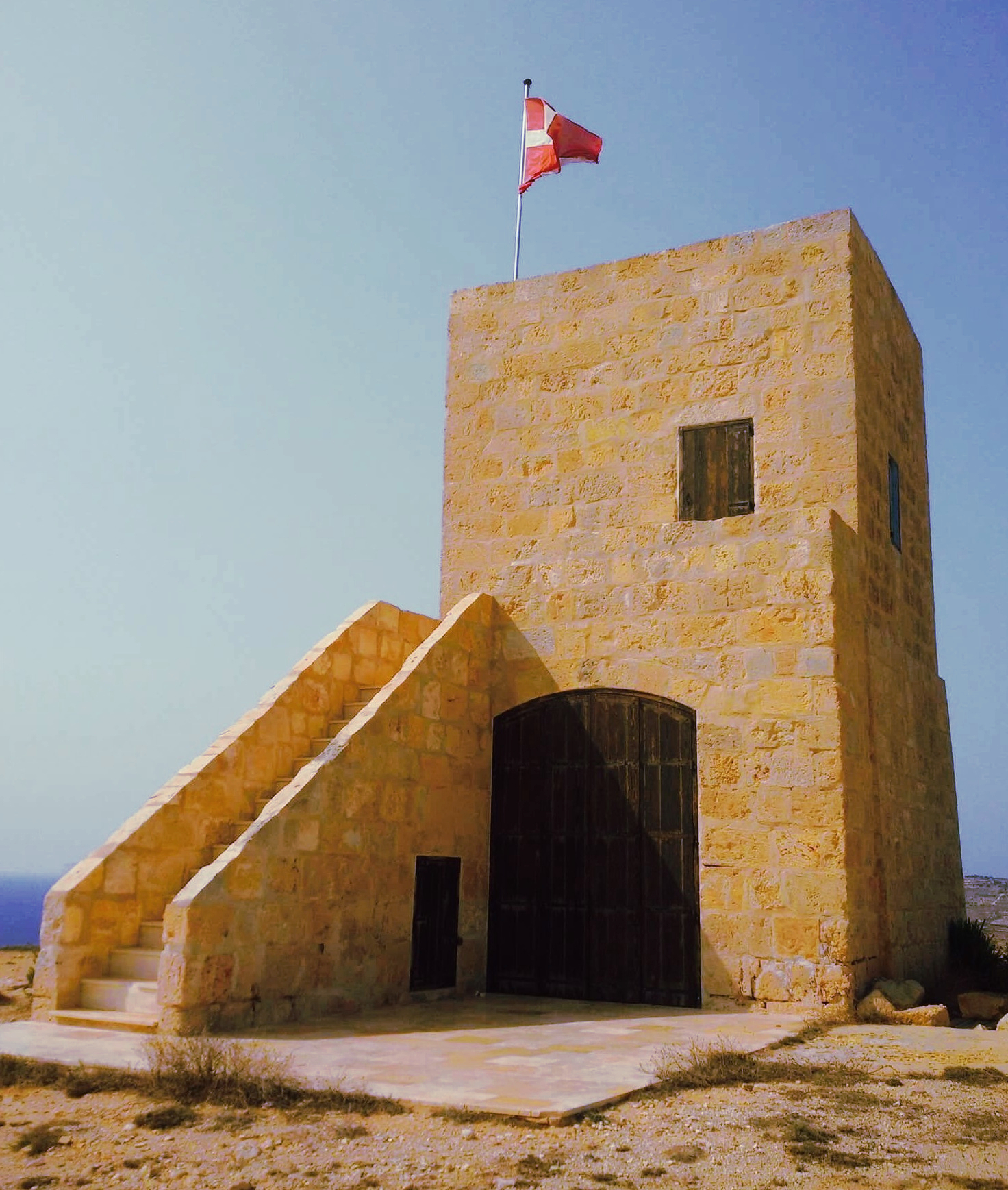
- View of Għajn Żnuber Tower
- Alternative names: Ta' Ciantar Tower

General information
- Status: Intact
- Type: Farmstead or hunting lodge
- Architectural style: Traditional Maltese
- Location: Mellieħa, Malta
- Coordinates: 35°57′0.17″N 14°20′36.25″E
- Completed: c. 19th century
- Renovated: before 1902; 2012 (restoration)

Technical details
- Material: Limestone
- Floor count: 2

Għajn Żnuber Tower (Maltese: Torri ta' Għajn Żnuber), also known as Ta' Ciantar Tower (Maltese: Torri ta' Ciantar), is a rural structure in the limits of Mellieħa, Malta. It was likely built in the 19th century as a farmstead or hunting lodge, and it later served as an anti-smuggling post and a coastal lookout position. The building was restored in 2012 after part of it had collapsed, and it is now a visitor centre of Il-Majjistral Nature and History Park.

== History ==
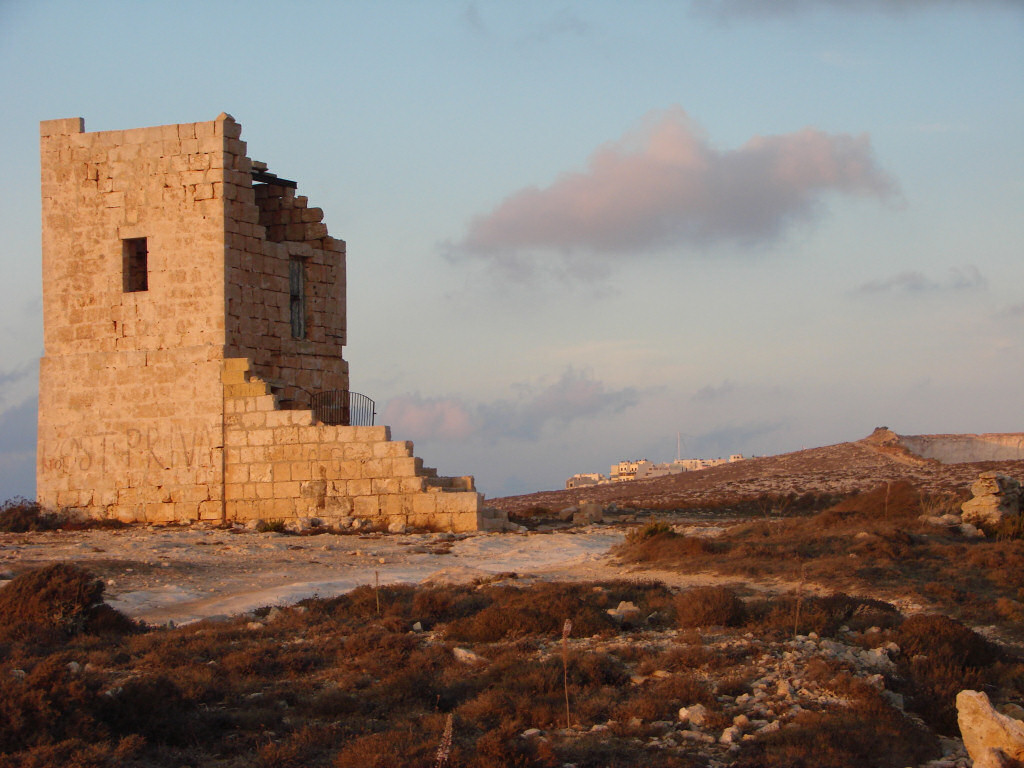
Għajn Żnuber Tower in 2007, prior to restoration

The date of construction and original use of Għajn Żnuber Tower is not known. It was suggested that the structure was a militia watchtower built by the Università whilst Malta was under the rule of the Order of St. John, but its location does not feature on any lists of militia watch posts, and the structure does not look like it was built for defence purposes.

It is now believed that the structure was a farmstead or a hunting lodge, which was probably constructed sometime during the 19th century. The structure was modified extensively sometime before 1902.

The turret is known to have been used as an anti-smuggling post during the 19th century. It was also used as a lookout post by the Northern Infantry Brigade during World War II. The building was abandoned after the war, and it fell in disrepair and was subsequently vandalised.

=== Restoration ===
Il-Majjistral Nature and History Park was established in 2007, and the turret fell within the limits of the park. By this time, the structure was in ruins with part of its roof having collapsed.

By 2009, the Maltese government was making attempts to expropriate the structure from its owners, and the NGO Din l-Art Ħelwa had gathered funds in order to restore it and turn it into a visitor centre. Fondazzjoni Wirt Artna also called for the tower's restoration.

The turret was eventually restored by the Government's Restoration Unit in 2012. Throughout the course of restoration, the entire south façade was dismantled and rebuilt, whilst the concrete staircase was demolished and replaced by one built out of limestone.

== Architecture ==
Għajn Żnuber Tower is a limestone building which is two stories high and has thin walls. The south façade contains the main doorway on the ground floor, and it also has an external staircase leading to the top floor.
