= Edwin England Sant Fournier =

Maltese architect (1908–1969)

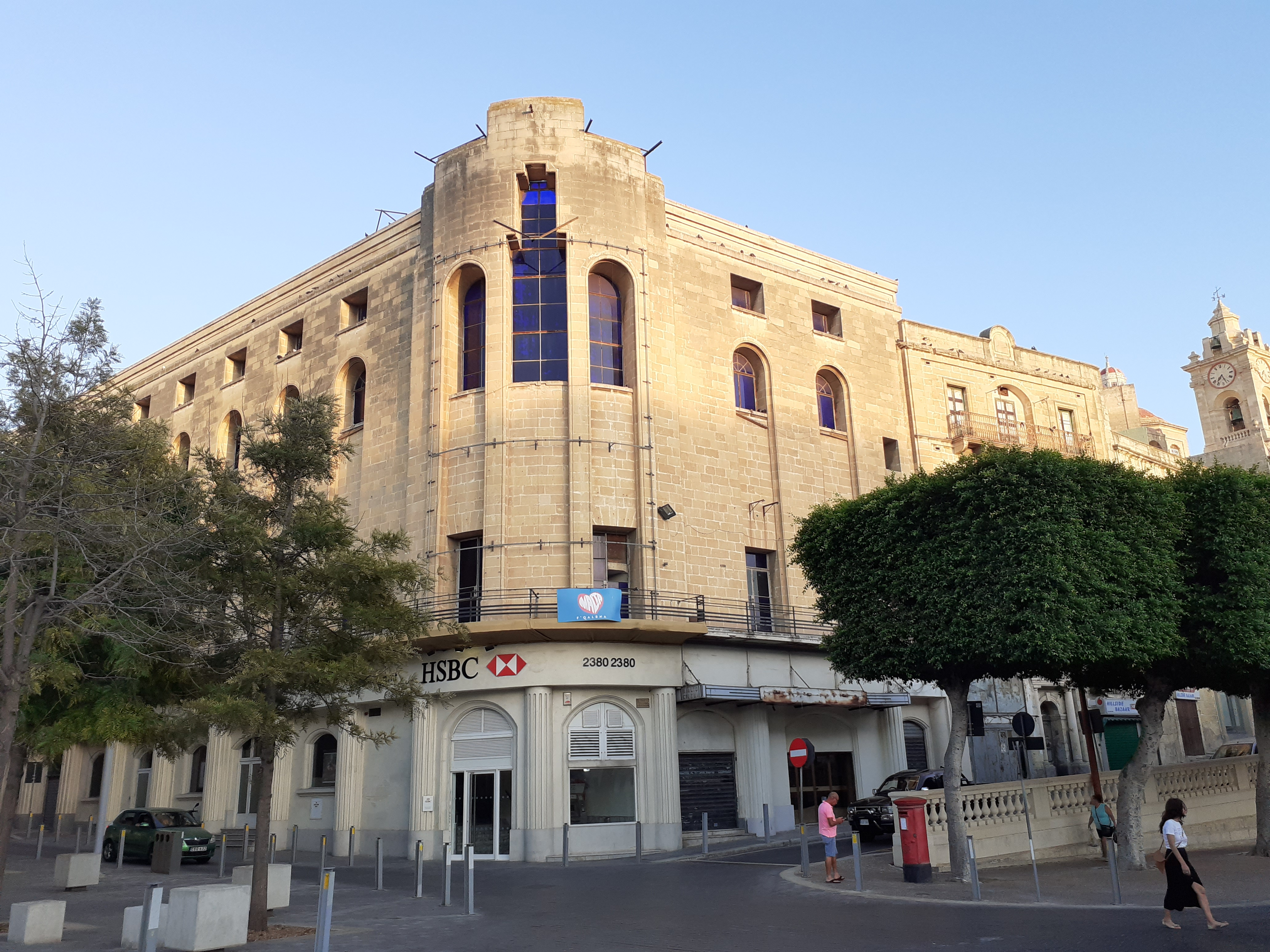
Cinema Rialto, Bormla

Edwin England Sant Fournier (1908–1969) was a Maltese architect.

He married the Marchesa Adeline Cassar Desain, with whom he fathered Richard England.

== Rialto Cinema in Cospicua ==
His main work is deemed to be the Rialto Cinema in Bormla (Cospicua), designed in Art Moderne style. According to Mark G. Muscat, it is "renowned for the extensive use of rich blue ultramarine stained glass and the vertical arched openings, all relating to the Art Deco aesthetic movement that was prominent in the United States throughout the 1930s and the 1940s. The classical triangular pediment was by now replaced by a simplified quadrilateral structure.

"This large, streamlined but stylish building was one of the most popular venues of its time. It was built for Cinemascope widescreen features with stereophonic sound." The Rialto Cinema was disbanded in 1988 and is now owned by the Malta Labour Party. It is under Grade 2 scheduling protection since 2010.

== Other works ==
England Sant Fournier also authored:

- the Pandora Theatre in Zejtun (1950–1955)
- Joinwell factory and offices in Mill Street, Qormi
- Barclays Bank DCO in Tower Road / High Street Sliema, built in the early 1950s and demolished in 1964. The replacement building was to be built by Richard England. "The original building contained an interesting interplay of concave and convex forms, which were comparable to Italian examples of the 1930s, most notably Giuseppe Capponi's (1893–1936) Palazzina Nebbiosi in Rome."
