= University of Malta =

Public university in Malta

- L-Università ta' Malta
- The Msida campus, seen in September 2026
- Former names: Collegium Melitense (1592–1768); Pubblica Università di Studi Generali (1769–1798); École Centrale (1798–1800); Royal University of Malta (1937–1974)
- Motto: Ut Fructificemus Deo (Latin)
- Motto in English: "We should bring forth fruit unto God"
- Type: Public
- Established: 12 November 1592; 433 years ago
- Founder: Manuel Pinto da Fonseca
- Affiliations: EUA, EAN, ACU, Utrecht Network, SGroup, CGU, EUCEN, ISEP
- Chancellor: David J. Attard
- Rector: Frank Bezzina
- Academic staff: 961.5 (as of 2016–17)
- Administrative staff: 930 (as of 2016–17)
- Students: ~13,000 (Oct. 2026)
- Location: Tal-Qroqq, Msida, Malta; 35°54′8″N 14°29′1″E
- Campus: Urban
- Language: English
- Sporting affiliations: Malta University Sports Club
- Website: www.um.edu.mt

The University of Malta (Maltese: L-Università ta' Malta; UM; formerly UOM) is a public research university in the towns of Msida and Valletta, Malta. It serves as Malta's flagship and national university.

It offers undergraduate bachelor's degrees, postgraduate master's degrees and postgraduate doctorates. It is a member of the European University Association, the European Access Network, Association of Commonwealth Universities, the Utrecht Network, the Santander Network, the Compostela Group, the European Association for University Lifelong Learning (EUCEN) and the International Student Exchange Programme (ISEP).

In post-nominals the university's name is abbreviated as Melit; a shortened form of Melita (a Latinised form of the Greek Μελίτη).

== History ==
The precursor to the University of Malta was the Collegium Melitense, a Jesuit college which was set up on 12 November 1592. This was originally located in an old house in Valletta, but a purpose-built college was constructed between 1595 and 1597. This building is now known as the Old University Building or the Valletta Campus.

The Jesuits were expelled from Malta in 1768, and although their property was taken over by the Treasury of the Order of St. John, the college remained open and professors retained their posts. The University of Malta officially came to existence on 22 November 1769, when Grand Master Manuel Pinto da Fonseca signed a decree constituting a Pubblica Università di Studi Generali. The university was briefly suspended during the magistracy of Francisco Ximénez de Tejada in the 1770s, but it was reconstituted by his successor Emmanuel de Rohan-Polduc in 1779.

The university was replaced by the École Centrale during the French occupation of Malta from 1798 to 1800, but was once again reopened by the British in the early 19th century. From 1937 to 1974, the institution was known as the Royal University of Malta.

Over time, the Valletta campus became too small and Evans Laboratories (now known as Evans Building) was built in 1959 to house the Faculty of Science. In 1968, the Medical School moved to a building near St. Luke's Hospital in Gwardamanġa. The university opened a much larger campus at Tal-Qroqq in Msida in the late 1960s, but it retained the Valletta building which is still used for some lectures and conferences.

The university is a member of the European University Association, the European Access Network, the Association of Commonwealth Universities, the Utrecht Network, the Santander Network, the Compostela Group, the European Association for University Lifelong Learning (EUCEN) the International Student Exchange Programme (ISEP) and the Excellence Network of Island Universities [RETI]. The university has participated in EU programmes and has won several projects in collaboration with partner universities. University of Malta staff and students participate in programmes such as Erasmus and Leonardo.

The university acts as a partner with other institutions. Links have been forged with the Chamber of Commerce, Enterprise & Industry and the Employment & Training Corporation in order to determine how the university, industry, business and the public sector can develop links.

== Campuses ==
=== Msida campus ===
The Gateway Building, the main entrance to the Msida campus, in 2026

The main campus of the University of Malta is located in an area known as Tal-Qroqq in Msida. It has a total area of 250,207 m^{2} (2,693,210 sq ft), and it houses most of the university's faculties, centres and institutions.

The square below the library at the Msida campus, known as the Quadrangle, pictured in 2026

Plans to construct this campus began in the late 1950s after the university's original premises in Valletta were deemed too small. Designs for the new campus were prepared by the British architectural practice Norman and Dawbarn in 1961, and the Maltese architectural firm Mortimer and de Giorgio was also involved in the project. The foundation stone of the campus was laid down on 22 September 1964, a day after Malta's independence, by Commonwealth Secretary Duncan Sandys and construction was completed by 1970. The design was inspired by American college campuses, and it contains separate buildings for each faculty, along with a library and a University House, surrounded by a ring road. One of the most significant buildings in the university campus is the former Department of Architecture Building (now known as the Ġużè Cassar Pullicino Building), a Brutalist building designed by the British architect Peter Richardson and built in 1969–70.

The university campus has been extended several times since its original construction in the late 1960s. A Catholic chapel dedicated to St Thomas More was added in 1977–78, and it was built to designs of the architect Lino Gatt, with the architect William Micallef supervising its construction. In the late 1980s the architect Richard England was commissioned to design a new masterplan for the university, and he designed a number of new Postmodern buildings, many of which are linked together with colonnades, arcades, stairs or ramps. This extension was built between 1989 and 1999, and its most significant component is the Gateway Building which serves as the university's main entrance.

The residence buildings for students and urban Northern Malta in the background, seen in 2026

The Faculty of ICT is housed in a steel-and-glass building which was constructed between 2009 and 2013. A masterplan for future development of the campus has been prepared, and it includes a proposed Sustainable Living Complex which would house the Faculty for the Built Environment. A building which will serve as accommodation for university students is currently under construction in an area between the main campus and Mater Dei Hospital, after it was approved by the Planning Authority in 2018.

The International Maritime Law Institute (IMLI) is located within the grounds of the university's Msida campus even though it is a separate educational institution.

==== Campus Hub ====
Campus Hub, a plaza, is the commercial capital of the Msida campus, housing many restaurants and other businesses; it is also the site of the coloured residence buildings for students.

Views of Campus Hub, shot in September 2026

Residence buildings seen from inside Campus Hub

A scene nearby the Starbucks outlet

The area nearby the entrance

=== Valletta campus ===
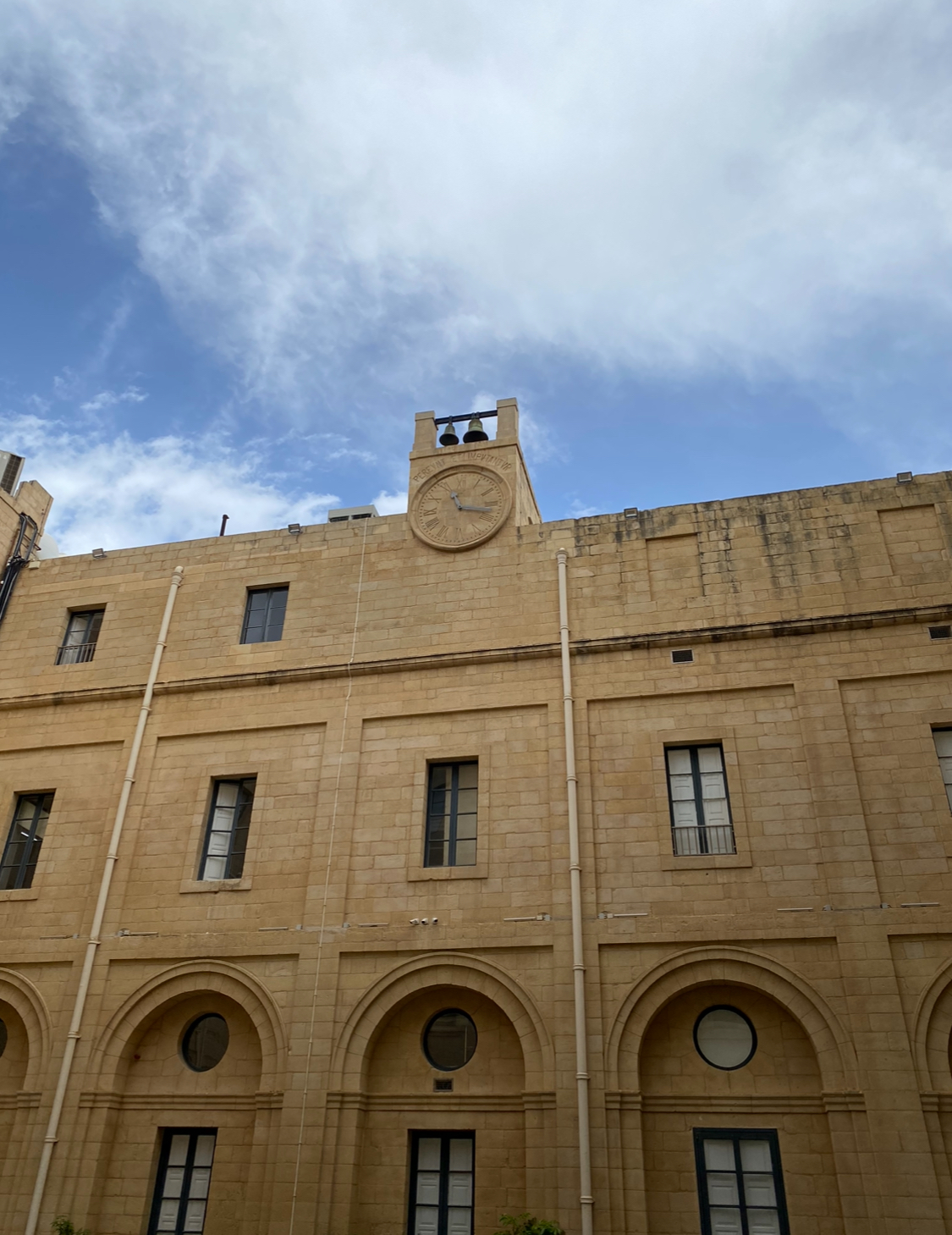
Courtyard at the Valletta Campus

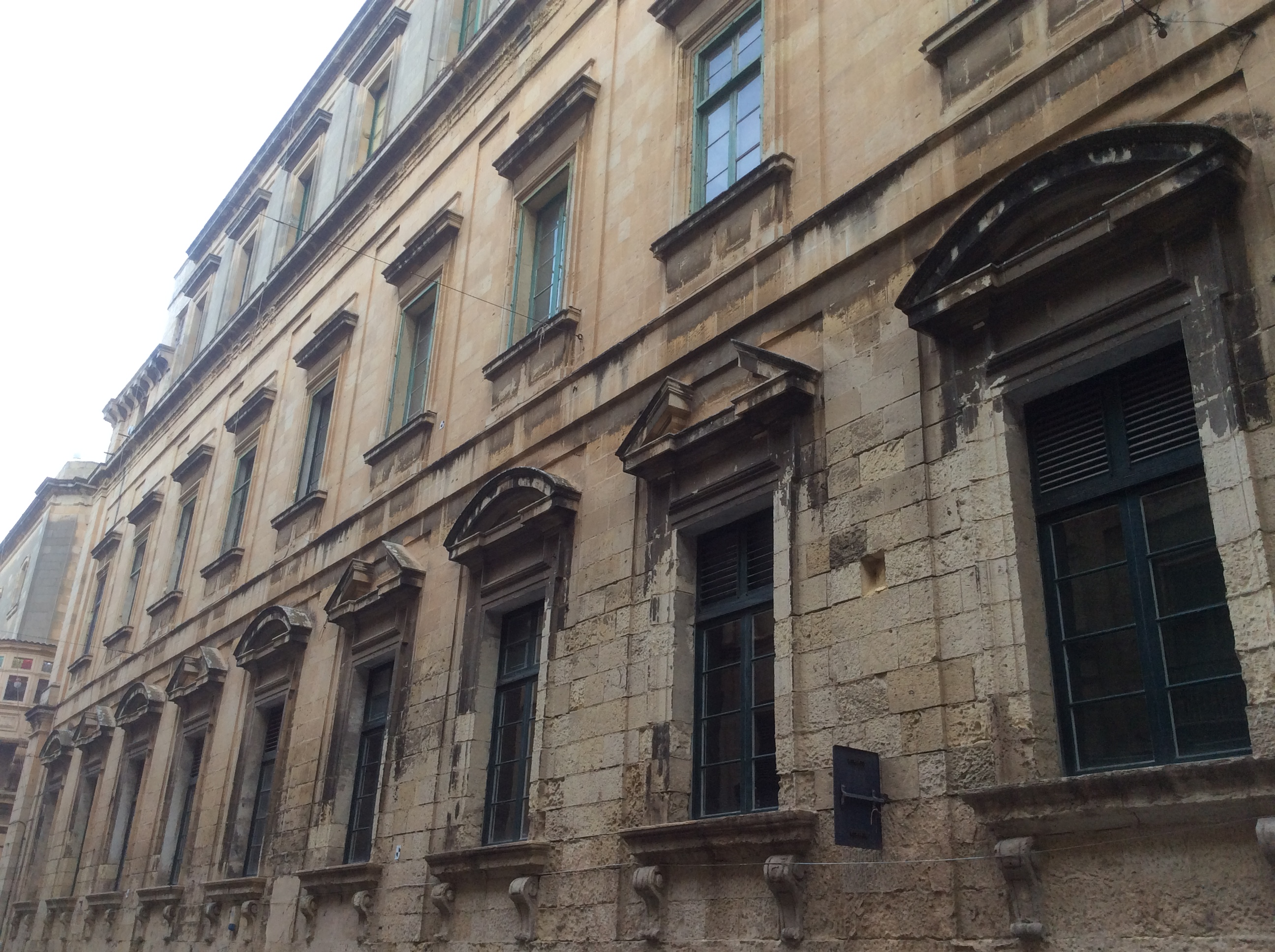
The Old University Building in Valletta

The Valletta campus is the university's original campus, located in Malta's capital city. It is housed in the Old University Building, which was constructed between 1595 and 1602 to house the university's predecessor, the Collegium Melitense. The Valletta campus incorporates an Aula Magna ("Great Hall").

The campus is used to host events such as international conferences and seminars, along with a number of short courses and summer schools. It currently houses the Research, Innovation & Development Trust (RIDT), the Conferences & Events Unit, the Centre for the Study & Practice of Conflict Resolution, and the Valletta Campus Library.

=== Marsaxlokk campus ===
The Marsaxlokk campus houses the university's Institute for Sustainable Energy. It has an area of about 7,000 m^{2} (75,000 sq ft) and it includes two laboratories and a lecture room.

=== Gozo campus ===
The University of Malta Gozo Campus, formerly known as the University of Malta Gozo Centre, is located in Xewkija on the island of Gozo and it was established in 1992. It is used for part-time degrees, diplomas and short-term courses, and it also serves as a centre for assisting Gozitan students who are enrolled in courses at the university's campuses on Malta.

The Gozo campus also houses the Güsten Atmospheric Research Centre, which forms part of the within the Faculty of Science's Department of Geosciences. Lectures, seminars and other social or cultural activities for the general public are also held at the campus.

== Organisation and administration ==
The Msida campus main library, in 2026

The administrative set up of the university consists of academic and administrative and technical staff members who are appointed or elected to the governing bodies of the university. The principal officers of the university are the Chancellor, the Pro-Chancellor, the Rector, the Pro-Rectors, the Secretary, the Registrar, the Deans of the Faculties as well as the Finance Officer and the Librarian. The main governing bodies are the council, the Senate and the Faculty Boards.

As the supreme governing body of the university, the council is responsible for the administration of the university. Faculties group together departments concerned with a major area of knowledge, while institutes are of an interdisciplinary nature. The council is also responsible for appointing staff members to academic posts.

The senate is largely responsible for the academic matters of the university primarily regulating studies, research, documentation and examinations at the university. The senate also establishes the entry regulations. The faculty board directs the academic tasks of the faculty. The board presents plans and proposals to the senate and the council. Besides, it determines the studies, teaching and research within the faculty.

Three sites at the University House in the Msida campus: the merchandise shop, the canteen, and the students' council (KSU) office

The present rector is Frank Bezzina, formerly the dean of the Faculty of Economics, Management and Accountancy. He was sworn into office in June 2026 to succeed Alfred J. Vella, who had served for ten years. Vella's administration rebranded the university for the fall semester of 2017 with a stylized version of the logo that removed the Latin motto Ut Fructificemus Deo ("We should bring forth fruit unto God") for daily use and retained it in a version to be used in ceremonial contexts; some academics spoke out against this change.

=== Malta University Holding Company ===
The Malta University Holding Company Ltd (MUHC) embodies the commercial interests of the University of Malta. The companies comprised in the Holding Company serve as the commercial interface between the University of Malta and the business community, brokering the resources and assets of the university to provide added value through commercial activity.

Companies within the group are: Malta University Broadcasting; Malta University Consulting Ltd; Malta University Laboratory Services; Malta University Language School; Malta University Publishing; Malta University Residence; Malta University Sports & Leisure; Hotel Kappara.

== Academic profile ==
The Engineering Research and Innovation Laboratories in Msida

The university has fourteen faculties, a number of institutes and centres, and three schools. (Note: The faculties are: Arts; Built Environment; Dental Surgery; Economics, Management & Accountancy; Education; Engineering; Health Sciences; Information & Communication Technology; Laws; Media & Knowledge Sciences; Medicine & Surgery; Science; Social Wellbeing and Theology.) The floor area occupied by the library building is between 5,000 m^{2} (54,000 sq ft) and 6,000 m^{2} (65,000 sq ft). A collection of one million volumes is housed throughout the Main Library, branches and institutes. The library subscribes to 60,000 e-journals, 308 print journal titles and a collection of e-books. 931 courses are offered, as of the scholastic year of 2026/27.

The Department of Metallurgy and Materials Engineering Laboratories in Msida

Interdisciplinary institutes and centres have been set up. (Note: The institutes include: Aerospace Technologies; Anglo-Italian Studies; Baroque Studies; Climate Change & Sustainable Development; Confucius; Digital Games; Earth Systems; the Edward de Bono Institute for the Design & Development of Thinking; European Studies; Islands & Small States; Linguistics; Maltese Studies; Mediterranean Academy of Diplomatic Studies; Mediterranean Institute; Physical Education & Sport; Public Administration & Management; Space Sciences & Astronomy; Sustainable Energy; Tourism, Travel & Culture. The centres are: the Centre for Biomedical Cybernetics; Centre for English Language Proficiency; Centre for Entrepreneurship and Business Incubation; Centre for Environmental Education and Research; Centre for Labour Studies; Centre for Literacy; Centre for the Liberal Arts & Sciences; Centre for Molecular Medicine & Biobanking; Centre for Resilience & Socio-Emotional Health and the Euro-Mediterranean Centre for Educational Research.)

The Institute for Physical Education and Sport and nearby swimming pool in Msida

The university has also set up a School of Performing Arts.

The Cottonera Resource Centre acts as a hub that co-ordinates links between communities in the inner harbour area and the university, facilitating resource-transfer and capacity building.

There is a University of the Third Age.

The Institute of Space Sciences and Astronomy operates the Nadur Observatory in Gozo.

== Student body and admissions ==
As of October 2026, over 13,000 students were enrolled in the university, around 2,000 of whom are international. In the scholastic year of 2026/27 alone, more than 2,500 students enlisted to follow an undergraduate course, and some 2,200 applied to continue studying at a postgraduate level; around 350 Erasmus students and 500 visiting students joined. A basic Foundation Studies Course enables international high school students who have completed their secondary or high school education overseas but who do not have the necessary entry requirements, to qualify for admission to an undergraduate degree course. Over 3,000 students graduate annually.

Admission to the university is based on matriculation examination results (A levels). Grades are awarded on a seven-point scale: Grade 1 is awarded for the highest level of achievement, whereas Grade 7 indicates the minimum satisfactory performance. However, entry on basis of maturity and experience is granted for certain courses in the arts and sciences. The Faculty of Dental Surgery allows for a maximum of six European students per year chosen according to merit and only after the students have passed an admissions interview.

Full-time undergraduate courses are free-of-charge to citizens of Malta and the European Union. Maltese students enrolled in higher education in Malta are entitled to a stipend. Fees are charged in the case of higher courses and to nationals from non-EU states. There are 600 international students studying at the university, constituting around 7% of the student population.

There are a further 2,500 pre-tertiary students at the Ġ. F. Abela Junior College, which is also managed by the university.

== Student life ==
=== Student societies ===
The 2026 Freshers' Week at the Msida campus, an annual event held in October to welcome new and returning students to the university

Student societies include the University Students' Council (Maltese: Kunsill Studenti Universitarji, KSU), the Malta Medical Students' Association (MMSA), an association of students in the faculty of Medicine and Surgery, and the Society of Architects and Civil Engineering Students (SACES), an association of students in the faculty of the Built Environment. The most prominent student society for the Faculty of Laws is Għaqda Studenti tal-Liġi (GħSL), which is 80 years old. It has notable legal alumni. Students of the Department of History also have a society, The Malta University Historical Society or MUHS. The society was founded by Professor Andrew Vella in 1963, making it one of the oldest societies at the university. It is one of the most active organisations in university and it organises multiple events, lectures, and activities including two yearly memorial lectures, tours and food tasting. They are also renowned for their activism, and their statement on Fort Chambray was shared on multiple media platforms.

== Rankings ==
=== The Times Higher Education ===
The Times Higher Education (THE) World University Rankings (WUR) uses eighteen indicators to provide comparative rankings of a university's performance; these indicators are grouped into five areas by weight: 1) teaching (29.5%) – the learning environment; 2) research environment (29%) – volume, income and reputation; 3) research quality (30%) – citation impact, research strength, research excellence and research influence, 4) international outlook (7.5%) – staff, students and research; 5) industry (4%) – income and patents. The University of Malta's ranking results over the years are listed:

2020: 601-800 of 1,396, 2021: 601-800 of 1,527, 2022: 801-1000 of 1,662, 2023: 801-1000 of 1,799, 2024: 801-1000 of 1,907, 2025: 801-1000 of 2,092, 2026: 801-1000 of 2,191.

== See also ==
- List of rectors of the University of Malta
- Malta University Historical Society
- Ġ. F. Abela Junior College
- List of early modern universities in Europe
