= Majjistral Park =

Nature reserve in Mellieha, Malta

Coordinates: 35.946°N 14.339°E

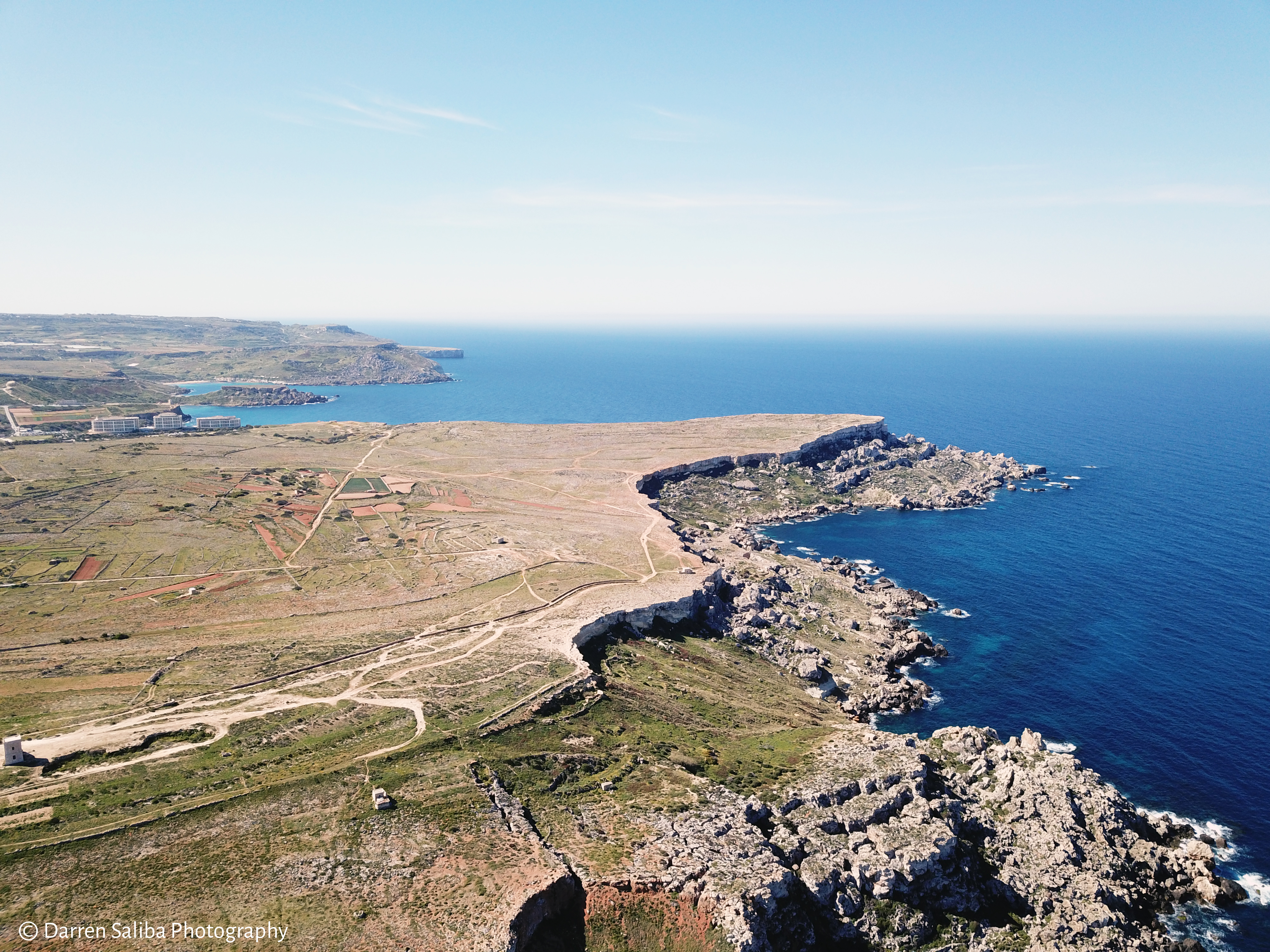
Il-Majjistral Nature and History Park

The Majjistral Nature and History Park is a nature reserve in Mellieha, Malta. The geographic area includes the coastal area in Golden Bay (Maltese: Il-Mixquqa) to Il-Prajjet and Ix- Xagħra l-Ħamra. It was declared a national park in the Malta Government Gazette by Legal Notice 251 of 2007 in September 2007. The park is named for the northwestern region or wind (Maltese: Majjistral).

The area includes a stretch of 6 kilometres (3.7 mi) of protected coast, designated as part of a larger Special Area of Conservation of International Importance, within the Natura 2000 network of sites as per the European Habitats Directive. It has a number of historic and archaeological sites as identified in studies commissioned by the Malta Tourism Authority.

== Habitats ==
The Maltese Islands have a variety of habitats that are inhabited by diverse wild native plants. Some plants in the park are also endemic (found only in the Maltese islands), sub-endemic (found also in a few other Mediterranean regions), while others are scarce, localised or rare. While strolling in the Majjistral Park it is possible to observe the local environment, represented by a wide range of plants found in the different habitats: sand dunes, boulder scree, cliffs, rocky steppes and clay slopes, garrigue, temporary freshwater rock pools and maquis shrubland. The best period to observe some of the species found in the park is the time of flowering — which for the majority of them extends from late winter to spring. Plants, in particular the endemic ones, are an intrinsic part of Malta's heritage and their preservation demands striking a constant balance between human presence and nature protection.

== Indigenous flora and fauna ==
=== Flora ===
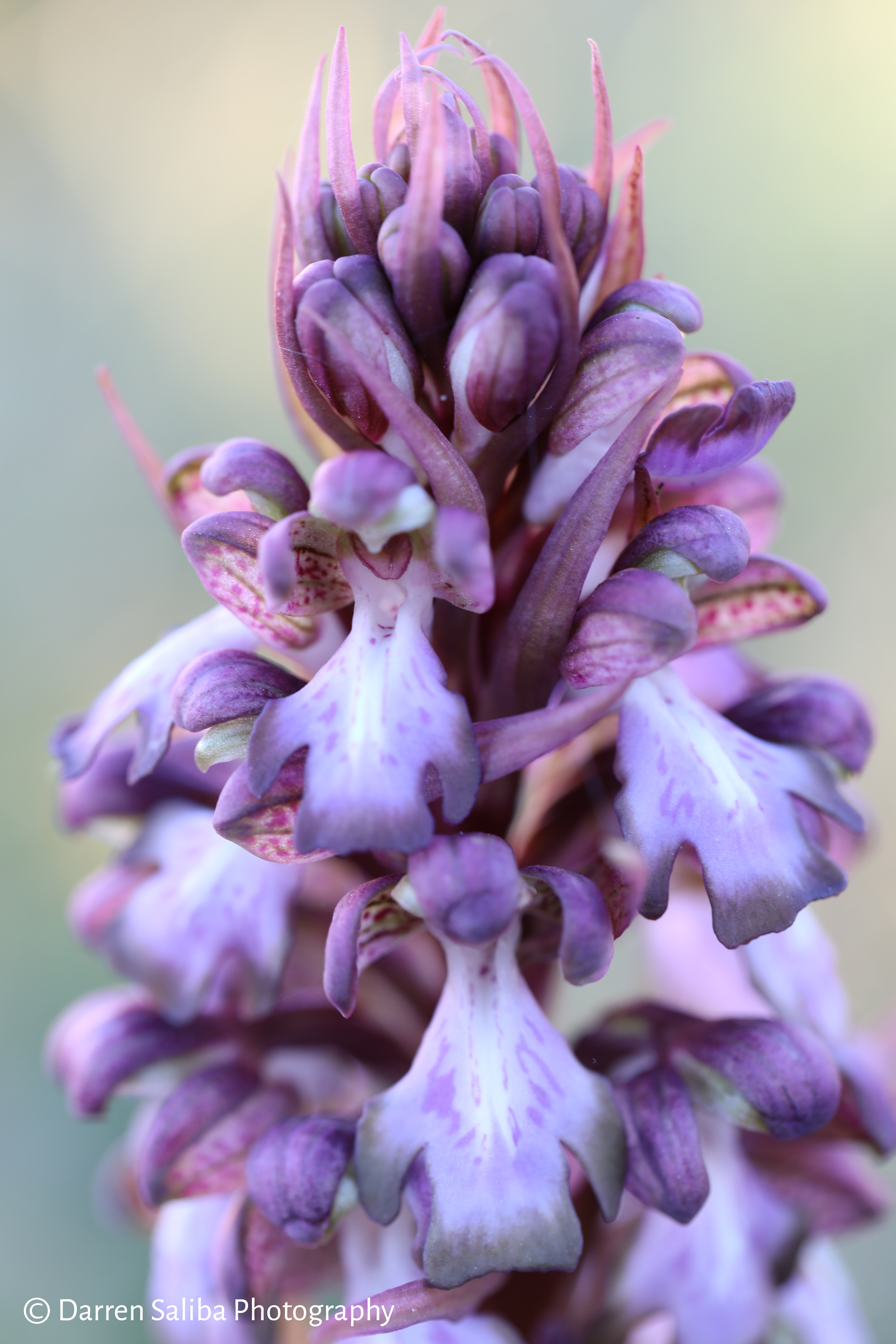
Flora at Il-Majjistral Park

Wild plants are important in providing habitat and food for wildlife, protecting the soil from erosion, and are of great value to human life. They also provide aesthetic value. Wild plants are an important component of the natural environment. They produce oxygen and they help to clean the air.

African tamarisk: A deciduous shrub or medium-sized tree, reaching up to 5 metres (16 ft) in height. Its flowers are grouped and are white, seen in late winter to early spring. Indigenous wild trees are rare. In the park these can be found near the sea.

Barbary nut iris: A small herbaceous perennial that is very common in the park. It has attractive bluish flowers that open in the early afternoon and close in the evening. Frequently met with along paths in the park.

Blue stonecrop: A small often reddish succulent annual with small flowers. These plants often grow in patches and in shallow rock pools and depressions in the garrigue. Common and flowers in spring.

Borage: An annual plant with blue flowers in winter and spring and bristly leaves. Common and often found in disturbed ground.

Branched asphodel: An attractive rather robust plant with white flowers that can be seen in winter and spring.

Clustered sulla: Flowers in spring colouring the rocky ground with its purplish flowers. It is an annual plant and often grows with stems spreading over the ground. The seeds are found in segmented spiny pods, each segment with one seed each.

Common pyramidal orchid: The park's symbol. One of the commonest orchids mainly in garrigue and rocky steppe. Its flowers are grouped in cone-shaped to cylindrical inflorescence, pale or dark pink/purple. Flowers in spring.

Conical orchid: The colour of the flowers varies from plant to plant. Almost white to dark red with several spots. One of many orchids that can be seen in the park and can be found flowering in late winter.

Dodder: This parasitic plant appears as a mass of red filaments. It has small inconspicuous flowers. Common and can be seen growing on several plants such as on the sea squill.

Esparto grass: This grass frequently grows on clay forming steppe habitats. The plant spreads by sea and by rhizomes that help to protect the clay from erosion. Flowers mainly in late spring.

Evergreen honeysuckle: A shrub that can be found in the garrigue and in maquis shrubland.

Giant fennel: A robust plant with huge yet low aromatic flowers grouped in largo umbels attracting several insects such as wasps. The flowers appear in late winter and spring.

Over 350 species of wild plants, some of which are endemic, sub-endemic or rare are found at Il-Majjistral Nature and History Park. The stretches of rocky ground abound with orchids including the endemic Maltese pyramidal orchid, together with several species of shrubs such as Mediterranean thyme. This shrub gives these rocky grounds of the park a vivid violet at the height of its flowering season in June. At the bottom of the cliffs there is an array of wild plant species including ferns, climber plants such as the black bryony and esparto grass covering the clay slopes. Areas of farmed or fallow land hold field gladiolus and other plants associated with these habitats. Over 1300 plants were planted including olives, sandarac gum tree, evergreen oak, carob, lentisk, wolfbane, myrtle, rockrose, and golden samphire.

=== Fauna ===
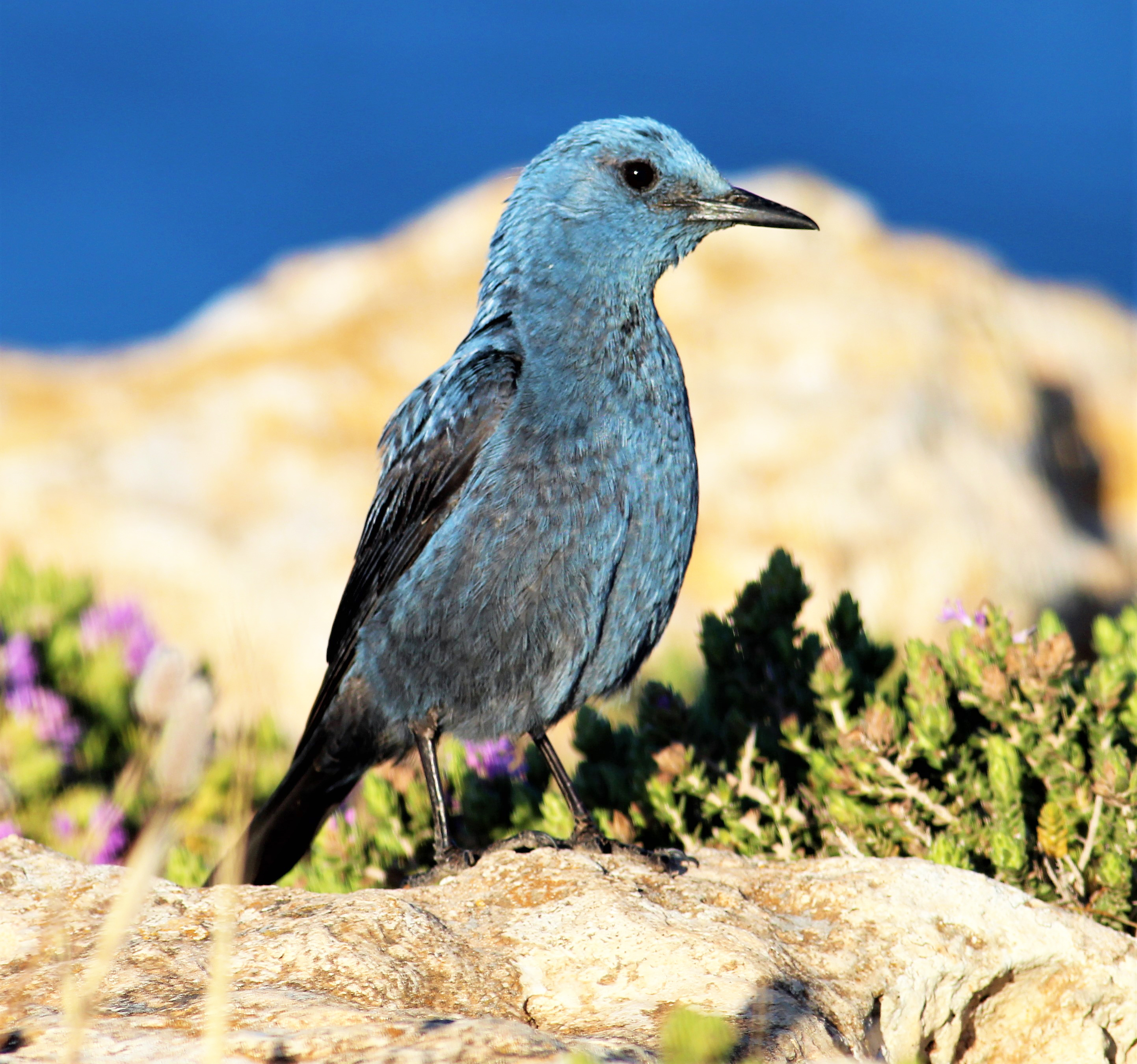
Blue Rock Thrush, Malta’s national bird

The park's area includes diverse and unique habitats that are important for many species of fauna including rare and endemic species. These reptiles have been regularly recorded in Il-Majjistral Nature and History Park, suggesting that they are not uncommon. Other reptiles inhabiting the park include the Moorish gecko, often seen basking in the sun on walls, ocellated skink, and Western whip snake, the most likely of the snakes to be encountered by day. Judging by the burrows and their droppings, wild rabbits are numerous. They are shy and rarely show up during the day. If lucky, one can also see a top predator – the weasel, hurriedly crossing a path and disappearing in a wall or among boulders, shrubs or trees. The painted frog is the only indigenous amphibian in the Maltese Island; it is found in freshwater habitats. During the summer drought it usually hides away in damp places. The painted frog lays hundreds of eggs which hatch into tadpoles that can only live in fresh water.

=== Breeding Birds ===
Several species of birds can be seen in the park and at least ten species nest there. Six of these are resident and can be found all year round. They are the blue rock thrush, the Spanish sparrow, the zitting cisticola, the Sardinian warbler, the spectacled warbler and the corn bunting. The other breeding birds — the tawny pipit, the short-toed lark, the swallow and the yelkouan shearwater — come to the park to breed and then leave after the nesting season.

== Heritage in the Park ==
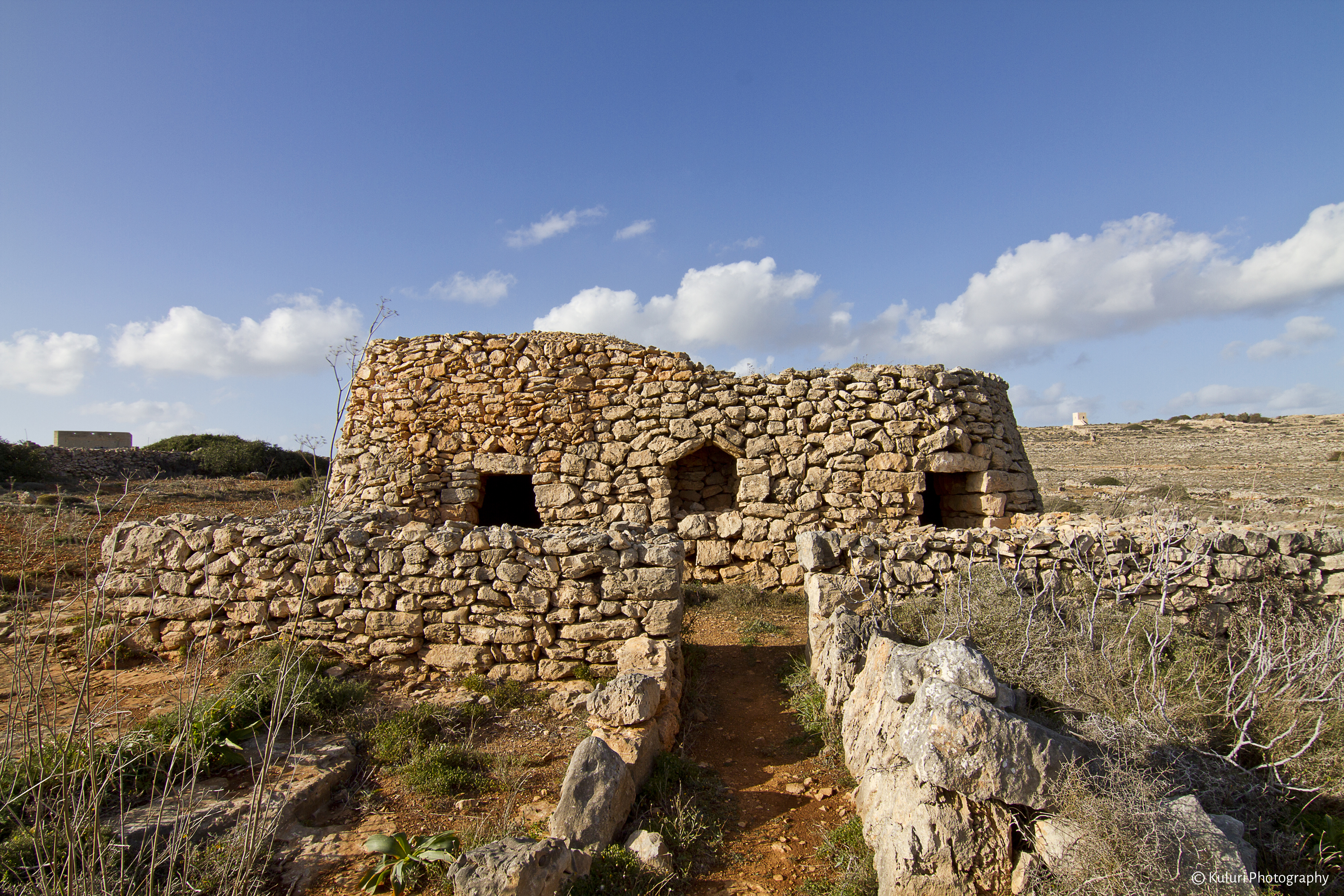
A corbeled stone hut

In the Majjistral Park, as in many other protected areas, the natural landscape has been modified during the centuries by human hands. Ancient populations who lived here left a lot of traces that can testify to their activities. Today they represent a considerable historical heritage that enriches the park with history and culture. Walking along the planned routes is the best way to view the archaeological remains in the park. There are many examples of human intervention in this largely natural area. These include small agricultural holdings and corbelled stone huts, various cart ruts and rock cut tombs dating back to the Punic period.

One of the most important features of the park is It-Torri ta’ Għajn Żnuber, also known as Għajn Żnuber Tower. It was not one of the watchtowers erected by the Knights and it is believed to have been built in the late 19th century. It was used as a signal station and lookout post during the Second World War. This tower has now been restored by Il-Majjistral Park.

== Activities ==
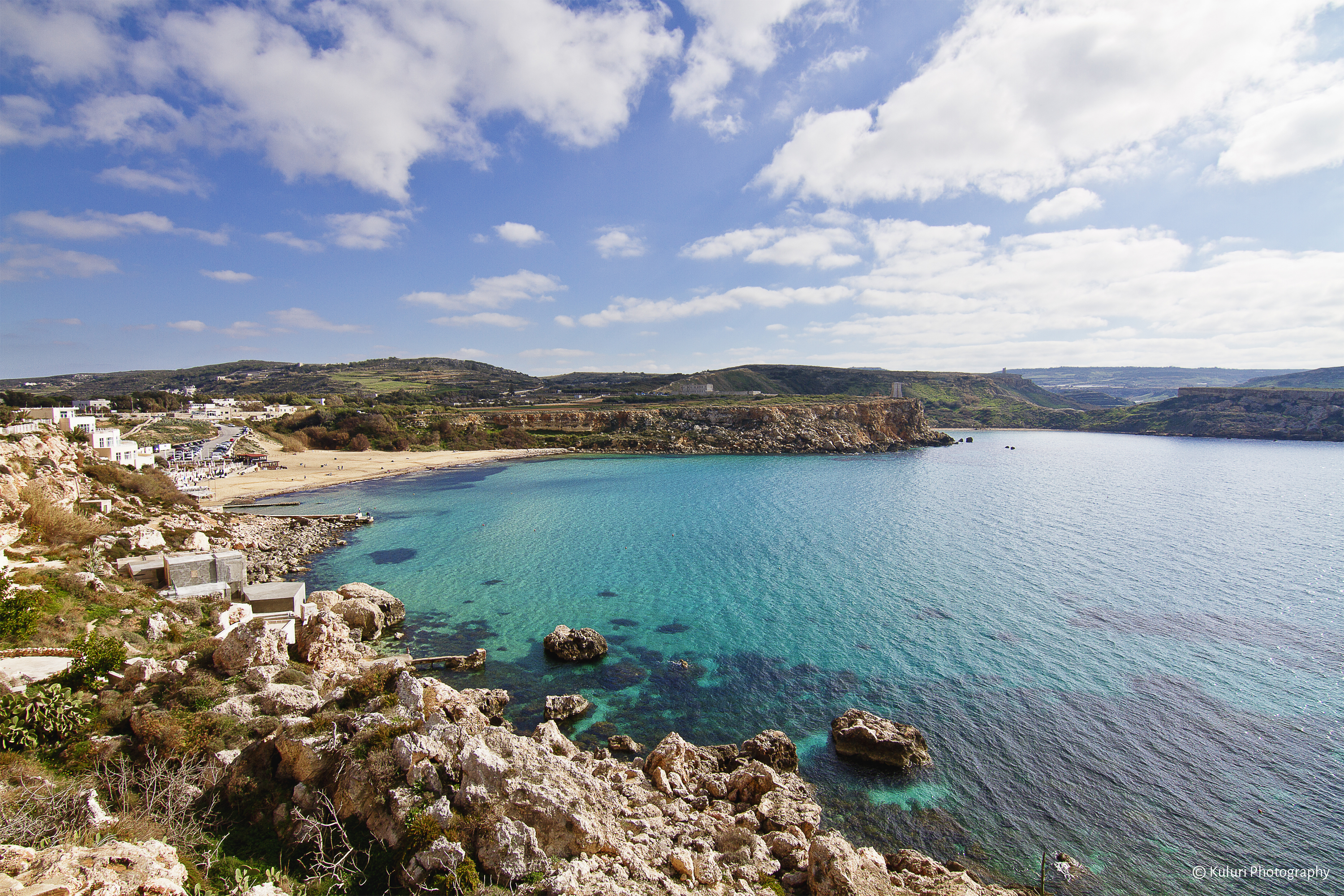
Golden Bay (Maltese: Il-Mixquqa)

The park offers a variety of activities at a stretch of 6 kilometres (3.7 mi) of protected heritage coast. These include educational nature guided walks, cleanups, tree planting, seasonal olive picking, rubble wall construction, control of invasive plant species, guided snorkeling tours, and bird watching.
