= 1962 in philosophy =

1962 in philosophy was a critical year for the publication of a number of important works.

Also, a large number of notable philosophers who came of age in the early 21st century were born in 1962.

== Events ==
- Progressive utilization theory (PROUT) is fully outlined for the first time by Indian philosopher and spiritual leader Prabhat Ranjan Sarkar.
- Perry Anderson takes over editorship of the New Left Review in the U.K., changing its emphasis to the theoretical.

== Publications ==
- Geach, Peter. Reference and Generality. Cornell University Press.
- Kuhn, T. S. The Structure of Scientific Revolutions (1962)
- Leavis, F. R. Two Cultures? The Significance of C.P. Snow, (the Richmond Lecture, with an Essay on Sir Charles Snow's Rede Lecture by Michael Yudkin), London: Chatto & Windus.
- Jürgen Habermas, The Structural Transformation of the Public Sphere (1962)
- Alfred Schmidt, The Concept of Nature in Marx (1962)
- Rachel Carson, Silent Spring (1962)
- J. L. Austin, Sense and Sensibilia (published posthumously in 1962)
- Marshall McLuhan, The Gutenberg Galaxy (1962)
- Milton Friedman, Capitalism and Freedom (1962)
- Turbayne, Colin Murray, The Myth of Metaphor (1962)

== Births ==
- January 17 - Nick Land
- February 26 - Andreas Kinneging
- April 5 - Roel Kuiper
- April 24 - Keith DeRose, American philosopher and academic
- April 26 - Algis Uždavinys (died 2010)
- May 3 - Anselm Jappe
- June 16 - Jon Oberlander
- August 11 - Erica Benner
- August 13 - Leonidas Donskis (died 2016)
- Lewis Gordon
- Lori Gruen
- Will Kymlicka
- Robin LePoidevin
- Timothy Madigan
- Pete Moore
- Dominique Moulon
- Stephen Mulhall
- Aref Ali Nayed
- Mark Rowlands
- Renata Salecl
- Sonu Shamdasani
- Mikael Stenmark
- Tridandi Swami
- Evan Thompson
- Nigel Warburton
- Tasos Zembylas

== Deaths ==
- January 20 - Robinson Jeffers, 75
- January 31 - Stefan Błachowski, 72
- February 14 - Kurt Singer, 75
- February 24 - Hu Shih, 70, Chinese philosopher, essayist and diplomat
- April 19 - Jacques Chevalier, 80
- April 29 - Hajime Tanabe
- May 11 - Arthur Edward Murphy, 60
- June 24 - William Mitchell (philosopher), 101
- July 6 - John Anderson, 68, Scottish-born Australian philosopher and academic
- July 9 - Georges Bataille, 64
- July 25 - Anastasio Cuschieri, 90
- October 9 - Milan Vidmar, 77
- October 16 - Gaston Bachelard, 78
- November 2 - George Barton Cutten, 88
- November 18 - Niels Bohr, 77
- December 1 - Henri Wallon (psychologist), 83
- December 27 - Serge Raynaud de la Ferriere, 46, French religious philosopher
- Gerardus Johannes Geers
- Francesc Pujols
- Francisco Romero (philosopher)
