= Peter Moore =

Peter or Pete Moore may refer to:

== Politicians ==
- Peter Moore (British politician) (1753–1828), English civil servant of the East India Company and politician
- Peter Moore (Queensland politician) (born 1938), member of the Queensland Legislative Assembly

== Sports ==
- Peter "Bullfrog" Moore (1932–2000), Australian rugby league administrator
- Peter Moore (Australian rules footballer) (born 1957), winner of the Brownlow Medal in 1979 and 1984
- Peter Moore (Gaelic footballer) (1940–2010), Irish Gaelic footballer
- Peter Moore (shoe designer) (1944–2022), American shoe and logos designer for Nike Inc. and Adidas
- Peter Moore (speedway rider) (1929–1996), Australian motorcycle speedway rider
- Peter Moore (rugby union) (born 1948), Australian rugby union player
- Peter Moore (cyclist), American track cyclist
- Peter Moore (badminton) (born 1945), Northern Irish badminton player

== Music ==
- Pete Moore (composer) (1924–2013), British composer and popular music arranger
- Pete Moore (The Miracles), bass singer for the Motown group the Miracles
- Peter J. Moore (1956–2023), Canadian music producer
- Peter Moore (trombonist) (born 1996), winner of BBC Young Musician of the Year in 2008

== Writers ==
- Pete Moore (science writer) (born 1962), British science writer
- Peter Moore (travel author) (born 1962), Australian travel writer
- Peter Moore (historian) (born 1983), British historian, lecturer and podcaster

== Others ==
- Peter G. Moore (1928–2010), British statistician
- Peter Moore (businessman) (born 1955), former president of Sega of America, executive at Reebok, Microsoft and Electronic Arts, and CEO of Liverpool FC
- Peter Moore (chemist) (born 1939), professor at Yale University
- Peter Moore (priest) (1924–2000), Dean of St Albans, 1973–1993
- Peter Moore (serial killer) (born 1946), British serial killer
- Peter Moore (The Messengers), fictional character in TV series, The Messengers
- Peter Moore (town crier) (1939–2009), town crier of London
- Peter Moore, computer consultant from Britain kidnapped in Iraq; see Foreign hostages in Iraq#United Kingdom
- Peter Moore, executive producer of various television documentaries, including 638 Ways to Kill Castro
- Peter Weddick Moore (1859–1934), North Carolina educator and president of Elizabeth City State University
- Peter Moore (photographer) (1932-1993), British-American photographer

== See also ==
- Peter Moor (born 1991), Zimbabwean cricketer
- Peter Moores (disambiguation)
