= Mario Vella =

Maltese philosopher, economist and politician

Governor of the Central Bank of Malta
- In office 1 July 2016 – 31 December 2020
- Prime Minister: Joseph Muscat, Robert Abela
- Preceded by: Josef Bonnici
- Succeeded by: Edward Scicluna

Personal details
- Born: Tripoli, Kingdom of Libya
- Party: Labour Party
- Education: University of Malta, LSE, Humboldt University

Mario Vella (born 1953 in Tripoli) is a Maltese philosopher, economist and politician. He was Governor of the Central Bank of Malta from 2016 to 2020.

== Biography ==
=== Studies and academic career ===
Vella was born to a Maltese family in Tripoli, Libya, and lived his boyhood within the Italian community there. He started his education at a Catholic school in Tripoli, then returned to Malta with his family and attended De La Salle College at Cottonera.

Vella studied philosophy at the Royal University of Malta, social economy with a major in sociology at the London School of Economics and Political Science, and international political economy at Humboldt University of Berlin in East Germany. His professional and academic interests have focused on economic development and foreign direct investments.

In Malta, after teaching Italian and sociology in public schools, Vella taught political economy and social development for about twenty years at the University of Malta.

In 2005 Vella was visiting professor in foreign direct investment and development at the Università Cattolica di Milano and at the University of Urbino. Between 2007 and 2012 he was visiting professor at Edinburgh Napier University.

=== Professional and political career ===
Since the times of Labour premier Karmenu Mifsud Bonnici, in 1979-1980 and then from 1984 to 2000, Mario Vella served at the Malta Development Corporation (MDC), up to chief executive officer. During the 1987-1996 governments of the Nationalist Party, Vella was relieved of his leadership duties at the MDC since, according to Daphne Caruana Galizia, he was considered unfit and not to be trusted, as responsible for the development of a protected economic system based on import substitution via high tariffs or import bans. Vella stayed in his post, albeit with no duties, for 9 years. He returned to the helm of the MDC (first as Policy and Planning Coordinator, and soon after as CEO) in 1996-1998 at the time of Alfred Sant's Labour government, during which years he supported the rise of Joseph Muscat in the party.

According to Daphne Caruana Galizia, Vella has been Joseph Muscat's mentor since his young age, and inspired Muscat's PhD thesis, written during Muscat's MEP term. Vella's work is referenced in the thesis, and it is alleged by Caruana Galizia that he might have himself authored certain parts of it.

From 1994 till 2000, Mario Vella also served in a political position as President of the Malta Labour Party. As reported by Joseph Muscat, Vella influenced the party manifesto for the 1996 Maltese general election, in particular as regards economics, in which the party to give the same attention to domestic-oriented small enterprises than to larger export-oriented companies. Also for this, Mario Vella was chosen by Prime Minister Alfred Sant to reform the Malta Development Corporation. The result was the establishment of the Institute for the Promotion of Small Enterprise (IPSE), in which Joseph Muscat was also employed.

In 1998, with the return of the Nationalists to government, Mario Vella left the MDC and switched to the private sector, working as director of foreign direct investment services for the consulting firm Grant Thornton in Malta.

In 2013 Vella was appointed by the new Labour government as chairman of the MDC's successor organisation, the national economic development and investment promotion agency, Malta Enterprise, where he served for 3 years. He was replaced in the post by Mario Galea.

In December 2014, Mario Vella was conferred the title of Cavaliere dell'Ordine al Merito della Repubblica Italiana.

=== Governor of the Central Bank of Malta ===
In June 2016, after former deputy governor Alfred Mifsud withdrew his candidacy, Mario Vella was appointed by the Maltese Prime Minister Joseph Muscat for a 5-year term as Governor of the Central Bank of Malta. His nomination raised criticism by the opposition as well as by three Labour ministers (including his future successor Edward Scicluna), who would have preferred the more bipartisan choice of Rene Saliba. In 2017, Central Bank employees complained with the media that the new Governor’s Award Scheme was at risk of political bias, as its selection panel included two former General Workers' Union officials. Growing politicisation of the Central Bank employees, with promotions handed out to Labour-leaning officials, had been reported since 2013.

As Governor, Vella was a member of the Governing Council of the European Central Bank, an Alternate Governor for Malta in the International Monetary Fund, and a member of the Board of Governors of the Malta Financial Services Authority. He was also ex officio member of the Malta Council for Economic and Social Development, and a trustee of the University of Malta Research, Innovation and Development Trust.

Vella is also a regular contributor to the Times of Malta and maintained a personal blog from 2008 to 2012.

== Philosophical works ==
Vella's area of specialisation in philosophy is chiefly critical analysis.

In part, Vella’s philosophy is deconstructivist, tenaciously exposing the internal conflicts that tend to undercut the asserted meaning of any text. But this is not all. It is also contextualist. To Vella’s mind, in order to be acceptable, philosophy must begin from, and build on, the socio-political and historical context. Neither philosophy nor the history of philosophy can rise above power and history. Doing philosophy means taking political positions for or against historically concrete structures of power, and the forces struggling for power within society.

=== Reflections in a Canvas Bag (1989) ===
Reflections in a Canvas Bag (1989) is Vella's major philosophical book. The book is a critique of the philosophy of Peter Serracino Inglott in general, and of his book Beginning Philosophy (1987) in particular. However, it is also a sort of invitation (or instigation) to do philosophy by starting from history (as Vella does) rather than from theory (as Serracino Inglott does). History here is understood in the sense of Marx’s historical materialism. When published, the book was quite exceptional for it uncharacteristically dealt with the analysis and criticism of another Maltese philosopher, and a living one at that - a first since Angelo Pirotta's investigation into the philosophy of Anastasio Cuschieri in the early 20th century.

=== Selected articles ===
- Wara r-Repubblika (Subsequent to the Republic; together with Lillian Sciberras; 1979)
- That Favourite Dream of the Colonies (1994)
- Minflok Dahla (Instead of an Introduction; 1995)

=== Poetry and short stories ===
Sometimes Vella ventures to publish some of his poetry or short stories in Maltese or in English. One example would be those in Wara r-Repubblika (1979). However, this does not seem to be very common. Here is one of his poems:

The Time has come
for the fire eater
to empty himself
on the crowd.

The time has come
for the high wire artist
and the flying acrobat
to fall and fertilize the ground,
the burnt ground, with their blood.

The time has come
to burn the circus top
and crucify the clown
and to release Barabbas,
the lion, from his cage.

=== Editorial work ===
Though Vella sometimes contributes something of his thought to the following editorial works, of course his personality is seen more in the style and content chosen of these publications.

- Pitazzi Homor (Red Copybooks; 1989–90)
- Fl-Antiporta tal-Millennju (On the Threshold of the Millennium; 1995)

== See also ==
- Philosophy in Malta

== Bibliography ==
- Mark Montebello, Il-Ktieb tal-Filosofija f’Malta (A Source Book of Philosophy in Malta), PIN Publications, Malta, 2001.
