= Pudding Shop =

Restaurant in Istanbul, Turkey

Coordinates: 41.00805°N 28.97719°E

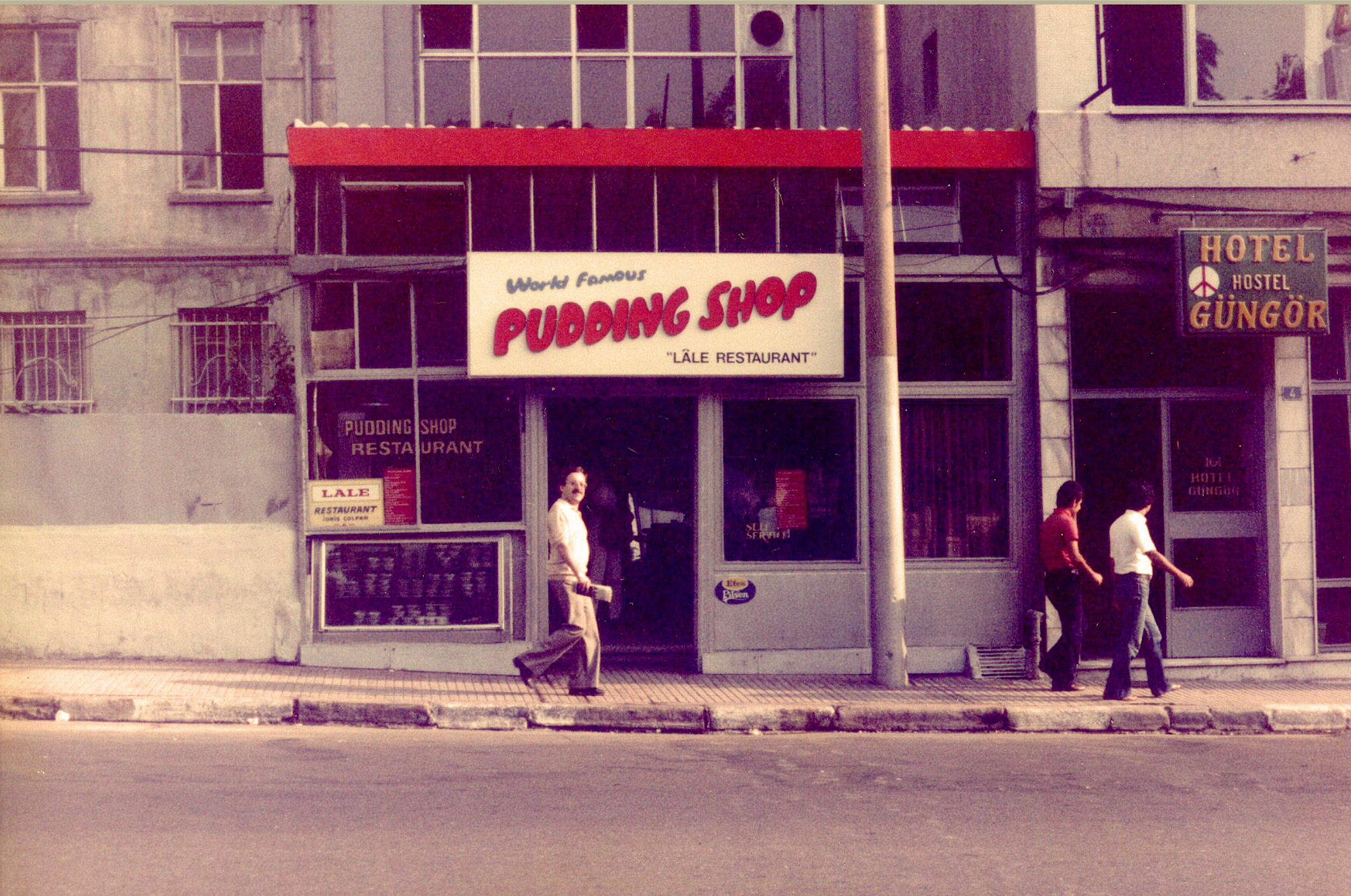
The Pudding Shop in 1982

The Pudding Shop is the nickname for the Lale Restaurant in Sultanahmet, Istanbul, Turkey. It became popular in the 1960s as a meeting place for beatniks and, later on, hippies and other travellers on overland route between Europe and India, Nepal, and elsewhere in Asia: the "hippie trail". The restaurant got its colloquial name as a result of "word of mouth" from numerous foreign travellers that could not remember the name of the restaurant but did remember the wide and popular selection of puddings sold there and thus referred to it as the "pudding shop".

== Background ==
Brothers İdris and Namık Çolpan opened the restaurant in 1957.

Later, most of its customers were tourists, the Pudding Shop eventually developed into a popular rest stop, a place where people could gather, discuss their travelling experiences, and delight in fairly priced, traditional Turkish food. Among the restaurant's variety of well-known dishes and desserts was tavuk göğsü, a seldom found pudding made from pounded chicken breast, rice flour, milk, sugar topped with cinnamon. The restaurant still offers this dish, catering to customers with appetites for traditional Turkish cuisine.

During the 1960s, customers could enjoy their meals inside, where there were large booths and couches surrounded by piles of books and the audible music of contemporary rock bands playing lightly in the background. Decoration was minimal; on the plain white walls hung occasional prints of paintings and photographs without a real theme. Towards the left side of the restaurant's interior, the entire wall was composed of glass, creating a greater sense of space for the small location. The lack of decor did not in any way make the restaurant appear meek or glum. The garden was another area to relax and eat with the grand view of the Blue Mosque and the Hagia Sophia in the distance. Here many customers played their instruments, sang, and conversed about their travels in the fresh air. Adem Çolpan, son of İdris Çolpan, remembers how "it was the time of the Vietnam War" and how many of the travellers just "lived for the moment… didn't think much of tomorrow."

In its first few years, the Pudding Shop was the only place in the area where direct transportation to Asia and tourist information on Turkey were readily available. With this knowledge, the Çolpan brothers put up a bulletin board inside the restaurant so that travellers could schedule rides with their fellow travellers and communicate with friends and family members. This board was very useful to the tourists, and eventually became notorious for the variety of personal messages that were posted alongside the transportation notifications. These included love and apology letters; one of the board's most well-known posts was an open love letter from "Megan" to "Malcolm" in which she asked for his forgiveness and apologised for "the business down in Greece."

A few other messages from the 1960s travellers are still posted on the board today serving as nostalgic homages to its past.

== Today ==
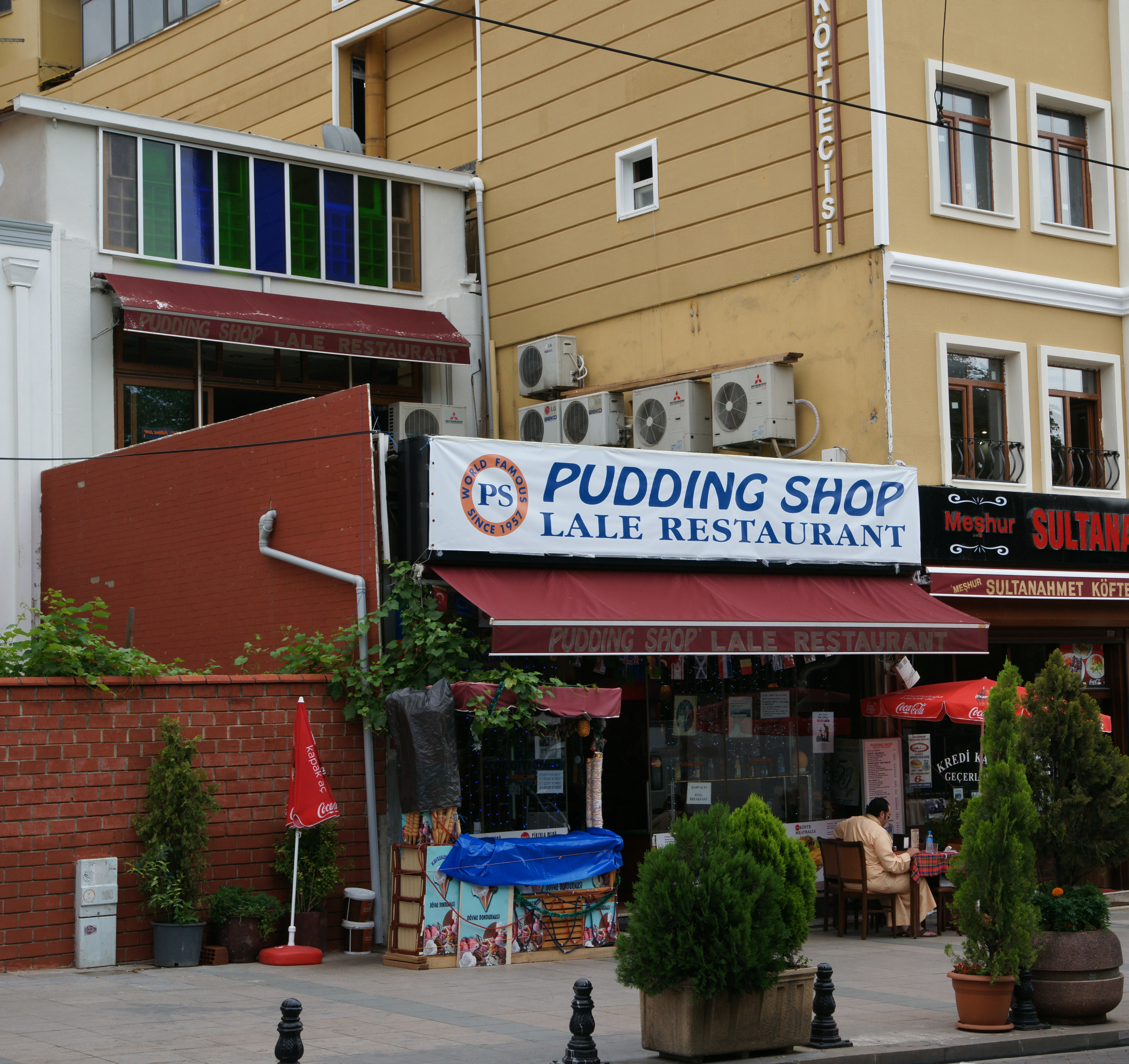
The Pudding Shop in 2010

Outside the restaurant, there is now a large sign that says "The World Famous Pudding Shop" and inside there are no longer servers but a self-service cafeteria and a large menu illuminated by neon lights. The old bulletin board still hangs but is no longer flooded by messages between family members, friends, and lovers. Today, it is covered instead, with less romantic and more practical messages between travellers. The garden where travellers once congregated for meals, or after meals to play their instruments has been removed. Some individuals believe that the major change that the restaurant has undergone since its hippie hey-days is due to the fame that it has acquired. In 1978, the Pudding Shop was featured in the popular book and film Midnight Express, which contributed to the growing reputation of the restaurant.

== See also ==
- Chicken Street
- Freak Street
