= Cuschieri =

Cuschieri is a surname. Notable people with the surname include:

- Alfred Cuschieri (born 1938), Maltese academic and surgeon
- Anastasio Cuschieri (1872–1962), Maltese poet, politician, and philosopher
- Joseph Cuschieri (born 1968), Maltese politician
- Rachel Cuschieri (born 1992), Maltese women's footballer
