= India–United Kingdom bus routes =

Coach service

The United Kingdom (green) and India (orange)

Numerous United Kingdom–India bus routes ran from the 1950s to the 1970s. The first of these was "The Indiaman", a service from London to Calcutta that was inaugurated on 15 April 1957. At least 32 other operators ran services, including Albert Travel, which ran 15 round journeys from London to India. The routes covered thousands of miles and could take around 50 days each way. Overland journeys became increasingly difficult because of political unrest in the Middle East during the 1970s and ended with the 1979 Iranian Revolution and Soviet–Afghan War. The Albert bus was refurbished from 2009 and made a one-off return trip from the UK to Australia in 2012. No new bus journeys between the two countries are currently planned.

== The Indiaman ==
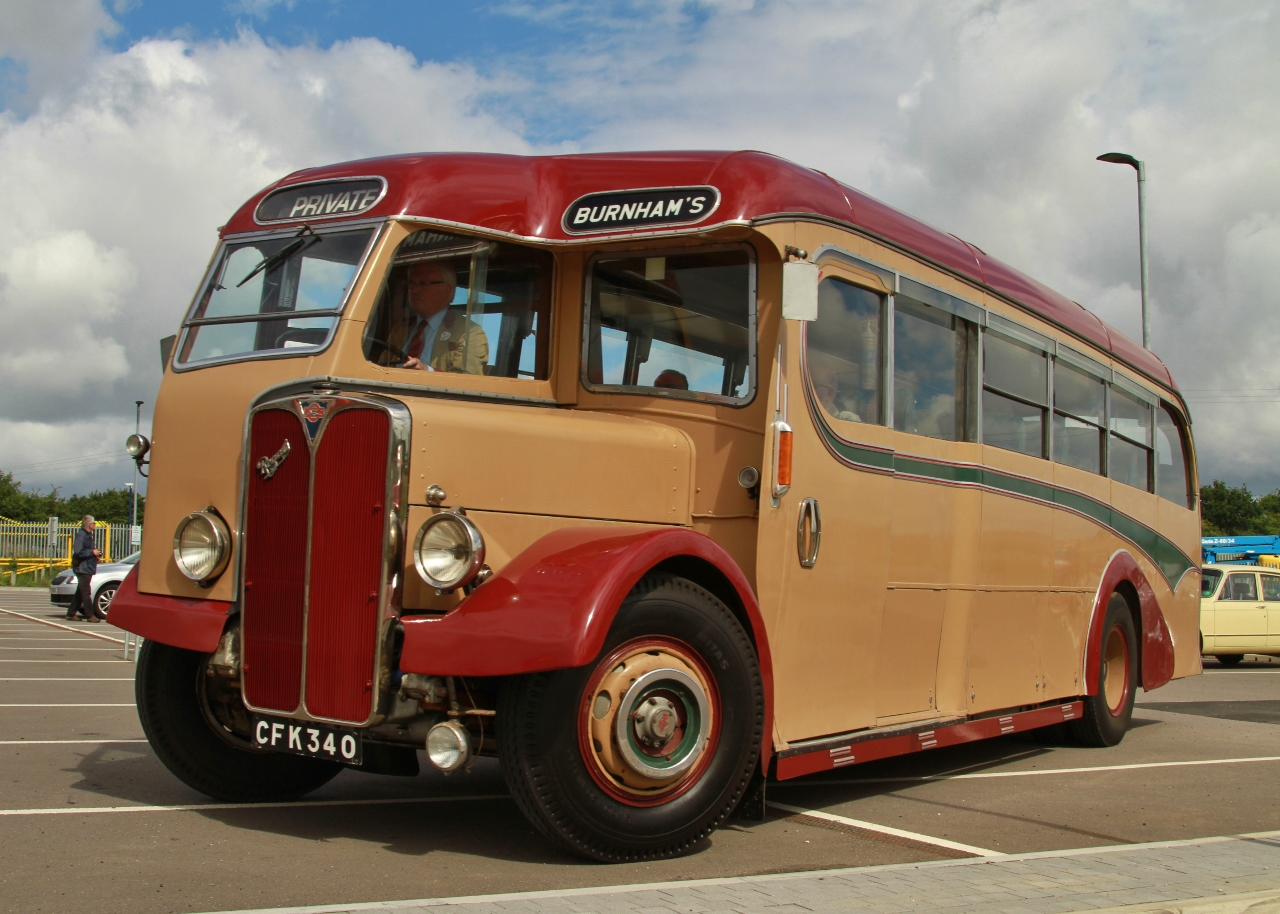
A 1948 AEC Regal III

The first UK–India bus service was "The Indiaman", run by London-based Garrow-Fisher Tours. This left Victoria Coach Station on 15 April 1957 and returned after a 20,000-mile (32,000 km) journey to Calcutta on 2 August. The journey, which was covered by The New York Times, was eventful, with driver Oswald-Joseph Garrow-Fisher recalling the road passing over high cliffs near Mount Ararat at the Turkey-Soviet Union border, soft verges in India, and needing to use planks under the wheels to escape the desert sand in Iran. On the return leg, the 1957–1958 influenza pandemic forced the closure of the Pakistan-Iran border. The tour diverted from the border to the city of Karachi, intending to find passage on a ship, but upon reaching the port they learned the land border had reopened and so returned that way, a diversion of some 1,200 miles (1,900 km). The British embassy in Tehran had heard a rumour that the passengers had been murdered en route and were so relieved when they arrived unharmed that they hosted a cocktail party in their honour.

The Indiaman was a 1948 AEC Regal III. Garrow-Fisher refurbished the 33-seater bus, which had already travelled 100,000 miles (160,000 km), for the journey. In its transcontinental configuration, it could carry 24 passengers plus luggage. For the first journey, Garrow-Fisher charged £85 for the outbound fare and £65 for the return; 20 passengers were carried to India and 7 made the return journey. Passengers slept overnight in hotels or camped outside. One passenger, Peter Moss, wrote a book about the journey: The Indiaman – When the Going was Good by Land and Sea. The Indiaman made four return journeys in total.

== Albert ==
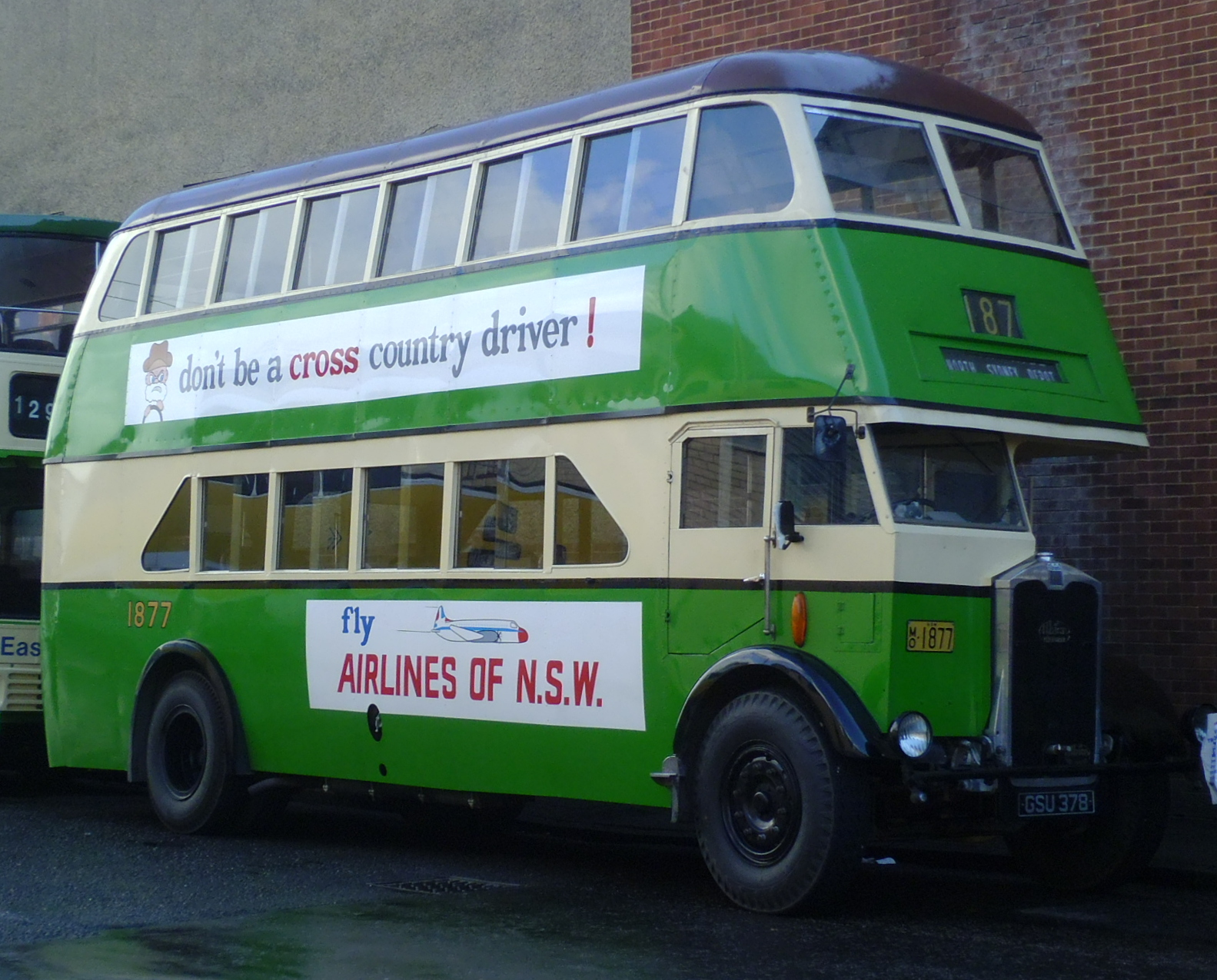
An Albion Venturer

A bus named "Albert" was run by Albert Travel from May 1968. The venture was started by British travel agent and Australian resident Andy Stewart, who purchased a 1947 Albion Motors CS Venturer double-decker bus from the New South Wales Department of Government Transport; the bus had previously operated the number 2004 service in Sydney. Stewart managed to reduce the asking price from AU$1000 to AU$400 as the bus was not capable of going above 32 miles per hour (51 km/h) and had a large dent in the rear. He fitted it out with bunk beds to suit 14 passengers, extra fuel tanks, and a drinking water supply. There was also heating in the lower deck, a radio and cassette player, a reading and dining saloon, and a kitchen with a gas cooker and sink. Other descriptions of the service also mention separate sleeping bunks for passengers, fan-operated heaters, a forward observation lounge on the upper deck, and a music system used for parties.

Starting in Australia, with the bus transferred by ship to India, Stewart drove 13 passengers on the first trip to London. He made a further 14 round trips between 1968 and 1975, when political instability in Iran forced him to stop. A typical route ran from Victoria Coach Station via Belgium, West Germany, Austria, Yugoslavia, Bulgaria, Turkey, Iran, Afghanistan, West Pakistan to India, where it stopped at New Delhi, Agra, Allahabad, Banaras, and Calcutta. The route covered approximately 10,000 miles (16,000 km) each way, and the journey took around 50 days. The bus stopped en route to allow passengers to visit sites of interest and local shops. Stops included tourist destinations such as Banaras and the Taj Mahal, as well as shopping opportunities in Salzburg, Vienna, Istanbul, Tehran, and Kabul. Until 1970, the bus was shipped from Calcutta to Sydney. Thereafter, the bus ran to Calcutta, from which passengers could choose to fly across Burma to Bangkok, Thailand, and continue by train through Malaysia to Singapore, where a boat would carry them to Perth or Sydney, Australia.

In the early years, a one-way ticket was £85; this rose to £125 by the early 1970s, excluding catering. The connection via Singapore to Australia was a further £125. Other accounts give a one-way fare of £145 by 1973. The trip was advertised as "the world's longest bus route" and "your complete home while you travel".

Stewart returned to Australia as a travel agent after making the last trip to London. He retired back to the UK and, in 2001, tracked down the Albert bus, which was in Brighton. He purchased the vehicle in 2009 and renovated it to make a return journey overland to Australia. He raised funds by selling shares at £250 each, with the owners of ten or more shares being entitled to a seat on the trip. The journey was completed in 2012 and the bus remains in Australia, making appearances at car shows.

== Other operators ==
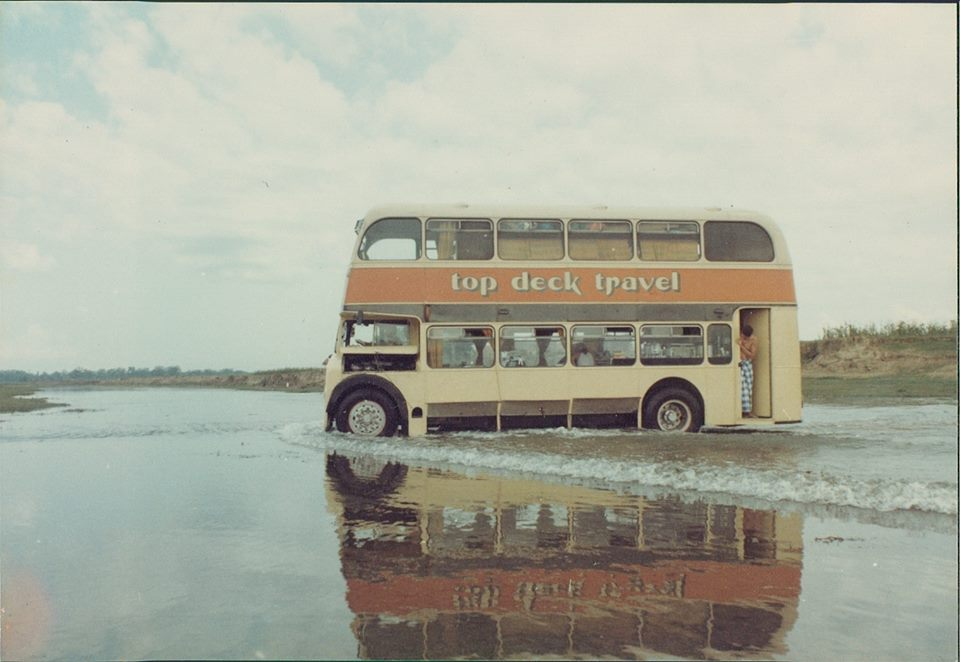
A Topdeck Travel bus in India, 1983

In the decade following the inauguration of "The Indiaman", at least 32 operators arranged bus trips between the UK and India. These included the Waltzing Matilda, Topdeck Travel, Swagman Tour's Asian Greyhound, Tentrek Expeditions, King Kong, Crazy Bus, Penn Overland, and No Sweat Overland Tours. Vehicles varied from double-decker buses to converted fire engines and typically took 20 days each way. Penn Travel had a "Marco Polo Tour" route that ran from London to Kathmandu over 72 days. Some of the companies would also arrange hotels en route and broker visas for their passengers. Eastbound travellers were usually westerners seeking adventure, while westbound travellers were often economic migrants from Punjab. Operators claimed cultural differences and difficulties at the border crossings made westbound trips more troublesome and charged an additional £20 for these. At least one driver insisted on being armed for all westbound journeys. The closure of the Afghanistan-Pakistan border in 1978 meant some journeys had to be completed by air, and the overland routes became completely untenable following the 1979 Iranian Revolution and Soviet–Afghan War.

== Attempts at revival ==
In 2020, it was announced that the Indian travel operator Adventures Overland, inspired by the Hippie Trail, would inaugurate a new bus service from Delhi to London in May 2021. This would run through 18 countries, leaving India through Myanmar, then to Thailand, Laos, China, Russia, through Europe, and finally to Belgium. A one-way trip would cost 1.5 million rupees (circa £15,320) and take 70 days to cover the 12,500 miles (20,100 km) route. The bus would carry 20 passengers. In March 2021, the company postponed the launch of the service to April 2022. This has since been again postponed; the company stated they had completed three return trial journeys to prove the route's viability. In 2023 Adventures Overland, unable to identify a suitable route with Burmese, Chinese, and Russian borders closed, launched a shortened route from Istanbul to London. This route covers 12,000 kilometres (7,500 mi) in 56 days and visits 22 countries. By this point the company had successfully carried 100 passengers from India to the UK in three car convoys, with the journey taking 50 days.

== See also ==
- India-United Kingdom maritime routes:
  - Indo-Mediterranean
