= Anton Roux =

South African cricketer

- Roux with the Asia Cup trophy, 2022

Personal information
- Full name: Anton Roux
- Born: 5 June 1981 (age 45); New York City, United States
- Nickname: "Rooster"
- Batting: Right-handed
- Bowling: Right-arm off-break
- Role: All-rounder

Domestic team information
- Years: Team
- 2008–2009: Northerns

Head coaching information
- Years: Team
- 2008–2011: Tuks Cricket Academy
- 2011–2012: KwaZulu-Natal Inland
- 2013–2016: Netherlands
- 2026: Netherlands (interim)

Career statistics
Competition	FC	LA
Matches	4	4
Runs scored	63	76
Batting average	21.00	38.00
100s/50s	0/0	0/0
Top score	22*	33*
Balls bowled	317	132
Wickets	5	4
Bowling average	45.40	25.75
5 wickets in innings	0	0
10 wickets in match	0	n/a
Best bowling	3/30	2/36
Catches/stumpings	4/–	5/–
- Source: CricketArchive, 20 May 2014

Anton Roux (born 5 June 1981) is a South African cricket coach and former cricketer. A specialist bowling and fielding coach, his recent appointments include national lead fielding coach of Sri Lanka, with whom he won the 2022 Asia Cup, bowling coach of the South African white-ball team, fielding coach of Delhi Capitals in the 2025 Indian Premier League and bowling coach of Trent Rockets in The Hundred. He was head coach of the Netherlands from 2013 to 2016, leading them to victory over England at the 2014 World Twenty20, and returned as interim head coach in 2026. He has also coached at Otago and with New Zealand A, and currently works in cricket technology with Trackman.

== Playing career ==
At South African domestic level, Roux played for Northerns. A competent off-spinning all-rounder, he made his first-class and List-A debut during the 2007–08 season. He retired at the end of the following season to concentrate on his coaching career.

== Coaching career ==
=== Early coaching career ===
In the 2005 and 2006 Dutch seasons, Roux served as playing coach of the Amstelveen-based Amsterdamsche Cricket Club (ACC), which plays in the top-level Topklasse competition. During his playing career in South Africa, he held a coaching position with the University of Pretoria's High Performance Centre. He later served as head coach of the Tuks Cricket Academy and first team of the University of Pretoria, following his retirement from playing.

=== KwaZulu-Natal Inland ===
In July 2011, Roux was appointed head coach of the Pietermaritzburg-based KwaZulu-Natal Inland team for the 2011–12 season, which played in both the first-class and List-A provincial competitions. Inland's president, Yunus Bhamjee, welcomed the appointment of the 30-year-old, who arrived with a background as head coach of the Northerns Cricket Academy and the Tuks Cricket Academy at the University of Pretoria, and as playing-coach of Amsterdam CC in the Netherlands. Tasked with turning around an underperforming squad, he signed a group of players that included Devon Conway, Glen Addicott, Tabraiz Shamsi, Kyle Nipper and Divan van Wyk.

=== Netherlands ===
After Peter Drinnen vacated the head coach position in October 2013, Roux took over, initially on an interim basis. At the 2014 World Twenty20 the Netherlands defeated England and chased down Ireland's total with the highest successful run pursuit in the tournament's history. In January 2015 the Netherlands won the World Cricket League Division Two tournament in Namibia. The Netherlands were declared joint winners of the 2015 World Twenty20 Qualifier in Ireland after the final against Scotland, in Dublin, was abandoned without a ball bowled. He led the side at the 2016 World Twenty20 in India. Roux stepped down in August 2016 to join Otago; across his tenure the Netherlands won 36 of 52 matches and topped the Intercontinental Cup and World Cricket League Championship tables at his departure.

=== Otago and New Zealand ===
In September 2016, Roux moved to New Zealand as assistant coach of provincial side Otago, working under his fellow South African and long-time collaborator Rob Walter. During his four seasons with the province, several members of the current New Zealand squad came through the Otago setup, among them pace bowler Jacob Duffy, who later credited the remodelling of his bowling action, carried out under Walter and Roux after a 2016–17 bowling revamp, as the turning point in his career. It was also during this period that Roux was called up as assistant coach of New Zealand A.

=== Nottinghamshire ===
Roux was named as pathway coach of English county Nottinghamshire in March 2020, working alongside head coach Peter Moores. The role saw him oversee the development of players in the county's age-group structure while also leading fielding work throughout the club. The club's director of cricket, Mick Newell, described the improvement in Nottinghamshire's fielding that helped them win the 2020 Vitality Blast as the most high-profile example of his work there. He left the county in March 2022 to become Sri Lanka's fielding coach.

=== Sri Lanka ===
In March 2022, Roux was appointed fielding coach of the Sri Lanka national team, formally the national lead fielding coach, a role that covered the men's team, the women's team and development pathways. His two and a half years in the role coincided with the most successful white-ball run the men's side had managed in years: Sri Lanka won the 2022 Asia Cup, finished as runners-up in the 2023 edition, and recorded their first home one-day international series win against Australia in 30 years. He was part of the men's coaching staff at two World Cups, the 2022 T20 World Cup in Australia and the 2023 World Cup in India, and the Sri Lanka women's team won the 2024 Asia Cup during his time with the programme. Roux stepped down from the role in September 2024.

=== South Africa ===
In October 2024, Roux was appointed bowling coach of the South African men's white-ball team. In December 2024, South Africa beat Pakistan at home to win a bilateral T20I series for the first time since August 2022. The side reached the semi-finals of the 2025 Champions Trophy. He left the role in March 2025.

=== Franchises ===
==== Galle Marvels ====
Roux served as bowling and fielding coach of Galle Marvels in the 2024 Lanka Premier League, reaching the tournament final.

==== Delhi Capitals ====
He was fielding coach of Delhi Capitals in the 2025 Indian Premier League. The Capitals finished fifth, missing out on the play-offs by a single point.

==== Trent Rockets ====
In July 2026, Roux was appointed bowling coach of Trent Rockets for the 2026 season of The Hundred, reuniting with Peter Moores, his head coach at Nottinghamshire. The Rockets finished top of the group stage and reached the final.

=== Interim and consultancy coaching ===
Roux served as assistant and fielding coach with the New Zealand national cricket team in 2025.

In April 2026, Roux was announced as interim head coach of the Netherlands men's team, standing in for head coach Ryan Cook when unavailable, after the previous stand-in coach Ryan van Niekerk took up a position with Sri Lanka. His interim stint ended later that year when Ashley Noffke was appointed head coach on a permanent basis.

== Personal life ==
Roux was born in New York City to South African parents. He moved back to South Africa aged five, playing both underage representative cricket and football, and later attended Pretoria Boys High School.

Roux is married to Willemijn de Bruin, who is Dutch; the couple have two sons, and Roux has himself become a Dutch citizen. His second son, Aiden, was born in Colombo in January 2024, during Roux's time with Sri Lanka Cricket, and he was reported to be the first foreign coach of the Sri Lankan national programme to have a child born in the country.
