= Hippie trail =

Overland journey from Europe to Asia

Routes of the hippie trail

The hippie trail (also the overland) was an overland journey taken by members of the hippie subculture and others from 1957 to the late 1970s travelling from Europe and West Asia through South Asia via countries such as Afghanistan, Pakistan, India, Nepal, Sri Lanka, Bangladesh to Thailand. The hippie trail was a form of alternative tourism, and one of the key elements was travelling as cheaply as possible, mainly to extend the length of time away from home. The term "hippie" became current in the mid-to-late 1960s; "beatnik" was the previous term from the later 1950s.

In every major stop of the hippie trail, there were hotels, restaurants and cafés for Westerners, who networked with each other as they travelled east and west. The hippies tended to interact more with the local population than traditional sightseers did.

The hippie trail largely ended in the late 1970s primarily due to both the Iranian Revolution resulting in an anti-Western government, and the Soviet invasion of Afghanistan, closing the route to Western travelers.

== Routes ==
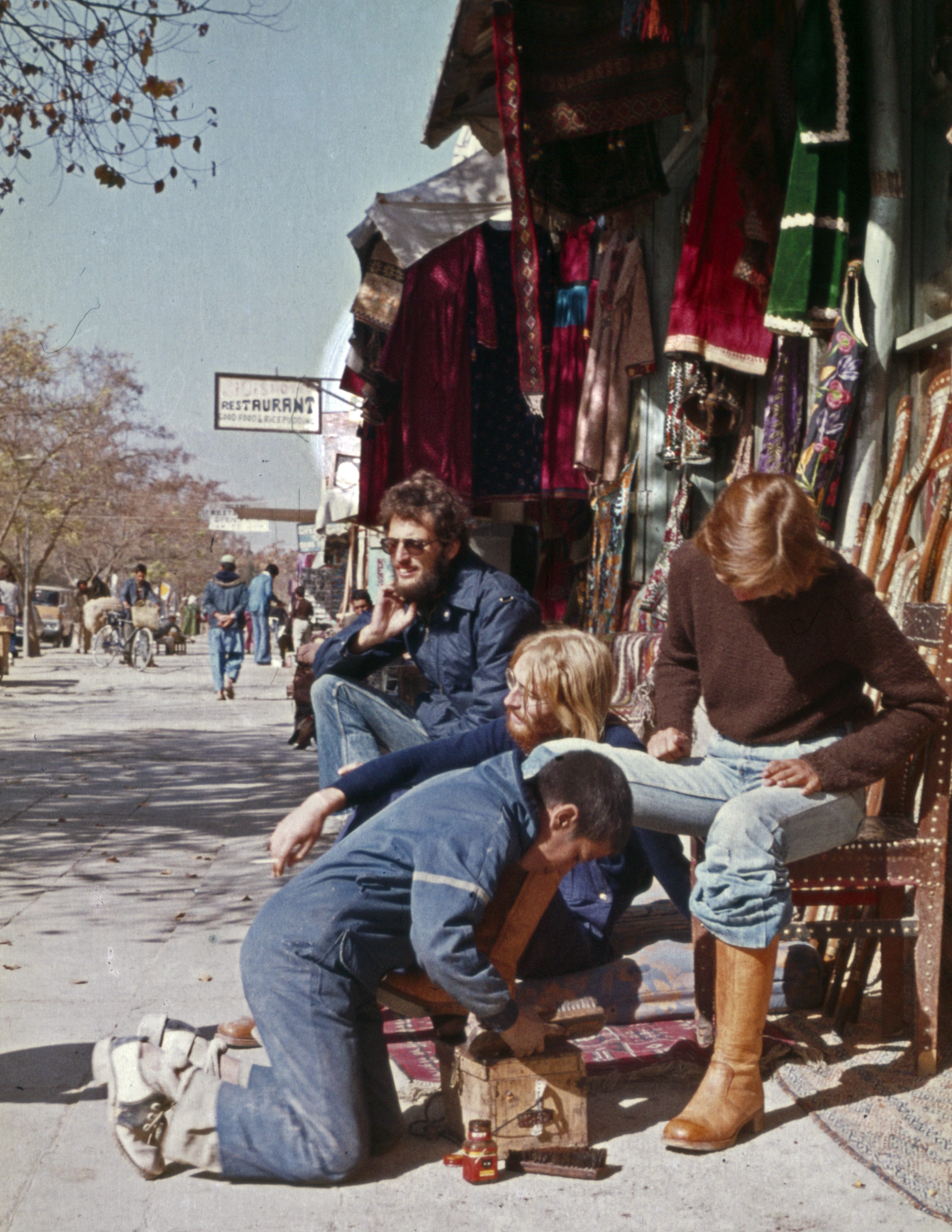
Visiting hippies in Kabul, 1976

Journeys would typically start from cities in western Europe, often London, Copenhagen, West Berlin, Paris, Amsterdam, or Milan. Many from the United States took Icelandic Airlines to Luxembourg. Most journeys passed through Istanbul, where routes divided. The northern route typically went through Tehran, Herat, Kandahar, Kabul, Peshawar, and Lahore before continuing to India, Nepal, and Southeast Asia. An alternative route was from Turkey via Syria, Jordan, Lebanon and Iraq to Iran and Pakistan. All travellers had to cross through Afghanistan and the Khyber Pass, traversing Peshawar and Lahore in Pakistan and over the Pakistan-India border at Ganda Singh Wala (or later at Wagah). However the Hippie Trail never had any one single official route nor any definitive beginning and end point.

Common destinations in the east included Delhi, Varanasi (then known as Benares), Goa, Bombay, Madras, Kathmandu and Bangkok. Kathmandu still has a road, Jhochhen Tole, nicknamed Freak Street in commemoration of the many thousands of hippies who passed through. Further travel to southern India, Kovalam beach in Trivandrum (Kerala) and Sri Lanka (then called Ceylon) was sometimes also undertaken.

Kathmandu was typically the terminus of the hippie trail, as Tibet was off-limits and overland travel through Burma was not possible. India had severely restricted travel to Burma due to clashes between insurgents and Indian armed forces, and the Ledo Road crossing into Burma had fallen into disrepair and been largely reclaimed by the jungle. However, one could fly from Kathmandu to Bangkok to continue the journey in Southeast Asia to Thailand, Malaysia and Indonesia (where Bali was a popular destination for hippies). From Indonesia, there was also the option of crossing to Australia by plane or ship. That led to the trail from Timor to Thailand being classified as Hippie Trail South East Asia Extension, which mainly attracted Australians and New Zealanders traveling the opposite way overland to London.

Tony Wheeler's travel guide, written in Australia for an Australian audience, covers the hippie trail in reverse order, traveling from Australia to Indonesia, Malaysia and Thailand, flying from Bangkok to Kathmandu (or Calcutta) and then continuing on to India and eventually to Europe. Beyond the major route, Jimi Hendrix also popularized Essaouira as a hippie destination in Morocco.

== Methods of travel ==
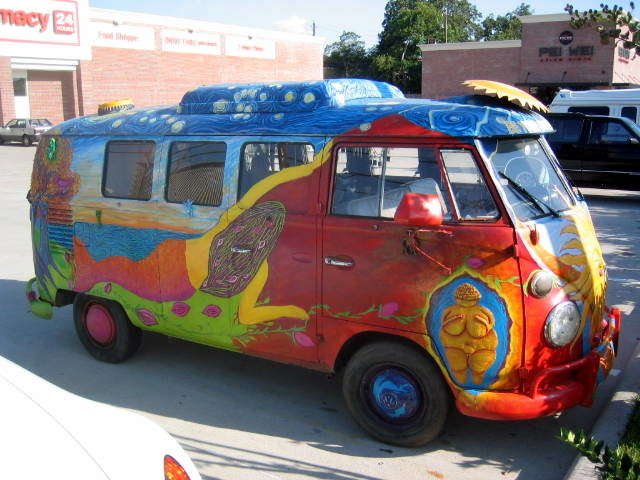
A 1967 VW Kombi bus decorated with hand-painting of the hippie style

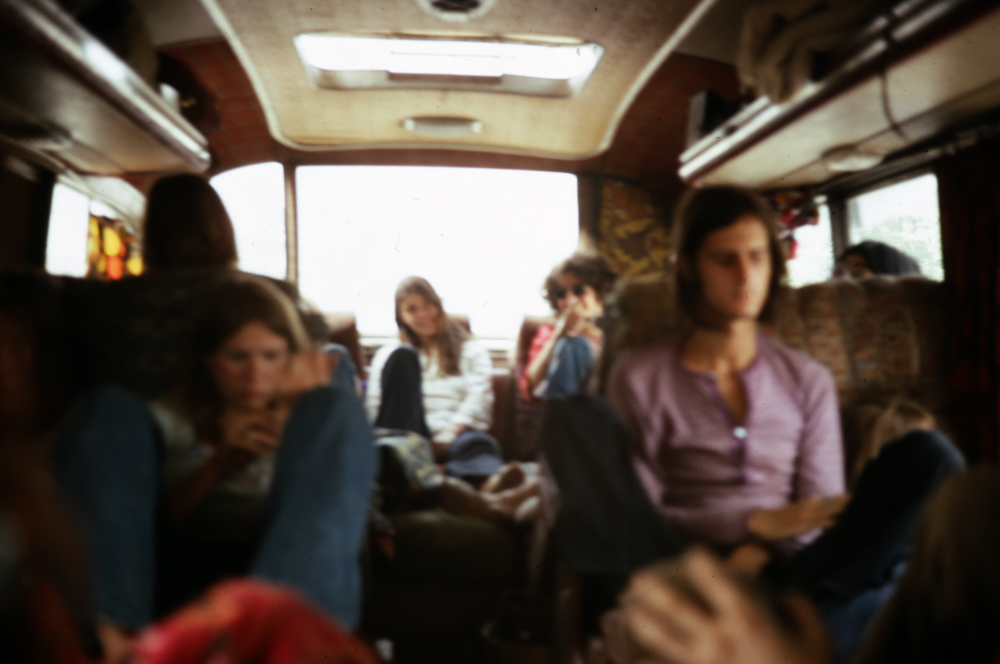
Driving across northern India in 1973, in a bus of people who came overland from Europe

To keep costs low, journeys were carried out by hitchhiking, or cheap, private buses that travelled the route. There were also trains that travelled part of the way, particularly across Eastern Europe through Turkey (with a ferry connection across Lake Van) and to Tehran or east to Mashhad, Iran. From these cities, public or private transportation could then be obtained for the remainder of the trip. The bulk of travellers were Western Europeans, North Americans, Australians, and Japanese. Ideas and experiences were exchanged in well-known hostels, hotels, and other gathering spots along the way, such as Yener's Café and The Pudding Shop in Istanbul, Sigi's on Chicken Street in Kabul or the Amir Kabir in Tehran. Many used backpacks and, while the majority were young, older people and families occasionally travelled the route. A number drove the entire distance.

== Decline of the trail ==
The hippie trail came to an end in the late 1970s with political changes in previously hospitable countries. In 1979, both the Iranian Revolution and the Soviet invasion of Afghanistan closed the overland route to South Asia for Western travellers, and Chitral and Kashmir became less inviting due to tensions and territorial conflicts in the area. Meagan Day summarized that "radio stations in Iran swapped Blue Öyster Cult for speeches by Ayatollah Khomeini." Other factors that led to difficult conditions for travellers were the Saur Revolution (1978), and the advent of a military dictatorship in Pakistan (1977) that banned many hippie attractions.

Freak Street in Kathmandu in 1987

In the Middle Eastern route, the Yom Kippur War in 1973 also put in place strict visa restrictions for Western citizens in Syria, Iraq and Lebanon. The Lebanese Civil War had already broken out in 1975. Richard Nixon started a drug war which also included cannabis. Due to the constant pressure from USA, in 1976 Nepal enacted Narcotic Drugs (Control) Act prohibiting the trade, farming or any kind of cannabis activities in the country.

Locals also became increasingly wary of Western travellers – notably in the region between Kabul and Peshawar, where residents became increasingly frightened and repulsed by unkempt hippies who were drawn to the region for its famed opium and wild cannabis.

From the mid 2000s, the route has again become somewhat feasible, but continuing conflict and tensions in Iraq and Afghanistan mean the route is much more difficult and risky to negotiate than in its heyday. In September 2007, Ozbus embarked upon a short-lived service between London and Sydney over the route of the hippie trail, and commercial trips were offered in 2010 between Europe and Asia, bypassing Iraq, Afghanistan, and Pakistan, by going through Nepal and China to the old Silk Road.

== Guides and travelogues ==
The BIT Guide, recounting collective experiences and reproduced at a fairly low cost, produced the early duplicated stapled-together "foolscap bundle" with a pink cover providing information for travellers and updated by those on the road, warning of pitfalls and places to see and stay. BIT, under Geoff Crowther (who later joined Lonely Planet), lasted from 1972 until the last edition in 1980. The 1971 edition of The Whole Earth Catalog devoted a page to the "Overland Guide to Nepal." In 1973, Tony Wheeler and his wife Maureen Wheeler produced a publication about the hippie trail called Across Asia On The Cheap. They wrote this 94-page pamphlet based upon travel experiences gained by crossing Western Europe, the Balkans, Turkey and Iran from London in a minivan. After having travelled through these regions, they sold the van in Afghanistan and continued on a succession of chicken buses, third-class trains and long-distance trucks. They crossed Pakistan, India, Nepal, Thailand, Malaysia and Indonesia and arrived nine months later in Sydney with a combined 27 cents in their pockets.

Paul Theroux wrote an account of the route in The Great Railway Bazaar (1975). Two later travel books, The Wrong Way Home (1999) by Peter Moore and Magic Bus (2008) by Rory Maclean, also retrace the original hippie trail.

== See also ==
- AH1
- Banana Pancake Trail
- Cannabis in Nepal
- Globe Trekker
- Grand Tour – 17th–19th century Continental tour undertaken by young European aristocrats, partly as leisure and partly educational
- Gringo Trail
- India–United Kingdom bus routes
- Indomania
- Oxford and Cambridge Far Eastern Expedition
- Silk Road
