= Stenmark =

Stenmark is a Swedish surname. Notable people with the surname include:

- Ingemar Stenmark (born 1956), Swedish skier
- Mikael Stenmark (born 1962), Swedish philosopher
- Rigmor Stenmark (born 1940), Swedish politician

== See also ==
- 11004 Stenmark, outer main-belt asteroid
