= Tasos Zembylas =

Tasos Zembylas (born 1962 in Nicosia, Cyprus) is a professor of Cultural Institution Studies at the University of Music and Performing Arts Vienna.

== Professional development ==
Tasos Zembylas studied philosophy, art history, and sociology at the University of Vienna from 1991 to 1997. In 1995, he was a scholarship holder at the International Research Centre for Cultural Studies (IFK) in Vienna. He subsequently worked as a freelance social scientist at various research organisations and was a lecturer in philosophy at the University of Vienna and in cultural studies at the University of Applied Arts in Vienna. In 1999, he became an assistant professor at the Institute for Cultural Management at the University of Music and Performing Arts Vienna. Following his habilitation, he was appointed associate professor of Cultural Institution Studies in 2003. In 2009, he was a visiting professor at Zeppelin University in Friedrichshafen. In 2010, he moved to the Institute for Music Sociology and, in 2021, to the Artistic Research Centre at the University of Music and Performing Arts Vienna.

Tasos Zembylas was a board member of several academic societies and associations, including the Association for Cultural Management (Fachverband Kulturmanagement), the MediaCult International Research Institute, the European Sociological Association’s Research Network Sociology of the Arts, and the Austrian Research Network on Implicit Knowledge (FORIM). He was also a member of several academic journal editorial boards.

== Research ==
Zembylas’s research focuses on the examination of theories relating to the cultural sector, the analysis of public funding for the arts in Austria, and the epistemological investigation of artistic practices and creative processes.

A fundamental question he explores centres on the emergence of the concept of art in various historical and geographical contexts. While Zembylas’s work engages with discursive developments and art theories, it also dedicates significant attention to the description and analysis of social negotiation processes, which are occasionally conflict-laden, as well as institutional practices within the art world. Consequently, he has developed a context-sensitive, practice-oriented approach to the sociology of art, which can be broadly applied.

Zembylas has noted the close connection between art production, discourses, institutions, social and cultural practices, and has drawn attention to cultural, social, political, and economic theories of the cultural sector. His theoretical work aims to develop an interdisciplinary approach to various research questions in Cultural Institution Studies. This includes inquiries into the structuring and transformation of the social organisation of the production, distribution, reception, and conservation of arts.

In addition to his theoretical investigations, Tasos Zembylas has conducted several empirical studies on the administration of public cultural funding in Austria. These studies focus on the legal principles underlying cultural funding procedures and the effects of public sector allocation policies.

The practice-theoretical approach to arts and artworlds has given rise to numerous research projects on artistic creative processes. From 2006 to 2008, Zembylas collaborated with literary scholar Claudia Dürr to investigate the literary writing process. Their research focused on the emergence and effectiveness of artistic-practical knowledge, as well as the role of professional experience of literary writers. The project culminated in the formulation of a comprehensive epistemology of artistic practice. This research approach continued for several years. Together with the music sociologist Martin Niederauer, Zembylas carried out a study from 2013 to 2015 on compositional processes in the field of contemporary art music. In this study, the focus was, amongst other things, on the materiality and processual nature of artistic creation. In addition, the synergies and interactions between different forms of knowledge were systematically examined.

Tasos Zembylas has also published a travelogue about the Monastic Republic of Athos in northern Greece. This work examines not only religious practices but also certain financial dealings of the Holy Monastery of Vatopedi, which attracted international attention in 2008 in the context of a property scandal.

== Selected works ==
=== Monographs ===
- The Social Organization of Arts – A Theoretical Compendium (with Volker Kirchberg). Vienna: mdwPress, 2025. ISBN 978-3-8376-7284-8 (open access).
- Composing Processes and Artistic Agency: Tacit Knowledge in Composing (with Martin Niederauer). London: Routledge, 2018. ISBN 978-0-367-44392-4.
- Praktiken des Komponierens. Soziologische, wissenstheoretische und musikwissenschaftliche Perspektiven (with Martin Niederauer). Wiesbaden: Springer VS, 2016. ISBN 978-3-658-13507-2.
- Die Mönchsrepublik Athos. Eine spirituelle Gesellschaft mit beschränkter Haftung. Vienna: Passagen Verlag, 2010. ISBN 978-3-85165-942-9.
- Wissen, Können und literarisches Schreiben. Eine Epistemologie der künstlerischen Praxis (with Claudia Dürr). Vienna: Passagen Verlag, 2009. ISBN 978-3-85165-913-9.
- Kulturbetriebslehre. Grundlagen einer Inter-Disziplin. Wiesbaden: VS Verlag für Sozialwissenschaften, 2004. ISBN 3-531-14314-X.
- Das Subjekt in der Malerei. Anatomie eines sterbenden Mythos. Innsbruck: StudienVerlag, 2000. ISBN 3-7065-1367-6.
- Kunst oder Nichtkunst. Über die Bedingungen und Instanzen ästhetischer Beurteilung. Vienna: WUV-Universitätsverlag, 1997. ISBN 3-85114-315-9.

=== Edited volumes ===
- Knowing in Performance. Artistic Research in Music and Performing Arts (edited with Annegret Huber, Doris Ingrisch, Therese Kaufmann, Johannes Kretz and Gesine Schröder). Bielefeld: transcript, 2021. ISBN 978-3-8376-5287-1.
- Artistic Practices. Social Interactions and Cultural Dynamics. London: Routledge, 2014. ISBN 978-0-415-72147-9.
- Die Kunst des Möglichen – Management mit Kunst. Jahrbuch Kulturmanagement 2013 (edited with the board members of the Fachverband Kulturmanagement). Bielefeld: transcript, 2013. ISBN 978-3-8376-2688-9.
- Kurt Blaukopf on Music Sociology – an Anthology. Frankfurt am Main: Peter Lang, 2012. ISBN 978-3-631-63586-5.
- Zukunft Publikum. Jahrbuch Kulturmanagement 2012 (edited with the board members of the Fachverband Kulturmanagement). Bielefeld: transcript, 2012. ISBN 978-3-8376-2285-0.
- Kunstmanagement und Kulturpolitik. Jahrbuch Kulturmanagement 2011 (edited with the board members of the Fachverband Kulturmanagement). Bielefeld: transcript, 2011. ISBN 978-3-8376-1963-8.
- Theorien für den Kultursektor. Jahrbuch Kulturmanagement 2010 (edited with the board members of the Fachverband Kulturmanagement). Bielefeld: transcript, 2010. ISBN 978-3-8376-1641-5.
- The Journal of Arts Management, Law, and Society, special issue Arts Management. A Sociological Inquiry (with Volker Kirchberg). Vol. 40, No. 1, 2010.
- Forschen im Kulturmanagement. Jahrbuch für Kulturmanagement 2009 (edited with the board members of the Fachverband Kulturmanagement). Bielefeld: transcript, 2009. ISBN 978-3-8376-1252-3.
- Kulturbetriebsforschung. Ansätze und Perspektiven der Kulturbetriebslehre (with Peter Tschmuck). Wiesbaden: VS Verlag für Sozialwissenschaften, 2006. ISBN 978-3-531-15063-5.
- Der Staat als kulturfördernde Instanz (with Peter Tschmuck). Innsbruck: StudienVerlag, 2005. ISBN 3-7065-4141-6.
- Kunst und Politik – Aspekte einer Problematik. Innsbruck: StudienVerlag, 2000. ISBN 3-7065-1412-5.
