= Peter Moores =

Peter Moores may refer to:

- Peter Moores (businessman) (1932–2016), British philanthropist
- Peter Moores (cricketer) (born 1962), former English county cricketer and England national team coach

== See also ==
- Peter Moor, Zimbabwean cricketer
- Pete or Peter Moore (disambiguation)
