= Adventures Overland =

Travel company

Adventures Overland Private Limited
- Company type: Tour operator
- Industry: Tourism
- Founded: 2012; 14 years ago
- Founders: Sanjay Madan; Tushar Agarwal
- Headquarters: Delhi, India
- Products: Escorted tours

Adventures Overland Private Limited is an Indian tourism company headquartered in Delhi. It specializes in organising annual cross-border road trips from India to London and supercar tours in Europe. In 2023, the company launched a bus service from Istanbul to London.
