= Jon Oberlander =

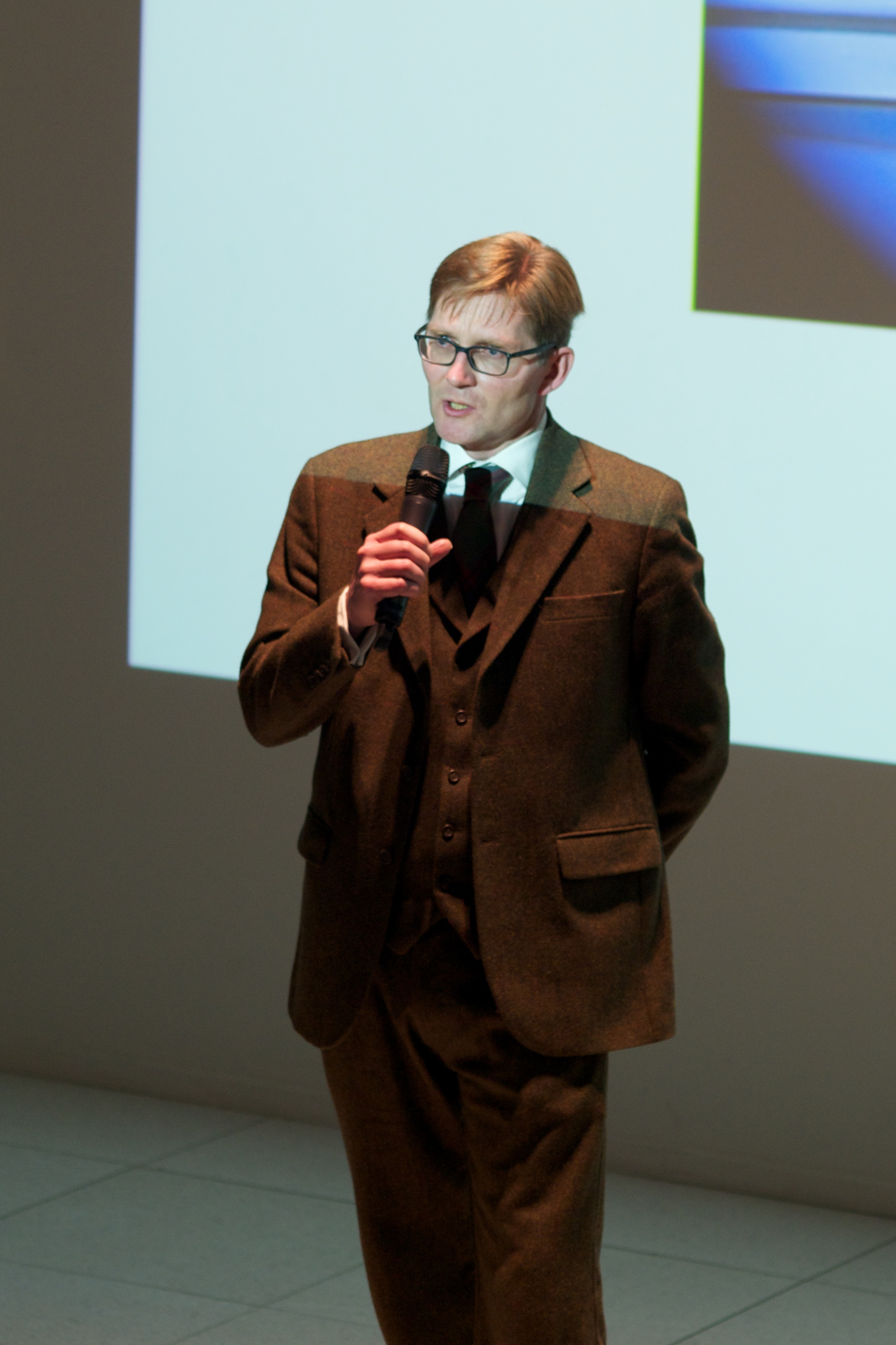
Jon Oberlander at the launch of the Take Tea With Turing digital anthology

Jon Reid Oberlander FRSE (16 June 1962 – 19 December 2017) was a British philosopher and cognitive scientist who was Professor of Epistemics at the School of Informatics, University of Edinburgh. He received a BA in Philosophy from Pembroke College, Cambridge, in 1983 and a PhD in Cognitive Science from the University of Edinburgh in 1987.

== Research ==
Oberlander described three main strands in his research: intelligent labelling; affect in communication (e.g., in research on personality types in emails with Alastair Gill); and multimodal reasoning and communication (e.g., in research with Keith Stenning on diagrammatic reasoning).

== Honours ==
In March 2016 Oberlander was elected a Fellow of the Royal Society of Edinburgh, Scotland's National Academy for science and letters, where he served as a member of their Young People's committee.
