= Erica Benner =

British political philosopher (born 1962)

Erica Benner (born 11 August 1962) is a British political philosopher.

Born in Tokyo and raised in Japan and the United Kingdom, she held academic posts at St Antony's College, Oxford, the London School of Economics, and Yale University. She was awarded a DPhil by Oxford University in 1993.

She is the author of the books Really Existing Nationalisms (Oxford University Press, 1995), Machiavelli's Ethics (Princeton University Press, 2009), Machiavelli's Prince: A New Reading (Oxford University Press, 2013) and Be Like the Fox: Machiavelli's Lifelong Quest for Freedom (Penguin Allen Lane, 2017). Be Like the Fox was described by Terry Eagleton as "lively, compulsively readable biography", chosen by Julian Baggini as one of his picks for The Guardian's best books of 2017 list, and shortlisted for the 2018 Elizabeth Longford Prize for Historical Biography. In 2024, Benner's latest book, Adventures in Democracy, was published.
