= Old Freak Street =

Street in Kathmandu, Nepal

- Freak Street
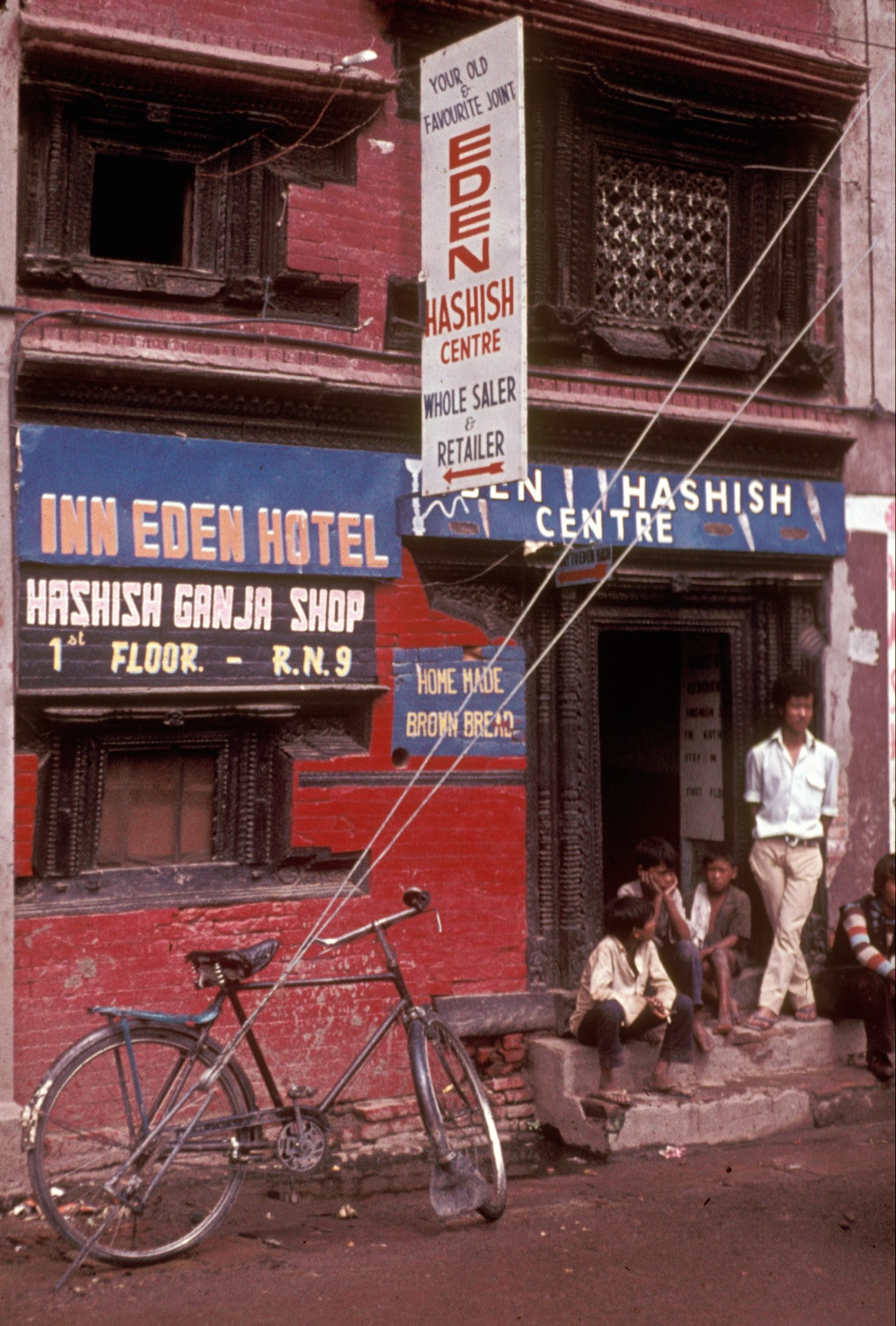
- Freak Street in 1973
- Interactive map of Old Freak Street
- Native name: Jhochhen Tole (Nepali); झोछेँ टोल (Nepali)
- Location: South of Kathmandu Durbar Square, Nepal
- Coordinates: 27.7033°N 85.3075°E

Other
- Known for: Popular destination on 1960s/1970s hippie trail, drug selling

Jhochhen Tol, (Note: Nepali: झोछेँ टोल, romanized: Jhochhen Tol, pronounced [/d͡ʑʱoːt͡ɕʰẽː t̪oːl/], simple pronunciation: JHOH-chhen TOL) popularly known as Old Freak Street or Freak Street is a small neighbourhood south of Kathmandu Durbar Square.

Presently known as Old Freak Street, this ancient street was named Freak Street during the 1970s and 1970s, when it became associated with the hippie trail.

== History ==
Freak Street was a centre in the years of the hippie trail from the early 1960s to late 1970s. The main attraction drawing tourists to Freak Street was then the government-run hashish shops. Hippies from different parts of the world travelled to Freak Street (Basantapur) in search of legal cannabis. There were also direct bus services to Freak Street from the airport and borders, targeting the hippies looking for legal smokes. Freak Street was a hippie nirvana, since marijuana and hashish were legal and sold openly in government licensed shops.

In the early 1970s, the government of Nepal started a round-up of hippies on Freak Street and deported them to India, an action propelled largely by pressure from the government of United States of America. The government imposed strict regulations for tourists regarding dress codes and physical appearances. After imposing such regulations by government the hippies felt vulnerable and the hippie movement of Nepal died out in the late 1970s. It was under this directive that the Nepali government came to ban the production and sale of hashish and marijuana in Nepal. The hippie tourism was quickly replaced by trekking and cultural tourism.

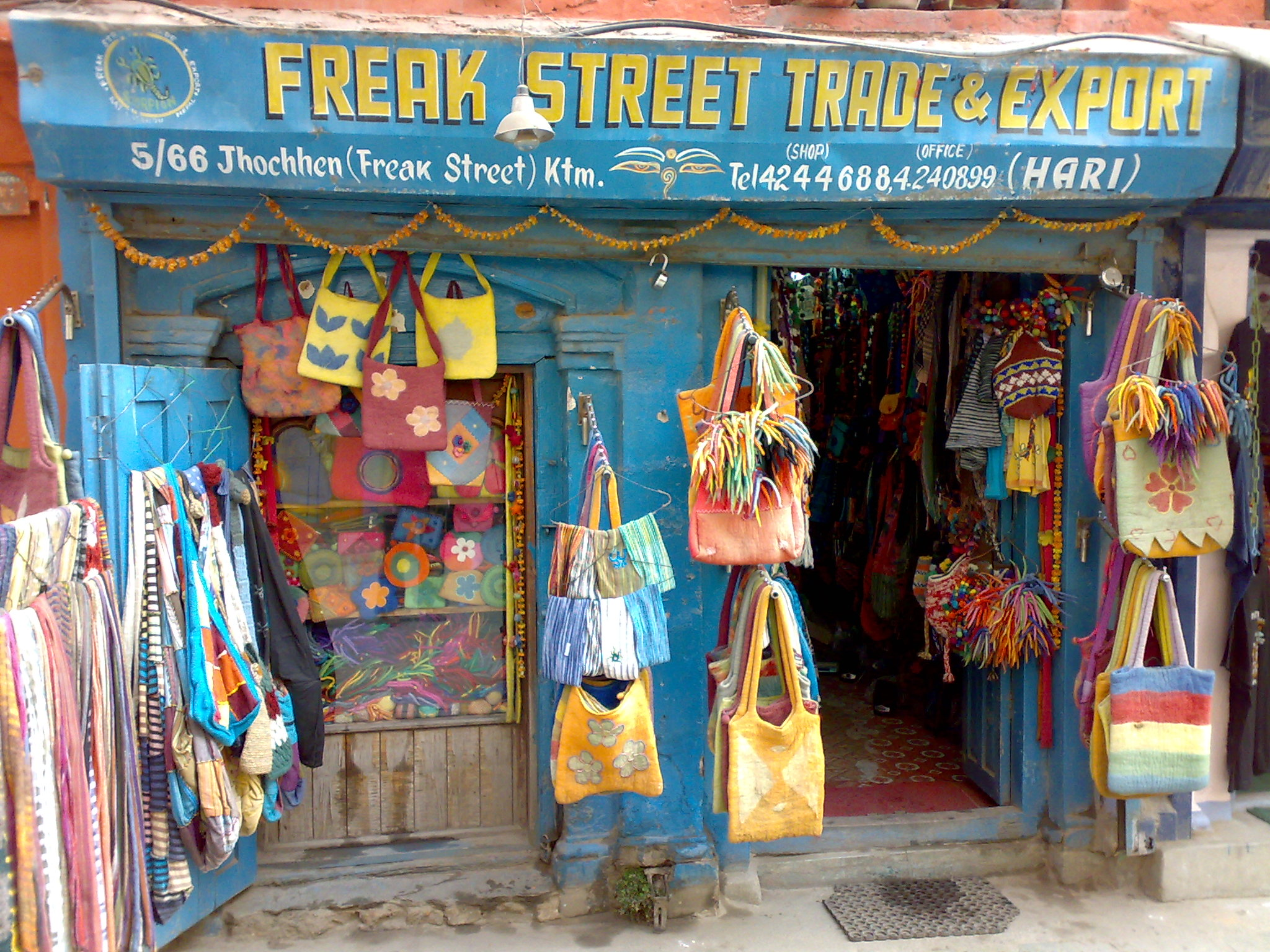
Freak Street 2009

== Culture ==
Old Freak Street's history and prime position in the heart of Kathmandu still make it a popular destination among the locals. It was once labelled as a place to find enlightenment; there have been many changes since the deportation of the hippies in the early 1970s. The street was named as Freak Street, after the hippies; its name is now Old Freak Street. This place is now just a mythical magnet for hippies and other social variants of the 1960s. Guest houses, trekking agencies, shopping centres, souvenir shops, restaurants are the businesses the local entrepreneurs have adopted after the banning of cannabis in Nepal. Overshadowed by Thamel, a primary tourist area in Kathmandu, Old Freak Street has not been able to revive its charm for tourists since then.

== See also ==
- Kathmandu Durbar Square
- Kathmandu
- Chicken Street
