= Stefan Błachowski =

Polish psychologist (1889-1962)

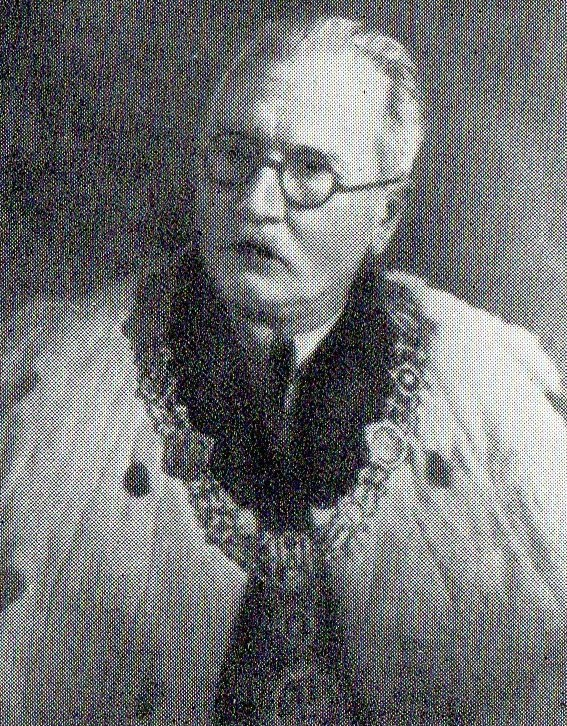
Prof. Stefan Blachowski

Stefan Błachowski (Opawa, 19 May 1889 – 31 January 1962, Warsaw, Poland) was a Polish psychologist and professor at Poznań University.

== Life ==
Błachowski was the son of a military physician, Konstanty Błachowski, and Maria Niklas. He graduated from Gymnasium no. V in Lwów (Lviv) and in 1907 began studying philosophy, psychology and philology at Lwów University. In 1909 he transferred briefly to Vienna University, then to Göttingen University (1909–13: psychology, physics, biology). In 1913 he studied biology again at Vienna and successfully defended his doctoral thesis at Göttingen.

In 1914-1919 Błachowski worked at Lwów University, where he was an assistant lecturer (starszy asystent) and from 1917 an assistant professor (docent) of philosophy, and from 1918 librarian of the university library. He spent several years (1914–16) of his employment at Lwów University at World War I fronts, and in 1918-19 he participated as a volunteer in the defense of Lwów.

In 1919 he transferred to Poznań University, where he was an associate professor (profesor nadzwyczajny), then a professor (profesor zwyczajny, 1921), director of the Chair of Psychology (1919–60), dean of Humanities (1934–37), pro-rector (1938–39 and 1945–46) and rector (1946–48). In 1945-47 he was a member of the National Council (Rada Narodowa) at the Ministry of Education (Ministerstwo Oświaty). During World War II he conducted underground teaching in Warsaw.

He did research in psychophysiology, the psychology of religion, and the psychology of memory. He was the first in Poland to conduct experimental studies of religious psychoses. He was likewise a pioneer in Polish studies of memory and mathematical abilities. He studied the role of imagination, memory, erudition, the subconscious and ideas in scientific creativity. He initiated Polish research in sports psychology.

In the 1930s Błachowski helped establish a psychology institute at Wilno University. After World War II, as pro-rector and rector of Poznań University, he rebuilt the university's psychology institute, library and professors' houses, which had been burned by the Germans.

Błachowski maintained contacts with many world authorities in psychology, including Jean Piaget.

== Works ==
Błachowski published over a hundred scientific studies, including:

- O wirtuozach liczb (1911)
- Czem jest i czem będzie psychologia (1912)
- Kilka uwag o psychologii typów matematycznych (1912)
- Pamięć a świadomość (1913)
- Zjawiska kontrastu optycznego u anormalnych trichromatów (1913)
- O pamięci, jej istocie i kształceniu (1916)
- Nastawienia i spostrzeżenia. Studium psychologiczne (1917)
- O stanie i potrzebach organizacyjnych psychologii w Polsce (1918)
- Problem myślenia bez słów (1918)
- Chronometryczne badania nad przebiegiem startu (1924)
- O szkole dla uzdolnionych (1924)
- Struktura typów wyobrażeniowych (1925)
- W sprawie analizy wybitnych zdolności rachunkowych (1925)
- Kłamstwo (1932)
- Wyniki psychologii pedagogicznej (1934)
- O sztucznych ekstazach i widzeniach (1938)

== Memberships ==
- Correspondent (1946), member (1948), Polish Academy of Learning.
- Poznań Society of Friends of Learning (1920).
- Co-founder, Polish Anthropological Society (1925).
- Co-founder, Poznań Psychological Society (1930).
- President, Polish Psychological Association (1948 till his death).
- Vice president, Polish Society for Psychological Hygiene (1959–61).
- Honorary member, Polish Psychiatric Association and Czech Psychotechnic Association.
- Participant, International Psychological Congresses in Berlin, Copenhagen, Moscow, Paris, Prague, Barcelona and Vienna.
- Officer's and Commander's Crosses of the Order of Polonia Restituta.

== See also ==
- History of philosophy in Poland
- List of Poles—Social sciences
- List of Poles—Philosophy
