= Peter Moore (photographer) =

American photographer

- Born: London, United Kingdom
- Died: September 28, 1993; New York, New York
- Occupation: photographer
- Spouse: Barbara Moore
- Children: 2

Peter Moore (1932 – September 28, 1993) was a British-American photographer associated with documenting the avant-garde art, dance, music, and theater events of the 1960s NYC, capturing countless performances and exhibitions of the Fluxus movement, Happenings, and Judson Memorial Church.

== Biography ==
Moore was born in London, England, and attended Haverford College and the Massachusetts Institute of Technology in the 1950s before working at Life Magazine. During the 1960s he documented hundreds of performances, saying "if I don't record these, they'll be lost." From 1978 to 1989, he was the technical editor and columnist for Modern Photography magazine. He captured significant productions by Robert Wilson (director) and Philip Glass, such as the premiere of Einstein on the Beach.

Over 20,000 master contact sheets and color slides of photographs taken by Peter Moore have been archived at Northwestern University.

== Exhibitions ==
A large selection of Moore’s photographs were on view at the Museum of Modern Art in the exhibition “Judson Dance Theater: The Work Is Never Done” (2018–2019), with dozens of exhibits in the decades prior. These include:

- 1970 - “Happenings and Fluxus” at the Kölnischer Kunstverein in Cologne, Germany
- 1978 - “Alternative Gestures: Another Look at Dance Photography” at P.S. 1, Long Island City, New York
- 1990 - the Fluxus pavilion at the Venice Biennale
- 1993 - “In the Spirit of Fluxus” at the Walker Art Center, Minneapolis
- 1993 - the 2nd Lyon Biennale (1993)
- 2003 - “Art, Lies and Videotape” at Tate Liverpool
- 2004 - “Simone Forti. Thinking with the Body: A Retrospective in Motion” at the Museum der Moderne in Salzburg
- 2014-15 - “The City Lost and Found: Capturing New York, Chicago, and Los Angeles: 1960-1980” at the Art Institute of Chicago
- 2017 - 14th Lyon Biennale
- 2018-19 - “Judson Dance Theater: The Work Is Never Done” at the Museum of Modern Art
- 2022 - "Peter Moore: Festive Years" at the Paula Cooper Gallery
