= Chicken Street =

Street in Kabul, Afghanistan

- Chicken Street
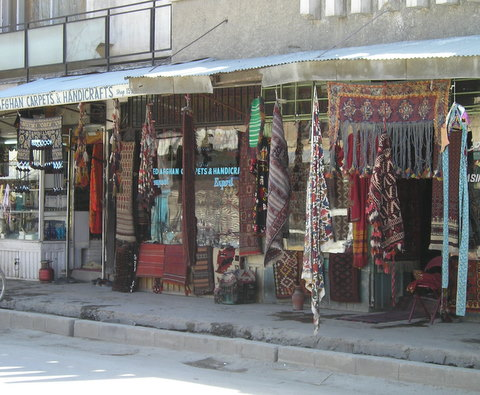
- A shop on Chicken Street
- Native name: Koch-e Murgha کوچه مرغ (Dari)
- Location: Between Zargona Road and Shahrara Road, Kabul, Afghanistan
- Coordinates: 34.5282°N 69.1702°E

Other
- Known for: Popular destination on 1960s/1970s hippie trail; popular destination amongst foreigners in the 2000s

Chicken Street (Dari: کوچه مرغ Koch-e Murgha) is a narrow street located in the Shahr-e Naw district of Kabul east of the Asamayi. It has been an iconic shopping street in the city and popular with foreigners, famous for its carpets, handicrafts and antiques.

== History ==
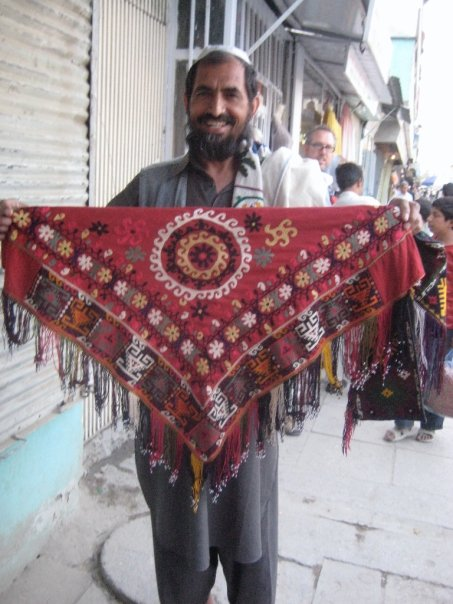
A salesman on Chicken Street

Chicken Street was the major attraction for foreigners during the Hippie trail from the 1960s to late 1970s. Afghan coats, bracelets and plenty of hashish made it popular. Hippies would also smoke opium here. Along with hotels, it provided items for the travelers to use en route towards Kathmandu. The street and tourism in general declined with the start of the Soviet–Afghan War.

Following the United States invasion of Afghanistan and the influx of foreign diplomats and other visitors, the street was thriving again for it became a popular place for Afghan souvenirs. Traditional Afghan rugs and lapis lazuli stones were popular with shoppers. Emerald, rubies, exotic food and artists selling paintings are among the other attractions on offer. However the departure of most foreign NATO troops by 2014 led to a significant downturn in business. Security issues have also hampered business.

Despite its name, the street is not known for its sale of chickens; those are sold on the adjacent Flower Street.

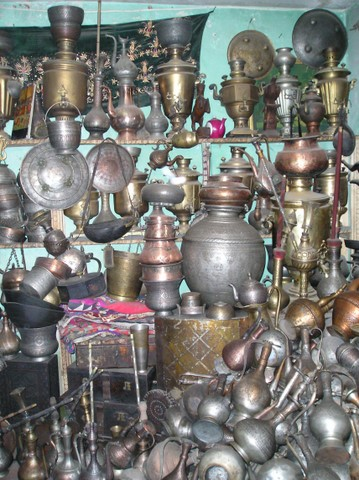
Antiquities on Chicken Street

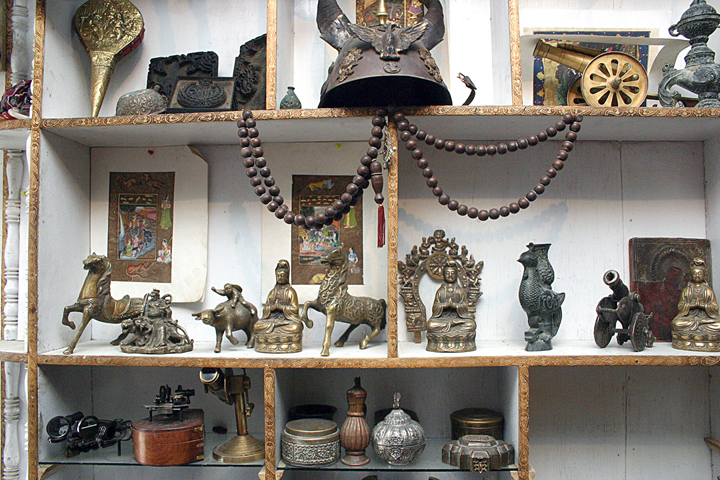
Antiquities on Chicken Street

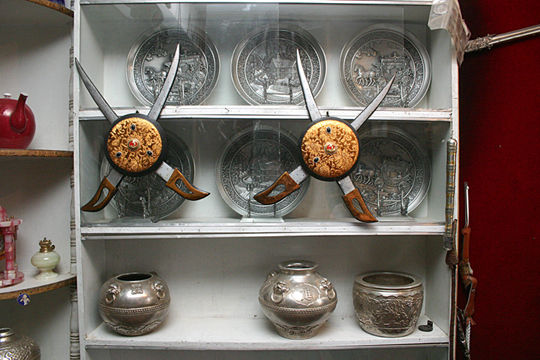
Antiquities on Chicken Street

== In popular culture ==
Chicken Street was the subject of the eponymous 2005 novel by Amanda Sthers.

The street is featured in the 2007 documentary film 16 Days in Afghanistan.

== See also ==
- Freak Street
