= Anastasio Cuschieri =

Anastastio Cuschieri
- Born: 27 January 1876; Valletta, Malta
- Died: 25 July 1962 (aged 86); Valletta, Malta
- Occupations: Poet; philosopher; politician

Anastastio Cuschieri (1876–1962) was a Maltese poet, politician, and philosopher. He held the Chair of Philosophy at the University of Malta (1901–39). In philosophy he was mostly interested in ethics.

== Life ==
=== Beginnings ===
Cuschieri was born at Valletta, Malta, on 27 January 1876. He joined the Carmelite Order on 25 April 1891, at 19 years of age. That same year he began pursuing his institutional studies in philosophy and theology at the University of Malta. He made his religious profession on 28 August 1892. On completion of his university courses in 1898, Cuschieri was ordained a priest, and sent to Rome, Italy, to pursue studies in philosophy and theology at the Jesuits' Gregorian University. In 1901 he became a Doctor of Philosophy and a Doctor of Theology.

=== Chair of philosophy ===
On his return to Malta in 1901, Cuschieri was immediately appointed professor of philosophy at the University of Malta. Here just a year later, in 1902, he was elevated to the chair of philosophy, an office he occupied for 30 years. During this time, while busy teaching philosophy at the university, as a gifted orator he was frequently called upon to address various gatherings, and he was particularly popular to deliver religious orations. Twice was he chosen as a provincial superior of the Maltese Carmelites (1906–10; 1913–16).

=== Poetry ===
Culturally, Cuschieri was utterly in love with the Italian language and the Latin culture. For many years he was one of the examiners of the Italian language and Italian literature. Many of his earliest poems were in Italian, and continued to write refined Italian poems all his life. A collection of these appeared in Oreste Tencajoli's Poeti Maltesi d'Oggi (Rome, 1932). Nevertheless, Cuschieri also wrote perceptive poems in the Maltese language, especially from 1909 onwards (after being heartily encourage by Napoleon Tagliaferro). These he published in various cultural and religious periodicals. Due to his beautiful poems lauding the Maltese language, he became known as il-poeta tal-kelma Maltija (the poet of the Maltese idiom). Nonetheless, in religious circles he also became known as il-poeta tal-Madonna (the poet of the Blessed Virgin).

=== Politics ===
Cuschieri was also engaged in party politics. His early commitments were characterised by his love of the Latin culture, and, together with others, decided that Malta's own culture should be defined in Latin, rather than in Anglo-Saxon, terms. This pitched him against the Protestant British colonial government of Malta. Nonetheless, his political commitment had a pronounced social edge. In 1921, when his political activity became more manifest, he was encouraged by a visit to Malta made by the Jesuit Charles Plater to accept an invitation by the Unione Cattolica San Giuseppe (St. Joseph Catholic Workers' Union) to become the first Director of a Study Club which had the intention of educating workers. This society was domesticated by the Catholic Church to keep workers away from socialist teachings and action. This was in harmony with Cuschieri's conservative politics.

After 1921 Cuschieri's political engagements continued to grow gradually. The rise to power of Benito Mussolini in Italy in 1922 made him, and many others in Malta, look to fascism with increasing fascination and appeal. Like many other Neo-Thomists, Cuschieri saw great congruence between the Scholastics' philosophical position and the Italian philosophy of fascism. By time, Cuschieri became an overt and avowed Fascist, and this was recognised both in Malta and in Italy. In 1932, Cuschieri was elected to parliament on behalf of the pro-Italian (but never officially fascist) Nationalist Party as a representative of university graduates.

=== Philosophy ===
Cuschieri was an accomplished adherent of Scholasticism of the Aristotelico-Thomist type. Throughout his life, by training and by vocation, he was always part of the orthodox branch of this school. Though he was versed in the writings and doctrines of Thomas Aquinas, he never harboured or cultivated a thoroughly speculative mind, even if he seems to have been quite capable of subtleties and abstruse distinctions. Nonetheless, his inclination tended more to the applicability of Thomistic and Scholastic principles, especially to cater for his audiences in the pastoral fields.

In his own way, even ideologically, Cuschieri was somehow part of the Neo-Thomistic movement that grew after the wake of Pope Leo XIII's pontificate, who gave great impetus, mainly for political reasons, to the movement. All of this, however, ended with World War II, up till which Thomist Scholastics carried on a sort of love-affair with fascism, and this suited Cuschieri very well.

=== Last years and death ===
After the fall of fascism and the end of the war, Cuschieri proceeded with his pastoral and academic work. Throughout his life he loved sports, especially football. Nevertheless, when he grew older, he preferred to play billiards, especially at the Civil Service Sports Club of which he was a member. Alternatively, he cherished frequenting friends, especially members of the Akkademja tal-Malti (Academy of the Maltese Language), and discussing current affairs, literature and philosophy.

On 15 August 1959 Cuschieri suffered a grave setback in his health. He had become bed-bound at the Carmelite convent at Valletta, and gradually grew paralysed. His ailment and sufferings continued for three years. On 17 July 1962 he was administered the last rites, and eight days later, on 25 July 1962, he died.

== Works ==
A collection of Cuschieri's poetry was published in 2012. Excluding his poetry, Cuschieri otherwise published very little in his lifetime. Nevertheless, a large number of manuscripts still exist. These were kept in his personal possession, and later passed on into the archive of the Carmelites at Valletta. Most of them were typed by Cuschieri himself, and sometimes annotated in his own hand. All are in Italian. The writings which contain philosophical content (that is, excluding the purely religious or devotional essays) are, namely, the following:

=== Published ===
- 1905 – Di alcune proprietà del genio (On some properties of the intellect). An article in Italian published in Malta Letteraria discussing the Scholastic properties and functions of human reasoning.
- 1913–15 – Three articles in Italian published in Italy's Rivista di Filosofia Neo-Scolastica:
  - A proposito del problema criteriologico (Concerning the criteriological problem).
  - Il problema criteriologico o il problema ontologico (The criteriological problem or the ontological problem).
  - A proposito di soluzioni e problemi (Concerning solutions and problems).

The articles were composed in response, and opposition, to Benedetto Croce's idealism concerning the criteria of truth (or 'criteriology', as the Scholastics used to call them). The compositions came under the scrutiny of Scholastics such as Angelo Pirotta and other foreign Thomistic heavy-weights.

- 1915 – In Morte di Napoleone Tagliaferro (On the Death of Napoleon Tagliaferro). A 16-page pamphlet in Italian published in Malta (Daily Malta Chronicle) which reproduces a talk Cuschieri delivered at the aula magna of the University of Malta on 4 November 1915, in a ceremony commemorating the archaeologist, philologist, mathematician, and writer Napoleon Tagliaferro who had recently died. Cuschieri focuses mainly on love of country.
- 1919 – Per la Messa Novella di Goffredo Lubrano (For the Solemn Mass of Goffredo Lubrano). A 17-page pamphlet in Italian published in Malta (Scuola Tip. Salesiana, Sliema) which reproduces a talk which Cuschieri delivered at the Senglea parish church on 21 September 1919, during the first mass of the newly ordained Doctor of Law, Goffredo Lubrano. Cuschieri's talk was mainly about the importance of Christians' commitment towards the poor and the oppressed.

=== Manuscripts ===
Undated

  - Cittadino del secolo vigesimo (Citizen of the 20th Century).
  - Doveri dell'uomo (Duties of man).
  - I benefici della scienza nei riguardi della maternità (The benefits of science in relation to maternity).
  - Il cielo o la terra? (Heaven or earth?).
  - Il concetto logico secondo S. Tommaso e Benedetto Croce (The logical concept according to St. Thomas Aquinas and Benedetto Croce).
  - Il dogma dell'Immacolata (The dogma of the Immaculate Conception).
  - Il dovere (Duty).
  - Il proprio dovere (One's proper duty).
  - La conversione di un'anima (The conversion of a soul).
  - La lega (The league).
  - La materia e lo sprito (Matter and spirit).
  - La realtà della metafisica contro E. Kant (The reality of metaphysics according to E. Kant).
  - La scelta delle lingue (The choice of languages).
  - La storia e la lotta della vita (History and the toil of life).
  - Le tentazioni (The temptations).
  - Malta Cattolica (Catholic Malta).
  - Massabielle (Massabielle).
  - Pace, Pace (Peace, Peace).
  - Panigirico del naufragio di S. Paolo (Oration for the shipwreck of St. Paul).
  - Povera vita dell'uomo! (Poor life of Man!).
  - Resistere e combattere (Resist and fight).
  - Una parola d'amore (A word of love).
  - Una vita felice (A happy life).

Dated

  - 1909 – Il dovere della prova (The duty of trying).
  - 1910 – Dopo la laurea (After graduation).
  - 1921 – Solenne incoronazione della Vergine detta volgarmente la Bambina (Solemn incoronation of the Blessed Virgin commonly called the Child).
  - 1922 – Inaugurazione della lapide a Fortunato Mizzi (Inauguration of the plaque in honour of Fortunato Mizzi).
  - 1927 – Inaugurazione della Terza Legislatura (Inauguration of the Third Legislature).
  - 1932 – Inaugurazione del monumento a Fra Diego (Inauguration of the monument to Fra Diego).

== See also ==
- Philosophy in Malta
