= Angelo Pirotta =

Maltese philosopher and Dominican priest (1894–1956)

The Reverend Angelo Pirotta OP
- Born: 27 December 1894; Naxxar, Malta
- Died: 16 November 1956 (aged 61); Naxxar, Malta
- Occupations: Dominican priest; philosopher
- Parent(s): John Mary Pirotta (1867–1946) and Antonia née Camilleri (1875–1929)

Angelo Pirotta, O.P. (27 December 1894 – 16 November 1956) was a Maltese philosopher, Dominican priest and educator. In philosophy, his areas of specialization were epistemology and metaphysics.

== Life ==
=== Early life ===
Pirotta was born in Naxxar, Malta. His parents were John Mary Pirotta (1867–1946) and Antonia Née Camilleri (1875–1929). He was the oldest of thirteen children, three of whom died in infancy.

Pirotta was first privately schooled by Canon Fortunato De Bono. He then attended the Lyceum, a government-owned high school for boys in Valletta until the age of 16. Following that, he joined the Dominican Order on 30 April 1911.

=== Initial Formation ===
In Rabat, Malta, Pirotta began his novitiate, and then, a year later, made his three-year profession on 12 May 1912. Thereafter, he began his institutional studies: three years of philosophy (1912–15), and four of theology (1915–19), all according to the Thomist tradition.

After completing his second year of theology (1916/17), Pirotta was chosen to continue his theological studies at Pontifical International Angelicum College in Rome, the future Pontifical University of Saint Thomas Aquinas, Angelicum. In the meantime, he was ordained as a priest on 22 September 1917 at the St. John's Co-Cathedral, Valletta, Malta.

In Rome, Pirotta resided at the Angelicum College. After his two years of theology (1917–19), he successfully sat for his Lectorate exams on 1 July 1919 with a dissertation titled De Reali Distinctione inter Essentiam et Esse in Creatis (The Real Distinction between Essence and Existence in Created Being). Thereafter, he proceeded with his post-graduate studies in philosophy (1919–21). Meanwhile, he also prepared his doctorate thesis, entitled De Supposto et Persona, which he successfully defended on 1 July 1921.

=== The Italy years ===
==== In Viterbo ====
Pirotta's first academic assignment was at Viterbo, where he spent five academic years (1921–26) teaching the history of philosophy, natural science (also called ‘physics’), and theodicy (theologia fundamentalis; now called natural theology). He was invited on different occasions to address the Circulus Philosophicus (Philosophical Discussion Group) and was also asked to contribute to Thomistic periodicals, read sermons, and give speeches. At Viterbo, Pirotta also prepared his first major publication: an exposition of Aquinas’ commentary on Aristotle's De Anima (On the Soul).

==== In Rome ====
After Viterbo, Pirotta returned to Rome to assume a teaching post at the Angelicum College where he remained for two years (1926-28), teaching philosophy, theodicy, logic, and ontology. In terms of literary production, Pirotta's Roman years may be considered as his most prolific and industrious period, during which he wrote reviews, scientific articles, and prepared and published his second major work: another exposition on Aquinas’ commentaries on Aristotle's De Sensu et Sensato (On Sense and Sensibility) and De Memoria et Reminiscientia (On Memory and Remembrance).

==== Interlude in Malta ====
In 1928, Pirotta returned temporarily to his homeland when one of his brothers became seriously ill, and his mother was ill and died on 5 July 1929. While in Malta, Pirotta spent two academic years (1928–1930), residing and lecturing at Rabat, Malta. Pirotta taught philosophy, the history of philosophy, and apologetics. He also continued to publish scientific reviews and articles.

==== In Fiesole ====
Back in Italy, Pirotta was sent to the college of Fiesole, near Florence, Italy. The private college prepared Dominican students for the priesthood. Pirotta stayed there for one academic year (1930–1931), where he taught the history of philosophy and the treatise on divine revelation.

Here he also worked upon the first of his six-volume Summa Philosophiæ (The Sum of Philosophy), which he published in 1931. He also prepared for the completion of his master's degree. The final exam was successfully held on 7 May 1931, in Rome at the Angelicum College, which by that time had been upgraded to the status of an international university. As it was the usual practice, the title was conferred four years later: the official investiture was held at the Dominican Priory at Rabat, Malta on 24 November 1935.

==== In Naples ====
After Tuscany, Pirotta went to Naples. He joined the faculty at the Aquinas College of the Dominicans as a Rector (‘Lectorem Primarium’). He stayed there for three consecutive academic years (1931–1934). In Naples, Pirotta may have been at the peak of his academic career as there he published the first of his planned six-volume Summa Philosophæ: a study about Aristotelico-Thomistic logic, called the Philosophia Rationalis (Rational Philosophy). Later, he proceeded to publish his third exposition: this time of Aquinas’ commentary on Aristotle's Ethicorum ad Nichomachum (Nicomachean Ethics).

=== In Malta ===
In 1934, Pirotta was recalled to Rabat. During the first academic year (1934–1935), he was a lecturer of philosophy. In 1935 he was chosen to be the Rector of the college and retained this office for nine years (1935–1944), which included the World War II years in Malta.

At the beginning of the 1935–1936 academic year, Pirotta was officially conferred his master's degree. A few months later, he issued his second volume of the Summa Philosophiæ, the one dealing with natural philosophy, called Philosophia Naturalis.

In 1938, Pirotta applied for the Deanship of philosophy at the Royal University of Malta, but he was unsuccessful. From 1939 until his death in 1956, he lived most of his time in Naxxar, Malta, and stayed at his convent in Rabat, Malta as little as possible.

In Rabat, continuing as Rector, from 1939 onwards, he acted as supplementary examiner at the Royal University of Malta, and further continued to deliver sermons here and there, and even to hear confessions on a regular basis.

=== Retirement and death ===
Before the war was over, at the end of the academic year of 1943–1944, Pirotta was relieved of the post of Rector at Rabat, Malta. During these years, he worked on his next publication, which turned out to be his last. This was his fourth exposition, on Aquinas’ eight books of commentaries on Aristotle's De Physico Auditu (Physics), which was published in 1953.

In 1955, Pirotta became victim of acute cerebral vascular insufficiency due to diabetes and chronic smoking. As a result, his memory had become seriously impaired, and so was his reasoning powers. He died at his parents’ home at Naxxar on 16 November 1956, a month short of his 62nd birthday. He was buried in the Dominican church of Our Lady of the Grotto at Rabat.

== Works ==
=== Opus magnum ===
- The Summa Philosophiæ Aristotelico-Thomisticæ (The Sum of Aritotelico-Thomistic Philosophy) – Pirotta planned to publish six volumes to complete this work. He succeeded in publishing only the first two. The other four volumes remained manuscripts in different phases of preparation.
  - VOL. I – Philosophia Rationalis (Rational Philosophy; 1931) – Published in Latin, containing 267 pages (and twelve preliminary pages), the book was published by Marietti of Turin, Italy. It is the first volume of Pirotta's incomplete Summa Philosophiæ project. It opens with a preface and a general introduction to philosophy; and closes with a chart that shows the classification of the philosophical sciences according to the Aristotelico-Thomistic school of thought.
  - VOL. II – Philosophia Naturalis (Natural Philosophy; 1936) – The second volume of the incomplete Summa project took five years to finalize. This book, also in Latin as most of Pirotta's writings, contains 820 pages, excluding the eight preliminary pages. Like the first volume, it was published with Marietti of Turin, Italy.
  - VOL. III – Metaphysica Ostensiva Generalis seu Ontologia (General Demonstrative Metaphysics or Ontology; c.1935-40) – This volume in the series presented Pirotta's work on metaphysics. It was never published, though its manuscript shows that it was in an advanced state of composition.
  - VOL. IV – Metaphysica Ostensiva Specialis: Metaphysica Entis Creati (Specific Demonstrative Metaphysics: the Metaphysics of Created Being; c.1935-40) – This writing, intended to be the fourth volume in a series of six forming the Summa Philosophiæ Aristotelico-Thomisticæ, was never completed. The manuscript is made up of 580 large folios.
  - VOL. V – Metaphysica Ostensiva Specialis: Metaphysica Entis Increati sive Theologia Naturalis seu Theodicea (Specific Demonstrative Metaphysics: the Metaphysics of Uncreated Being otherwise Natural Theology or Theodicy; c.1935-40)– out of the four incomplete manuscripts of Pirotta's Summa Philosophiæ Aristotelico-Thomisticæ, this is the most complete. It is a matter of speculation whether Pirotta actually intended to publish this fifth volume before the third and fourth. The manuscript is made up of 569 folios.
  - VOL. VI – Metaphysica Defensiva seu Critica (Explicative Metaphysics or Criteriology; c.1935-40) – The entirety of the extant manuscript comprises 1260 large folios, however this is the most incomplete of Pirotta's series of manuscripts related to his Summa Philosophiæ Aristotelico-Thomisticæ. Some segments of it are finalized.

=== Commentaries ===
Apart from Pirotta's two published volumes that were part of his Summa Philosophiæ Aristotelico-Thomisticæ, published in 1931 and 1936 respectively, these commentaries are considered by some to be his best works.

- Commentarium De Anima ([Aquinas’] Commentary on [Aristotle's] ‘On the Soul’; 1925) – Written in Latin, its 307 pages (excluding the thirteen preliminary pages), was published with Marietti of Turin, Italy. Its full title is: Sancti Thomæ Aquinatis Doctoris Angelici Ord. Præd. In Aristotelis Librum De Anima Commentarium (The Commentary of St. Thomas Aquinas, the Angelic Doctor of the Order of Preachers, on Aristotle's Book On the Soul). The volume is dedicated to Mons. Angelo Portelli O.P., Malta's then Auxiliary Bishop. The Dominican archive at Rabat, Malta, possesses the galley proofs for a new edition of the work, which was never published. Essentially, Pirotta's work is a commentary on Aquinas’ exposition of Aristotle's On the Soul.
- De Sensu et Sensato – De Memoria et Reminiscientia ([Aquinas’ Commentary on Aristotle's] ‘On Sense and Sensibility’ [and] ‘On Memory and Remembrance’; 1928) – A book in Latin published with Marietti of Turin, Italy, that comprises nine preliminary, and a further 158 pages. Its full title is: Sancti Thomæ Aquinatis Doctoris Angelici Ord. Præd. In Aristotelis Libros De Sensu et Sensato De Memoria et Reminiscentia Commentarium (The Commentary of St. Thomas Aquinas, the Angelic Doctor of the Order of Preachers, on Aristotle's Books On Sense and Sensibility [and] On Memory and Remembrance). The book is dedicated to Fortunato De Bono, a Maltese early teacher of Pirotta. The writing is an interpretation of Aquinas’ exposition of Aristotle's two works.
- Ethicorum Aristotelis ad Nichomachum ([Aquinas’ Exposition of] Aristotle's ‘Nicomachean Ethics’; 1934) – This publication follows on Pirotta's two commentaries on Aquinas's exposition of Aristotle's On the Soul, and On Sense and On Memory.
- In the intervening years, Pirotta had also published his first volume of his Sum of Philosophy. This volume of 696 pages, excluding the twenty-four preliminary pages, was also published with Marietti of Turin, Italy. Its full title is: Sancti Thomæ Aquinatis Doctoris Angelici Ord. Præd. In Decem Libros Ethicorum Aristotelis ad Nicomachum Expositio (The Exposition of Saint Thomas Aquinas, Angelic Doctor of the Order of Preachers, on the Ten Books of Aristotle's Nicomachean Ethics).
- In Octo Libri De Physico Auditu sive Physicorum Aristotelis Commentaria ([Aquinas’] Eight Books on [Aristotle's] ‘Physics’ or [Aquinas’] Commentary of Aristotle's ‘Physics’; 1953) – This is the last of Pirotta's major contributions to scholastic philosophy, published barely three years before his death. The study, in Latin, is made up of 658 pages, and was published by M. D’Auria Pontificius Editor of Naples, Italy. The book is divided into eight books, and then into lectures (lectio).

=== Articles ===
Unlike the commentaries, these articles take up some point or aspect of a particular theme on which Pirotta expands upon. After publication, most of these articles have been distributed as separate extracts.

- ‘L’Arma taghna’ (Our weapon; 1918; signed only as Fr. A.P. o.p.)
- ‘Is-seba’ viaggi dulurusi ta Sidna Gesù Cristu’ (The seven sorrowful walks of Our Lord Jesus Christ; 1919) – Edited and republished in 2012 by Joseph Vassallo
- ‘Dialogu fuk it-tghallim nisrani’ (A dialogue on Christian teaching; 1920–21)
- ‘Zamboni, Kant et S. Thomas’ (Zamboni, Kant and St. Thomas [Aquinas]; 1925)
- ‘De unione immediata animæ rationalis ut talis cum corpore’ (On the immediate union of the rational soul as such with the body; 1925)
- ‘De dualismo transcendentali in philosophia S. Thomæ’ (On transcendental dualism in the philosophy of St. Thomas [Aquinas]; 1925–28)
- ‘Ulterior explanatio doctrinæ de anima humana ut forma substatiali corporis’ (Further explanation on the doctrine of the human soul as a substantial form of the body; 1926)
- ‘De metaphysicæ defensivæ natura secundum doctrinam aristotelico-thomisticam’ (On the nature of explicative metaphysics according to Aristotelico-Thomistic teaching; 1927)
- ‘De Trascendentalitate Summæ Theologicæ S. Thomæ’ (On transcendentality in the ‘Sum of Theology’ of St. Thomas [Aquinas]; 1928)
- ‘De methodologia theologiæ scholasticæ’ (On the methodology of scholastic theology; 1929)
- ‘Disputatio de potentia obedientiali iuxta thomisticam doctrinam’ (Argument on the submission of potency according to Thomistic teachings; 1929–30)
- ‘De vitæ genesi’ (On the origin of life; 1932)
- ‘De philogenesi’ (On the impulse towards generation [or Philogenesis]; 1934)
- ‘Escatelogiæ seu Eudæmonologiæ creaturæ intellectualis lineamenta iuxta Cajetani doctrinam’ (Eschatology or A Review of Cajetan's Doctrine of the Eudemonology of Intellectual Beings; 1935)
- ‘De sacerdotii dignitate’ (On the dignity of the priest; 1947)

=== Scientific reviews ===
- The 1923 editions of Filosofia Neo-Scolastica – Milan (1923)
- Mons. F. Olgiati, L’Anima di S. Tommaso (The Soul of St. Thomas [Aquinas]; 1924)
- The 1924 editions of Scientia – Bologna (1924)
- The 1924 edition of Scientia – Bologna (1925)
- The 1924-25 editions of Divus Thomas - Piacenza (1926)
- The 1925 editions of Filosofia Neo-Scolastica – Milan (1926)
- Two volumes of La Scuola Cattolica – Milan (1926)
- The 1926 editions of Divus Thomas – Piacenza (1927)
- The 1926 editions of Logos – Naples (1927)
- M. Cordovani O.P., Il Rivelatore (1927)
- Mons. J. Bittremieux, De Mediatione Universali B.M. Virginis quoad gratias (The Grace [received] through the Universal Mediation of the Bl. Virgin Mary; 1927)
- E. Chiochetti, 2nd ed. of La Filosofia di Giovanni Gentile (The Philosophy of Giovanni Gentile; 1928)
- G. B. Phelan, Feeling Experience and its Modalities (1928)
- C. Petroccia, Lux et Pax in Synthesi Dogmatica (Light and Peace in a Dogmatic Key; 1928)
- Mons. J. Van der Meersch, Tractatus de Deo Uno et Trino (Treatise on the One and Triune God; 1929)
- J. Maréchal S.J., 2nd ed. of Le Point de Départ de la Métaphysique (The Starting Point of Metaphysics; 1929)
- R. Jolivet, La Notion de Substance (The Notion of Substance; 1930)
- Mons. J. Bittremieux, Doctrina Mariana Leonis XIII (The Marian doctrine of [Pope] Leo XIII 1930)

=== Manuscripts ===
Most of the following texts are incomplete.

- De Persona seu Supposito (On the Person or the [Whole] Subject; 1921)
- Introductio in Totam Philosophiam seu Prælectiones Philosophicæ Aristotelico-Thomisticæ (An Introduction to the Whole of [Aristotelico-Thomistic] Philosophy or An Explanation of Aristotelico-Thomistic Philosophy; c.1921)
- Historia Philosophiæ (History of Philosophy; 1921–25)
- Logica Formalis (Formal Logic; 1922)
- Logica Materialis (Material Logic; 1922)
- De Anima Vegetativa (On the Vegetative Soul; 1922)
- De Anima Sensitiva (On the Sensitive Soul; 1922)
- De Anima Intellectiva (On the Intellectual Soul; 1922–23)
- De Potentia Appetitiva Intellectus (On the Appetitive Power of Intellect; 1923)
- Philosophia Entis ut Ens seu Metaphysica ([The] Philosophy on Being as Being or Metaphysics; 1923)
- Lezioni di Fisiologia Anatomica (Lectures on Anatomic Physiology; 1923)
- Philosophia Naturalis (Natural Philosophy; 1924)
- Apologetica (Apologetics; 1926)
- Commentaria (Commentaries; c.1935-40)
- De Idealismo Schellinghii (On Schelling's Idealism; c.1935-40)
- Hegelii Impugnatio (Hegel Contested; c.1935-40)
- De Solipsismo (On Solipsism; c.1935-40)
- De Problemate Criteriologico (On Criteriological Problems; c.1935-40)
- Lectures on Bio-Physiological Science (1940)
- Notæ circa Libertatis Naturam (Notes about the Nature of Freedom; undated)
- De Natura Ideæ (On the Nature of Ideas; undated)
- De Cognitione Singularis Materialis (On the Perception of Individual Matter; undated)
- Ricetti (Recipes; undated)
- Modern and Classical Latin Grammar (c.1946-56)
- ‘The Melita English Grammar Book’ (c.1949/50)

=== Philosophical notes ===
The following list of notes are working annotations prepared by Pirotta for various publications, academic talks, or lectures, over an extended period of time. They are undated. Some of them had been grouped by Pirotta under the title ‘Studia Philosophica’ (Philosophical Studies).

- Notulæ in Tractationem “De Fide” (Annotations on [Aquinas'] Tract ‘On Faith’; undated)
- Notæ quæ “Naturam Divinam” respiciunt (Notes on the knowability of the ‘Divine Nature’; undated)
- Quæstiones Diversæ circa naturam metaphysicam Gratiæ et aliarum entium Ordinis Supernaturalis (Diverse enquiries about the metaphysical nature of Grace and other [enquiries] about the supernatural order of things; undated)
- De Dualismo Transcendentali in philosophia S. Thomæ (On Transcendental Dualism in the philosophy of St. Thomas [Aquinas];undated)
- De Interpretatione Opusculi S. Thomæ “De Ente et Essentia” (On the interpretation on St. Thomas [Aquinas’] tract ‘On Being and Essence’; undated)
- De Intuitione (On intuition; undated)
- De Abstractione (On abstraction; undated)
- De Cognitione Entis (On the understanding of being; undated)
- Quædam certa præsupponenda ad probl. criticum (Research concerning some beliefs about the criteriological problem; undated)
- De Veritate Formali (On formal truth; undated)
- Introductio ad Art. II de statibus mentis circa Veritatem (Introduction on Article II about the mental state in relation to truth; undated)
- De Positione Problematis Criticæ Fundamentalis (On the state of the enquiry concerning fundamental criteriology; undated)
- De Existentialismo (On existentialism; undated)
- Bellum ([On] war; undated)
- Introductio Philosophiæ Moralis seu Ethicæ (Introduction to moral philosophy or ethics; undated)
- Explicationes Diversarum Notionum Metaphysicarum (Various clarifications on the notion of metaphysics; undated)
- Quæstio “De Subiecto Metaphyicæ” (Enquiry on the subject of metaphysics; undated)
- Quæstiunculæ Philosophicæ (Minor philosophical enquiries; undated)
- De Obiecto seu Subiecto adæquato Metaphysicæ (On the acceptable object or subject of metaphysics; undated)
- Circa ipsius Esse naturam: Quæstiones Selectæ (About the same being of nature: Selected enquiries; undated)
- De Æternitate Mundi secundum opera S. Thomæ (On the world's eternity according to the teaching of St. Thomas [Aquinas]; undated)
- Logica Formalis (Formal Logic; undated)
- De Logica euisque divisione – De Semplice Apprehensione (On Logic and on its division – On Simple Apprehension; undated)
- De Definitione Philosophiæ eiusque Causis (On the Definition of Philosophy and of Causes; undated)
- De Divisione Philosophiæ (On the Division of Philosophy; undated)
- Schemata Logicæ (Schemes [concerning] Logic; undated)
- Logica materialis – Philosophia Naturalis (Material Logic – Natural Philosophy; undated)
- Schemata Philosophia Naturalis (Schemes for Natural Philosophy; undated)
- De Genetismo et distintione Viventium (On Genetics and the distinction of Life; undated)
- De Objecto Psychologiæ – De Existentia Animæ – De Essentia Vitæ (On the Object of Psychology – On the existence of the Soul – On the Essence of Life; undated)
- De Cognitione Animæ (On the Perception of the Soul; undated)
- Vita secundum Conceptum Philosophicum (Life according to the Philosophical Concept; undated)
- Storia di Filosofia dell’Epoca Pagana (History of Philosophy in the Pagan Era; undated)
- Schemata Kanti (Schemes [concerning] Kant; undated)
- De Obiecto Intellectus (On the Object of the Intellect; undated)
- De distinctione potentiarum ab essentia Animæ (On the distinction between potency and essence in the Soul; undated)
- (Schemata) De Infinito ([Schemes] On the Infinite; undated)
- (Schemata) De Moto et Locus et al. ([Schemes] On Motion and Space and others; undated)
- (Schemata) Difficultates contra Veracitatem Sensuum Externorum ([Schemes] [concerning] Difficulties against the Truth of Exterior Senses; undated)
- (Schemata) Genesis Psychologica actus intellectus ([Schemes] [concerning] The Psychological Origin of the intellectual act; undated)

=== Academic talks ===
The following written texts are full transcripts of talks read by Pirotta at academic institutes, in Malta and elsewhere in Italy, that he was part of. None of them have been published.

- Circulus Philosophicus – Realismus Aristotelico-Thomisticus (Philosophical Circle – Aristotelian-Thomistic Realism; probably at Viterbo, Italy; 1922)
- Circulus Philosophicus – Abiogenesis physice (Philosophical Circle – Aristotelian-Thomistic Realism; probably at Viterbo, Italy; 1922)
- De Anima Vegetativa (On Vegetative Life; undated)
- Oratio Inauguralis Anni Scholastici 1927-28 – “De Methodologia Scientifico-Theologica” (Inaugural Talk [for the] Scholastic Year 1927-28 – On the Scientific-Theological Method; Rabat, Malta; 1927)
- Discorso pronunziato nella accademia celebrata in onore del Dottor Aug. S. Tommaso d’Aq. (Talk read during the academic soirée kept in honour of the Eminent Doctor St. Thomas Aquinas; Rabat, Malta; 1929)
- Parole d’Introduzione fatte nell’Accademia festeggiata per la prima volta nel Collegio di Barra in onore di S. Tommaso (Introductory talk at the Academic Soirée kept for the first time at the college at Barra in honour of St. Thomas [Aquinas]; Barra (Naples), Italy; 1932)
- Introduzione inaugurale per l’anno scolastico 1936-1937 (Inaugural introduction for the scholastic year 1936–37; Rabat, Malta; 1936)
- Discorsetto inaugurale per la Festa Accademica di S. Tommaso d’Aquino (Inaugural talk for the Academic Feast of St. Thomas Aquinas; Rabat, Malta; 1936)
- Parole di Saluto per l’Accademia di S. Tommaso (Welcome talk at the Academic Soirée of St. Thomas [Aquinas]; Rabat, Malta; 1937)
- Parole Introduttive alla Festa Accadmica – “S. Tom. D’Aquino” (Introductory talk at the Academic Soirée – St. Thomas Aquinas; Rabat, Malta; 1938)

=== Sermons ===
The following texts are the extant sermons that Pirotta read during his pastoral work. All were probably delivered in Malta, including the Italian ones. The Italian orations would have been read to diocesan priests or members of religious orders, and the Maltese ones to the general public.

==== In Italian ====
Pirotta's extant sermons in Italian are collected at the Dominican archives at Rabat, Malta. Most of the titles are Pirotta's own.

- Domenica Ia d’Avvento – Conoscere Gesù Christo (1st Sunday of Advent – Knowing Jesus Christ; 1937)
- Domenica 2a d’Avvento – Amare Gesù Christo (2nd Sunday of Advent – Loving Jesus Christ; 1937)
- Domenica 3a d’Avvento – Seguire ed imitare Gesù Christo (3rd Sunday of Advent – Following and imitating Jesus Christ; 1937)
- Domenica 4a d’Avvento – Preparare a ricevere degnamente Gesù Christo (4th Sunday of Advent – Preparing to receive worthily Jesus Christ; 1937)
- Giorno Io, Predica Ia – Il valore dell’anima umana (1st Day, 1st Oration – The value of the human soul; undated)
- Giorno IIo, Predica IIa – Il peccato mortale (2nd Day, 2nd Oration – Mortal sin; undated)
- Giorno IIIa, Predica IIIa – L’iniettatore micidiale del male: Il mondo (3rd Day, 3rd Oration – The deadly originator of evil: The world; undated)
- Giorno IVo, Predica IVa – Il formaco del peccato: La confessione (4th Day, 4th Oration – The remedy of sin: Confession; undated)
- Giorno Vo, Predica Va – Pratica ed esercizio delle opere buone (5th Day, 5th Oration – The use and exercise of good works; undated)
- Giorno VIo, Predica VIa – I doveri professionali del proprio stato (6th Day, 6th Oration – The professional duties of one's state; undated)
- Giorno VIIo, Predia VIIa – L’apostolato laico (7th Day, 7th Oration – Lay apostolate; undated)
- Panegirico di San Tommaso (Laudatory discourse [in honour] of St. Thomas [Aquinas]; undated)
- Panegirico di San Publio Vescovo e Martire (Laudatory discourse [in honour] of St. Publius Bishop and Martyr; Floriana, Malta; 23 April 1939)
- Panegirico della Conversione di San Paolo Appostolo (Laudatory discourse [in honour] of St. Paul the Apostle; Mdina Cathedral, Malta; 25 January 1940)
- Predica di Maria SS. Desolata (Oration on the Blessed Mary of Sorrows; Valletta, Onorati; Good Friday, 15 April 1949)
- Discorso per l’Ultimo Giorno dell’Anno (Talk on New Year's Eve; 1938)
- Conferenze rinnovazione dell Profesione Religiosa (Talks [on the occasion of the] renewal of Religious Vows; undated)
- Panegirico del S. Patriarca Domenico (Laudatory discourse [in honour] of the Patriarch St. Dominic; Porto Salvo, Valletta, Malta; 4 August 1939)
- San Tommaso d’Aquino (St. Thomas Aquinas; La Quercia, Viterbo, Italy; 7 May 1924)
- Sermoni Suore Domenicane ([Seven] Sermons to Dominican Nuns; undated)

==== In Maltese ====
Pirotta's extant sermons in Maltese are collected in separate groups of manuscripts (as indicated). They are kept at the Dominican archives at Rabat, Malta. The titles are generally Pirotta's own.

- Relazioni fuk iz-Zwieg “Mixtæ Religionis” (Report on mixed marriages; 1913?) – Presented at the Eucharistic Congress of the diocese of Malta at Floriana and Sliema
- Panegirico di Maria Assunta in Cielo (Laudatory discourse [in honour] of the Assumption of [the Blessed] Mary in Heaven; undated)
- Panegierku ta San Filep d’Agira (Laudatory discourse [in honour] of St. Philip of Hegira; undated)
- Panegierku ta Maria Bambina (Laudatory discourse [in honour] of the Birth of [the Blessed] Mary; undated)
- Panegierku Madonna tad Duttrina (Laudatory discourse [in honour] of Our Lady of Good Teaching; undated)
- Panegierku tal Kalb Imkaddsa ta’ Gesù (Laudatory discourse [in honour] of the Blessed Heart of Jesus; undated)
- Panegirico del SS.mo Nome di Gesù – L’eccellenza e le virtù del SS. Nome (Laudatory discourse [in honour] of the Most Holy Name of Jesus – The distinction and virtues of the Most Holy Name [of Jesus]; undated)
- Discorsetto nel Io Mistero Doloroso (Short talk on the 1st Mystery of Sorrow [of the rosary]; undated)
- Discorso nel IIIo e IVo Mistero Doloroso (Talk on the 3rd and 4th Mysteries of Sorrow [of the rosary]; undated)
- Fervorini f’Jum il Milied (Talk for Christmas Day; 1946?)
- Fervorini maghmul fl’Ewwel Quddiesa tal Milied (Talk read at the First Mass of Christmas Day; 1946)
- Diskorso Antiblasfemo (Talk against blasphemy; undated)
- Diskorsetto Antiblasfemo (Short talk against blasphemy; undated)
- Vangelo – Domenica IV Post Oct. Paschæ (Gospel – 4th Sunday after Easter; 1938)
- Vangelo – VIII Domenica P. O. Pent. (Gospel – 8th Sunday after Pentecost; 1938?)
- Vangelo – IX Domenica dopo Oct. Pent. (Gospel – 9th Sunday after Pentecost; 1938?)
- Vangelo – Domenica XXI P. O. P. (Gospel – 21st Sunday after Pentecost 1938?)
- Fervorino Eucharistico in occasione della festa di San Luigi Gonzaga (Eucharistic talk on the occasion of the feast of St. Louis Gonzaga; undated)
- Siegha ta Adorazzjoni (One hour adoration; undated)
- Panigierku tal Madonna tar Ruzarju (Laudatory discourse [in honour] of Our Lady of the Rosary; undated)
- Panigierku ta San Duminku (Laudatory discourse [in honour] of St. Dominic; undated)
- Priedki fuq il Patrijarka San Duminku – San Domenico e il suo Ordine (Orations on the Patriarch St. Dominic – St. Dominic and his Order; undated)
- Diskors ghall Ewwel Quddiesa Solenni ta’ Sacerdot gdid (Talk for the First Solemn Mass of a new Priest; undated)
- Prietca ta tielet misteru Glorioso (Oration on the 3rd Glorious mystery [of the rosary]; 1916)
- Prietca 4o – 5o Glorioso (Oration [on the] 4th [and] 5th Glorious [mystery of the rosary]; 1916?)
- Ferrvorino Eucaristico (Eucharistic talk; undated)
- Irtir Spirituali: Primo Giorno – Eccellenza e prezzo dell’anima (Spiritual retreat: 1st Day – The distinction and worth of the soul; undated)
- Irtir Spirituali: Secondo Giorno – Dovere dell’anima verso Dio (Spiritual retreat: 2nd Day – The duties of the soul towards God; undated)
- Irtir Spirituali: Terzo Giorno – L’amore del prossimo (Spiritual retreat: 3rd Day – Love of neighbour; undated)
- Irtir Spirituali: Quarto Giorno (Spiritual retreat: 4th day; undated)
- Irtir Spirituali: Quinto Giorno (Spiritual retreat: 5th Day; undated)
- Irtir Spirituali: Sesto Giorno – Il sacrificio S. Messa (Spiritual retreat: 6th Day – The sacrifice of the Mass; undated)
- Irtir Spirituali: Ottavo ed Ultimo – La perseveranza Cristiana (Spiritual retreat: 8th and last – Christian perseverance; undated)
- Barka tas Salib fl ahhar tal Ezercizzi jew tal Irtir Spirituali (Blessing at the end of the [spiritual] Exercises or Spiritual Retreat; undated)
- Scheme di Conferenze Della Perfezione Religiosa o del Profitto Spirituale (Schemes for talks on the Fulfilment of Religious [life] or on Spiritual Rewards; undated)
- Skema ta Ezercizzi Spirituali (Scheme of Spiritual Exercises; undated)
- Diskors fuq is Sagrament tal Krar (Talk on the Sacrament of Confession; undated)
- Elogiu Funebri al meut tal Papa Piu XI (Talk for the memorial service of Pope Pius XI; 1939)

== See also ==
- Philosophy in Malta

== Sources ==
- Mark Montebello, Il-Ktieb tal-Filosofija f’Malta (A Source Book of Philosophy in Malta), PIN Publications, Malta, 2001.
- Mark Montebello, Angelo Pirotta: A Maltese philosopher of the first water, Maltese Dominican Province, Malta, 2006.
