= Mikael Stenmark =

Swedish philosopher

Mikael Stenmark (born 1962) is a Swedish philosopher who is Dean of the Faculty of Theology since 2008 and Professor of Philosophy of Religion at the Department of Theology, Uppsala University, Sweden. He has published papers in the philosophy of religion, the philosophy of science, and environmental ethics and on science-religion issues. Stenmark is the author of "Rationality in Science, Religion and Everyday Life" (1995), for which he was awarded The John Templeton Foundation Prize for Outstanding Books in Theology and the Natural Sciences in 1996.

== Selected bibliography ==
- Rationality in Science, Religion and Everyday Life: Four Models of Rationality (1995) ISBN 978-0-268-01651-7
- Scientism: Science, Ethics and Religion (2001) ISBN 978-0-7546-0446-4
- Environmental Ethics and Policy-Making (2002) ISBN 978-0-7546-0563-8
- How To Relate Science And Religion: A Multidimensional Model (2004) ISBN 978-0-8028-2823-1

== Lectures ==
- The Fallacy of Scientism as a Worldview - available at (Download MP3 Streaming Video Download Video)
- Models for Relating Science and Religion - available at (Download MP3 Streaming Video Download Video)
