= Peter Moore (travel author) =

Australian travel writer (born 1962)

- Moore enjoying a pint with his fans
- Born: 18 July 1962 (age 64); Sydney, Australia
- Occupation: Travel writer
- Children: 1
- Website: www.petermoore.net

Peter Moore (born 18 July 1962) is an Australian travel writer.

== Biography ==
Moore, who was born in Sydney, claims to have visited 105 countries. He currently lives with his wife and daughter in London. He has published many books that re-tell tales of his travels.

He is a Vespa enthusiast and his 2005 book Vroom with a View and 2007 book Vroom by the Sea feature trips through Italy taken on vintage Italian motorscooters.

== Bibliography ==
- No Shitting in the Toilet – The travel guide for when you've really lost it (1997)
- The Wrong Way Home – London to Sydney the hard way (1999)
- The Full Montezuma – Around Central America with the girl next door (2001)
- Swahili for the Broken-Hearted – Cape Town to Cairo by any means possible (2003)
- Vroom with a View – In search of Italy's Dolce Vita on a '61 Vespa (2005)
- Same Same, but Different (2006, eBook)
- Crikey! (unpublished)
- Vroom by the Sea – The sunny parts of Italy on a bright orange Vespa (Australia 2007, UK 2009)
