= Pete Moore (science writer) =

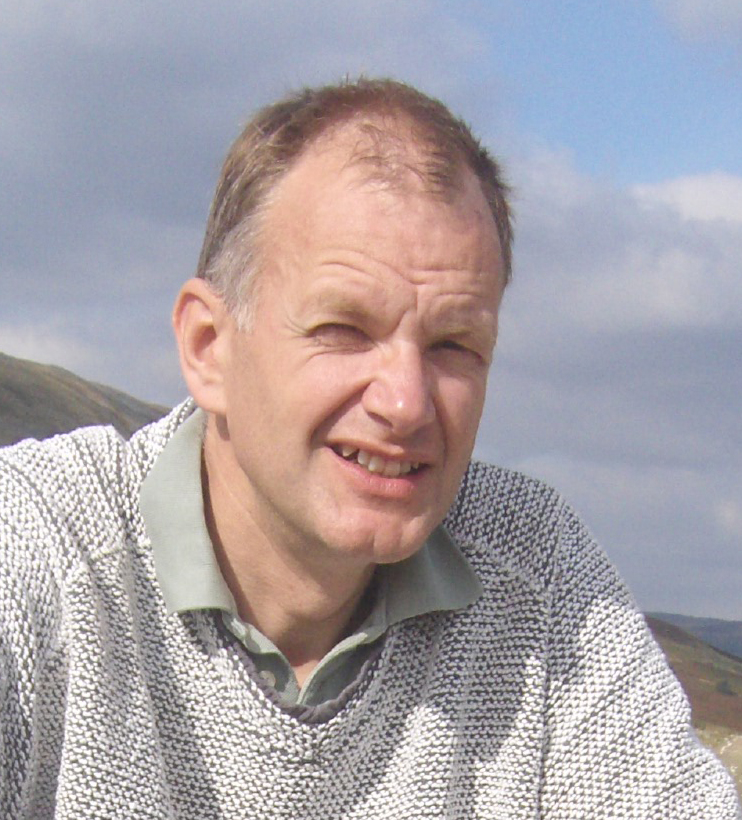
- Born: 1962 (age 63–64); Abingdon, Oxfordshire, England
- Occupations: Write, author, speaker, futurist and director of ThinkWrite
- Website: www.thinkwrite.biz

Pete Moore is a British science writer, author, speaker and facilitator. His work aims to convey scientific concepts in layman's terms to enable public debate. Many of his books look at aspects of what it is to be human, and how the technological implementation of scientific discoveries will affect us. His writings cover a wide range of areas including science, philosophy, theology and history, and much of his writing aims to show the history behind ideas as well as revealing their strengths and weaknesses. His business, ThinkWrite, provides a tested and structured method for writing complex or long documents clearly and successfully.

== Biography ==
Pete Moore was born in Abingdon, Oxfordshire and lived in Retford, Nottinghamshire and Buntingford, Hertfordshire, before studying the 'Physiology and Biochemistry of Farm Animals' at the University of Reading. He stayed at Reading to pursue a PhD in fetal physiology, with a research project that aimed to work out the neural mechanisms that cause mammals to breathe once they are born. His Post-doctorate phase involved work at the University of Auckland and University College London. Since 1990 he has written for many broadsheet papers and journals including Nature, New Scientist, The Lancet, BMJ, The Guardian, Journal of Biology and Zest. He has won or been shortlisted for national awards for his work including a shortlisting for his work on The Wonder Project. He has acted as a rapporteur at private meetings held at St George's House, Windsor Castle and at the House of Lords. Media appearances include interviews on BBC radio and TV as well as many other international radio stations. He is a visiting lecturer on the University of the West of England's Science Communication masters course. In 2000 he established ThinkWrite, a training organisation dedicated to helping people reduce the time they spend writing clear and successful documents by informing their approach to structure. These workshops were initially delivered to the academic sector, but by 2018 participants came from a wide range of backgrounds including business. By 2019 ThinkWrite had delivered over 2,000 workshops, and met more than 30,000 participants. He is a member of the Physiological Society, the Association of British Science Writers, and a past chair of the Medical Journalists' Association. He is Fellow of the Royal Society of Arts and the Faraday Institute.

== Reviews of Moore's writings ==
In its review of Blood and Justice, The Wellcome Trust said "I am left craving more medical and scientific history to be delivered in such a lively manner", but criticised Moore's "readiness to skip forward within his chapters, filling the readers with more up-to-date information of the subsequent findings about blood and transfusion", finding this "a bit disconcerting". PopularScience said of Being Me "Moore has managed to paint a superb picture of the human being, using a scientific perspective"

== Works ==
- (2001) Babel's Shadow: Genetic technology in a fracturing society, Lion Hudson ISBN 978-0745944241
- (2001) Superbugs: Rogue diseases of the twenty-first century, Carlton Publishing Group ISBN 978-1842221792
- (2002) E=mc2: The Great Ideas that shaped our world, ABC Books ISBN 978-1861553171
- (2002) Blood and Justice: The 17th Century Parisian Doctor Who Made Blood Transfusion History, John Wiley & Sons ISBN 978-0470848425
- (2003) Being Me: What it Means to be Human, John Wiley & Sons ISBN 978-0470850886
- (2004) The Forensics Handbook: The secrets of Crime Scene Investigation, Eye Books, ISBN 978-1903070352
- (2006) Science (Little Book of Big Ideas), Bloomsbury Publishing ISBN 978-0713674941
- (2008) The little book of Pandemics: 50 of the world’s most virulent plagues and infectious diseases Harper Perennial ISBN 978-0061374210
- (2008) Enhancing me The hope or hype of human enhancement (Science Museum TechKnow Series), John Wiley & Sons ISBN 978-0470724095
- (2010) Genetic Engineering (Ethical Debates), Wayland Books ISBN 978-0750261623
- (2011) Stem-cell Research (Ethical Debates), Wayland Books ISBN 978-0750265942
