= 1806 Birgu polverista explosion =

Munitions depot accident in British Malta

Birgu polverista explosion
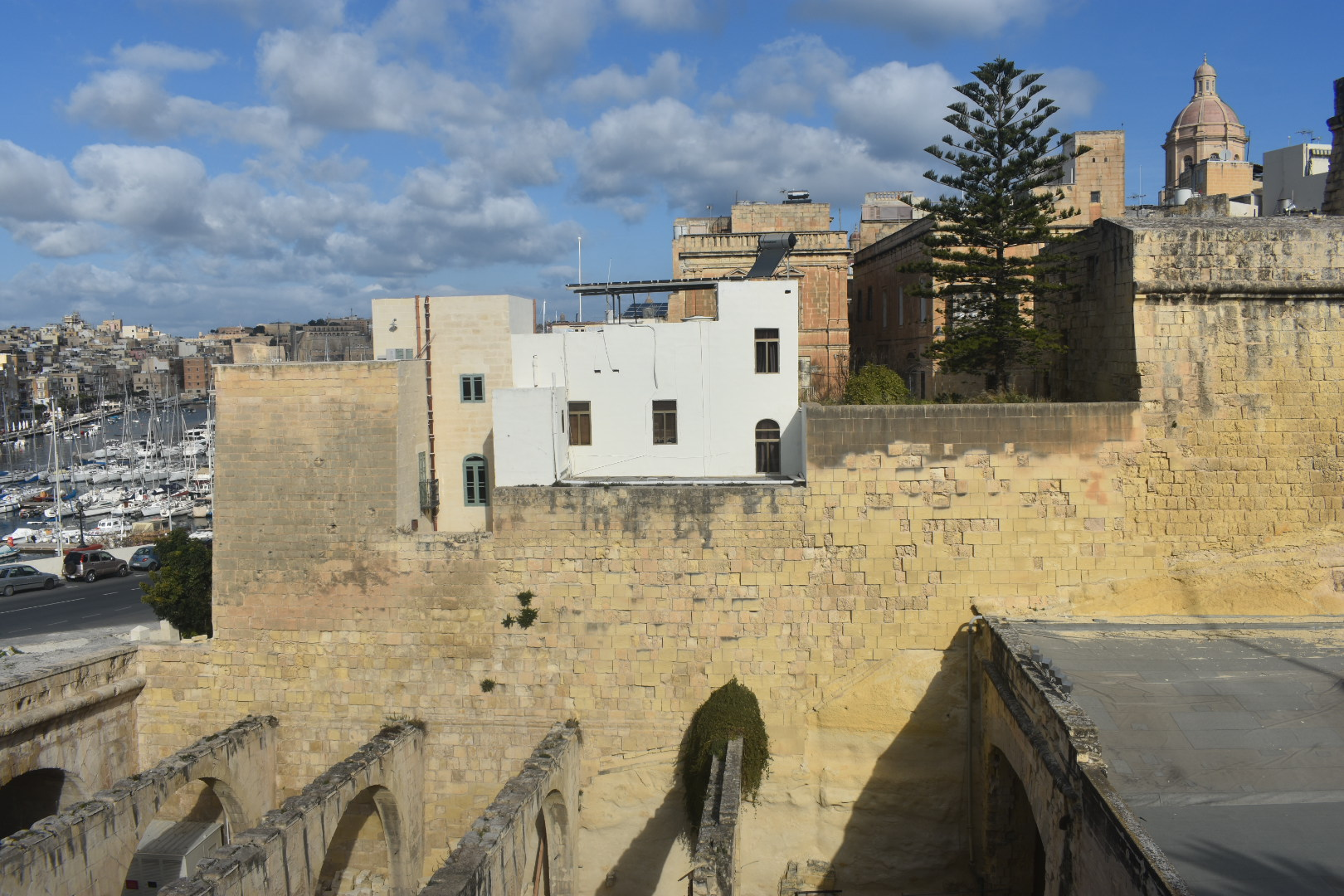
- The site of the magazine
- Date: 18 July 1806; 220 years ago
- Time: 06:15
- Location: Birgu, Malta Protectorate; 35°53′09″N 14°31′19″E
- Type: Gunpowder magazine explosion
- Cause: Negligence
- Deaths: c. 150–240
- Injuries: c. 100
- Property damage: £35,000 (c. 1806), £3,212,222.22 (incl. inflation up to 2020)

On 18 July 1806, approximately 40,000 lb (18,000 kg) of gunpowder stored in a magazine (polverista) in Birgu, Malta, mistakenly detonated. The explosion killed an estimated 200 people, including British and Maltese military personnel, and Maltese civilians from Birgu. Parts of the city's fortifications, some naval stores, and many houses were destroyed. The accident was found to be the result of negligence while transferring shells from the magazine.

== Background ==
In the 18th and early 19th centuries, the main gunpowder store in Birgu was located in a casemate within the city walls, close to the Porta Marina. This was an improvised measure; the casemate was not intended to be used as a gunpowder magazine, but such practice was common at the time. Gunpowder was also stored in casemates at other locations, such as Fort St. Angelo, Fort Ricasoli, and Mdina. The Birgu magazine was located close to civilian housing, and the residents had complained about the dangers before the explosion. Preparations had been made to find alternative sites but nothing had been done; the storerooms that were meant to store gunpowder were being used as barracks or military hospitals.

The 1806 explosion was not the first time that a gunpowder disaster occurred in Malta. On 12 September 1634, a gunpowder factory in Valletta blew up, killing 22 people and causing severe damage to the Church of the Jesuits and the nearby college. In 1662, gunpowder that was stored in an echaugette on one of Valletta's counterguards exploded after being hit by lightning, but there were no casualties.

== Explosion ==
In July 1806, British forces in Malta were preparing artillery shells for shipment to Sicily, as ammunition stocks there were depleted due to the siege of Gaeta by the French. On 18 July, a working party of 13 men commanded by garrison gunner Bombardier Anderson were preparing a consignment of shells from the Birgu magazine, which was filled at full capacity with 370 barrels containing 40,000 lb (18,000 kg) of gunpowder, as well as 1,600 shells and grenades. Anderson was using a metal chisel to remove the fuses from live shells, which was contrary to instructions, and this resulted in sparks which caused a massive explosion at 06:15.

Anderson and the working party were killed instantly, as were three British soldiers of the 39th (Dorsetshire) Regiment of Foot and 23 Maltese soldiers of the 2nd Provincial Battalion. Between 150 and 200 civilians from Birgu were also killed, and approximately 100 others were injured by falling debris. The explosion frightened the inhabitants of Birgu, and it was also heard in the nearby cities of Senglea and Cospicua, as well as in the surrounding villages.

The magazine was located within the city's fortifications, and a section of the walls "went up in the air" and left a large breach. The city gate at the Porta Marina, a small bastion, and part of a curtain wall were all destroyed and were never rebuilt. Parts of the Navy Store Houses were also damaged or destroyed during the explosion. Birgu's cityscape was also altered by the explosion, since a large number of houses were destroyed or damaged by the explosion itself and by the rocks which fell from the bastions. There were 493 reports of property losses as a result of the explosion.

== Aftermath ==
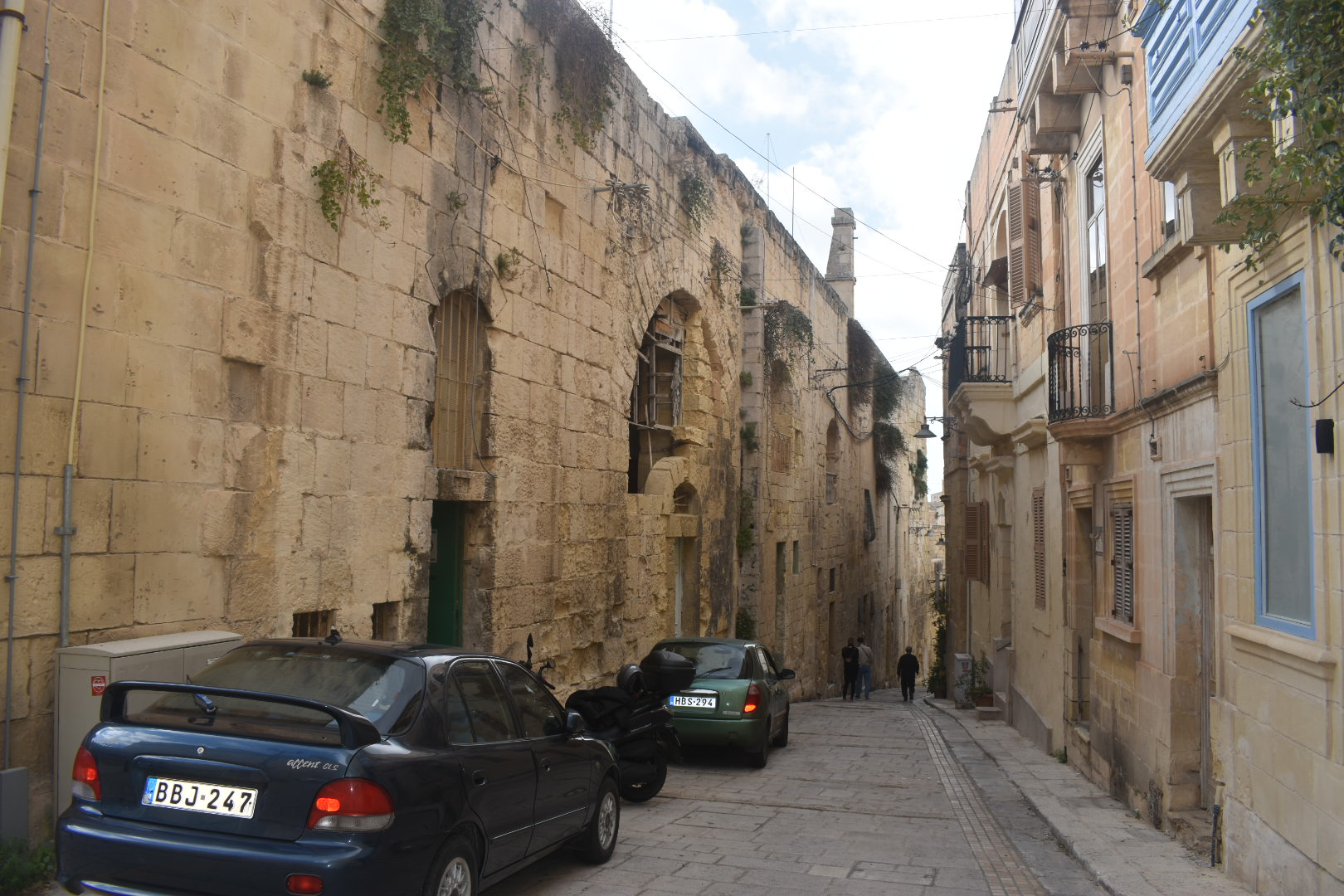
Triq il-Vittmi tal-Porvlista, with similar magazines built in the same period still intact or partially intact

Many Maltese people were angered at the loss of lives caused by negligence on behalf of the military. Civil Commissioner Alexander Ball reported that:

those Maltese who had already become disaffected with the Government, fanned the embers and fermented great agitation by magnifying the casualties and working upon the weakness and credibility of the lower ranks.

Victims and their families were paid partial compensation, and Ball set up a committee overseeing aid distribution. He also urged the government to pay full compensation. This was initially denied, but eventually the poorer classes received a compensation equivalent to two-thirds of their property which had been destroyed, while those of the upper classes received half of the value of their property. In 1811, £18,066.5s.10d (Note: Comparing 19th-century costs and prices with those of the modern period is challenging. £18,066.5s.10d in 1811 could be equivalent to between £1.2 million and £78.4 million in 2016, depending on the price comparison used.) was evenly distributed among those who had claimed damages. A wine merchant named Woodhouse lost a large amount of wine and the government provided him with extensive storehouses at the former Slaves' Prison in Valletta as a compensation. The initial total estimated damage for rebuilding was estimated at £35,000.

The affected area became known as l-Imġarraf (Maltese for "the destroyed"). A street close to where the explosion occurred is now known as Triq il-Vittmi tal-Porvlista (Maltese for "Polverista Victims Street"). The Vittoriosa Historical and Cultural Society installed a plaque at the St. Lawrence Cemetery on the 200th anniversary of the disaster in 2006, where most of the victims were buried.
