= Collegium Melitense =

Jesuit college in Hospitaller Malta

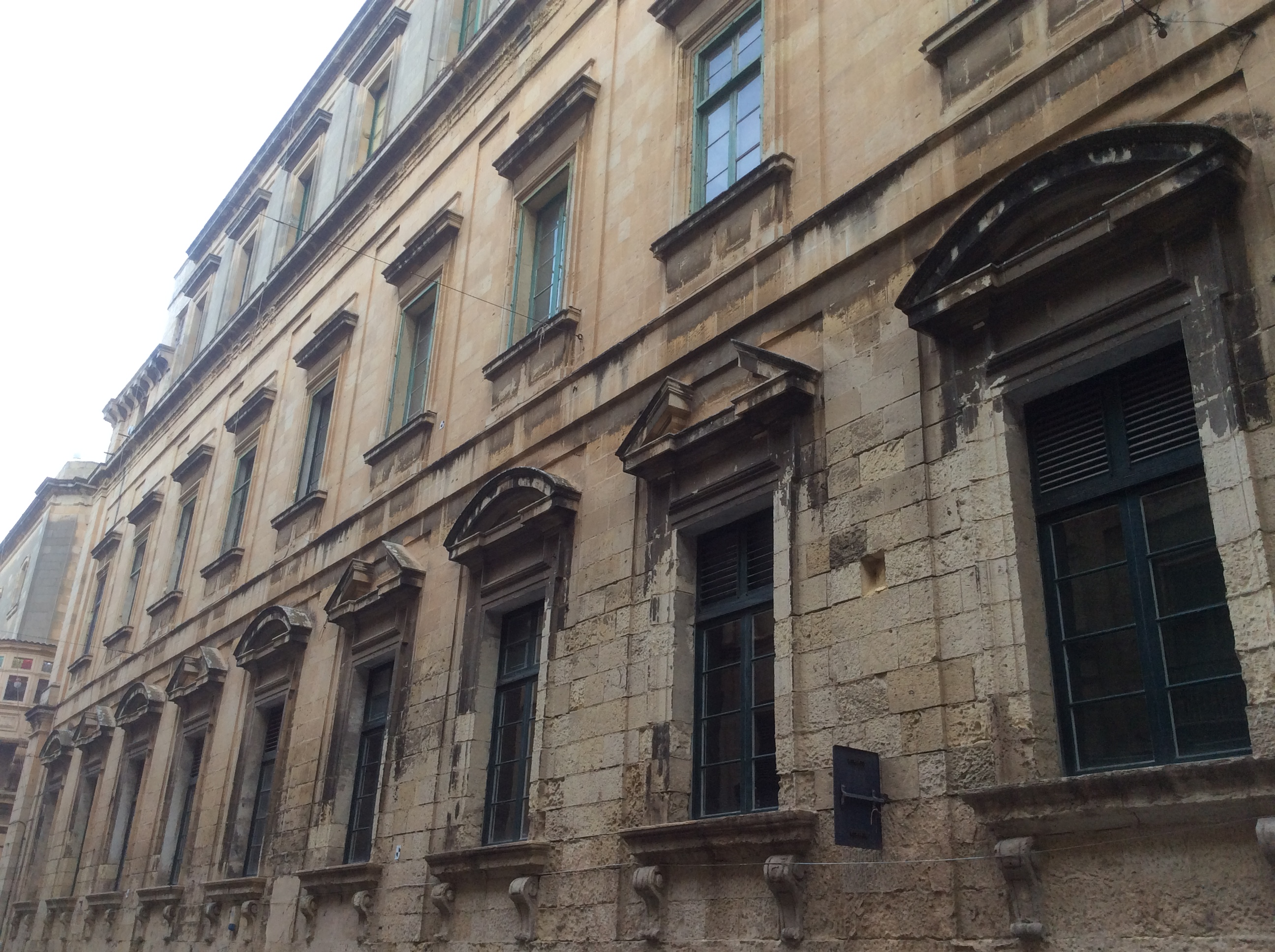
- Old University Building, Valletta
- Other name: Academia Parthenia
- Type: College (1592–1727); University (1727–1769)
- Active: 12 November 1592–22 November 1769
- Religious affiliation: Society of Jesus
- Students: 400+ (1706)
- Location: Valletta, Hospitaller Malta; 35°53′54″N 14°30′56″E
- Language: Latin

The Collegium Melitense was a Jesuit college in Valletta, Hospitaller Malta, which existed between 1592 and 1769. Lectures at the educational institution began in 1593, and it moved to a purpose-built building adjacent to a Jesuit church in 1597. The 17th century saw an expansion of its curriculum and an increase in the number of students in the college, and in 1727 it was recognised as a university and subsequently it also became known as the Academia Parthenia. After the Jesuits were suppressed from Malta, the college was reorganised into the Pubblica Università di Studi Generali, which was established on 22 November 1769. The latter is now known as the University of Malta.

== History ==
The Jesuit college and church as depicted on a map of Valletta, c. 1600

Plans to open a Jesuit college in Malta were made several times in the 16th century. In 1553, Bishop Domenico Cubelles sought the assistance of the Jesuits to open a college, but there was a shortage of manpower so the request was denied. By 1578, the Jesuits, the Inquisition and the Bishop were negotiating on whether or not to open a college, and in 1592 Pope Clement VIII intervened and ordered the establishment of the college. On 12 November 1592, the Collegium Melitense was formally established by a legal instrument entitled Instrumentum Fundationis Collegii, which was published by the notary Giacomo Sillato and witnessed by Grand Master Hugues Loubenx de Verdalle, Bishop Tomás Gargallo, Inquisitor Ludovico dell'Armi and the Jesuit priest Pietro Casati.

The college became operational in 1593, shortly after the end of a plague epidemic, with its staff initially consisting of 12 Jesuits. The establishment of the college was met with opposition from some local clergy, who made a petition to the Pope to set it up at Mdina instead of Valletta in 1593. Bishop Gargallo provided funds and temporary premises in Valletta for the new educational institution, while a permanent campus was constructed between 1595 and 1602.

On 7 June 1727, Grand Master António Manoel de Vilhena issued a bull which gave the Collegium the status of a university. Subsequently, the institution was sometimes referred to as the Academia Parthenia, possibly in reference to Parthenius of Nicaea.

In 1768, the Jesuits were expelled from Malta as part of a wider suppression of the religious order in Europe. Their property including the college were taken over by the Treasury of the Order of St John, and on 28 April 1768 Grand Master Manuel Pinto da Fonseca ordered the closure of the educational institution and most of its Jesuit staff were sent to Civitavecchia. Despite this, Pinto did not want to close the college and interim staff were appointed to resume lectures. On 29 August 1769, Pinto made a request to the papacy to establish a Pubblica Università di Studi Generali to replace the Collegium Melitense, and Pope Clement XIV authorised this through a papal brief entitled Sedula Romani Pontifici on 20 October 1769. Pinto signed a decree which established the new university on 22 November 1769, and this institution still exists today as the University of Malta.

== Campus ==
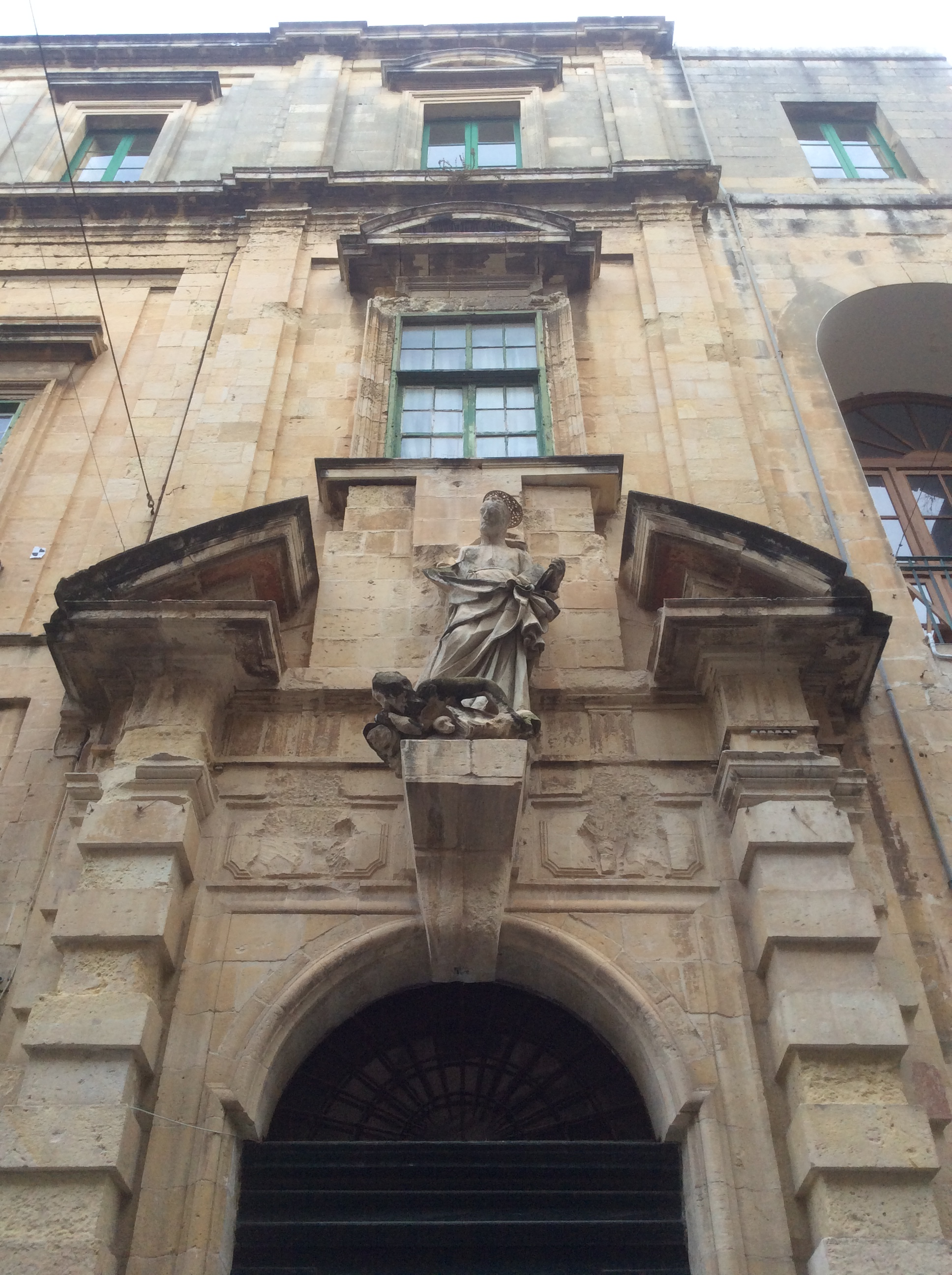
Entrance of the Old University Building with a statue of St Ignatius of Loyola and defaced coats of arms

For the first few years of its existence, the Collegium Melitense had no dedicated premises and classes were held at a house in Valletta which had been provided by Bishop Gargallo. Construction of a Jesuit church in Valletta had commenced in 1592, and construction of an adjacent building to house the college began in 1595. The college moved into the new building in 1597, although construction works continued until 1602. The college and the church were damaged in a gunpowder factory explosion in 1634, and both buildings were subsequently remodelled. They also suffered some damage in an earthquake in 1693 but they were also repaired.

After 1769, the premises continued to house the University of Malta and some alterations were made to the building in the 19th century. The former college was the university's main campus until the 1960s, when it moved to a much larger site at Msida. Now known as the Old University Building, the college building is now the university's Valletta campus and it is used for various conferences and seminars.

== Organisation and administration ==
The college was headed by a Rector.

== Academic profile ==
Initially, the Collegium Melitense only taught grammar and humanities (Literae humaniores), and one of its aims was to educate the clergy in the absence of a seminary. In the 17th century, its curriculum was expanded to other fields of study. Theology and logic were being taught at the college by 1615 and 1622 respectively. In 1655 a Chair of Mathematics was established by Grand Master Giovanni Paolo Lascaris, but the class stopped soon after his death in 1657 and it was not re-established until 1682. Philosophy and Scholastic Theology were being taught regularly by the end of the 17th century.

After the college was granted the status of a university in 1727, it began to grant degrees of Master and Doctor of Philosophy and Theology to students. Students of the institution presented public demonstrations of their academic capabilities known as Accademie at the end of each scholastic year. A pre-grade class for the youngest students, which was referred to as La Terza (Classe), was established on 19 October 1741.

== Student life ==
The number of students at the college increased during the course of the 17th century. It is recorded that there were 34 students in the logic class in 1622, and by 1630–31 the college had over 100 students. In 1658, the humanities class had 97 students. By 1706, there were over 400 students studying at the college.

In the 17th century, there were strict rules on how students were to behave themselves within the college. They had to wear simple clothing, and could only speak in Latin, with the exception of Thursdays and Sundays when they were allowed to speak Italian and Maltese. Apart from lectures, daily routines included choir practice and prayers several times a day.

== Notable people ==
=== Faculty ===
- Natale Masuccio
- George Sagnani

=== Alumni ===
- Giovanni Francesco Abela (possibly)
- Joseph Demarco (possibly)

== Commemorations ==
The Collegium Melitense's 400th anniversary in 1992 was commemorated with publications, the issue of commemorative stamps and coins and a Quatercentenary Exhibition.

== See also ==
- List of Jesuit sites
