= Joseph Demarco =

Scientist and philosopher (1718–1793)

- Born: 2 January 1718; Cospicua, Malta
- Died: 13 August 1793 (aged 75); Cospicua, Malta
- Occupations: Medicine, Philosophy

Joseph Demarco (1718–1793) was a Maltese medical practitioner, a scientist, and a major philosopher. His areas of specialisation in philosophy were mostly philosophical psychology and physiology.

Demarco's extensive interests make him unique. His main concern was human health and he was fascinated by the mechanisms of the human body and its infirmities, especially within their psychological and social contexts. This brought him to be attracted to the philosophical underpinnings of the human condition in all of its aspects.

== Life ==
=== Beginnings ===
Demarco was born on 2 January 1718 in Cospicua, Malta. This seaport and dry-dock hub was also a place where many different peoples congregated. More so since the then Grand Master of the Knights Hospitallers, António Manoel de Vilhena, had given free entry to the harbours to all nations.

Fortunate enough to be born within a well-off family, Demarco was given a good education (including a solid knowledge of Latin), probably at the Collegium Melitense of the Jesuits in Valletta, Malta. From an early age, his eyes were set on the medical profession, one highly regarded and very much encouraged by the Knights Hospitallers. Already as a young boy, his medical intellectual curiosity drew him to speculate about the effect of atmospheric conditions on the human body, as his writing from 1733 (De Aere), at only fifteen years of age, attests. Of course, he was also very much interested in understanding physical illnesses, as his writing from 1741 (De Tumoribus Humoralibus), on swellings caused by liquid retention, shows. In addition, he was from an early age piqued by instances of pathological madness, common to congested urban areas as his home-town, Cospicua, was, and made some particular observations about the phenomenon (especially that caused by rabies) around 1742 (Tractatus de Rabie).

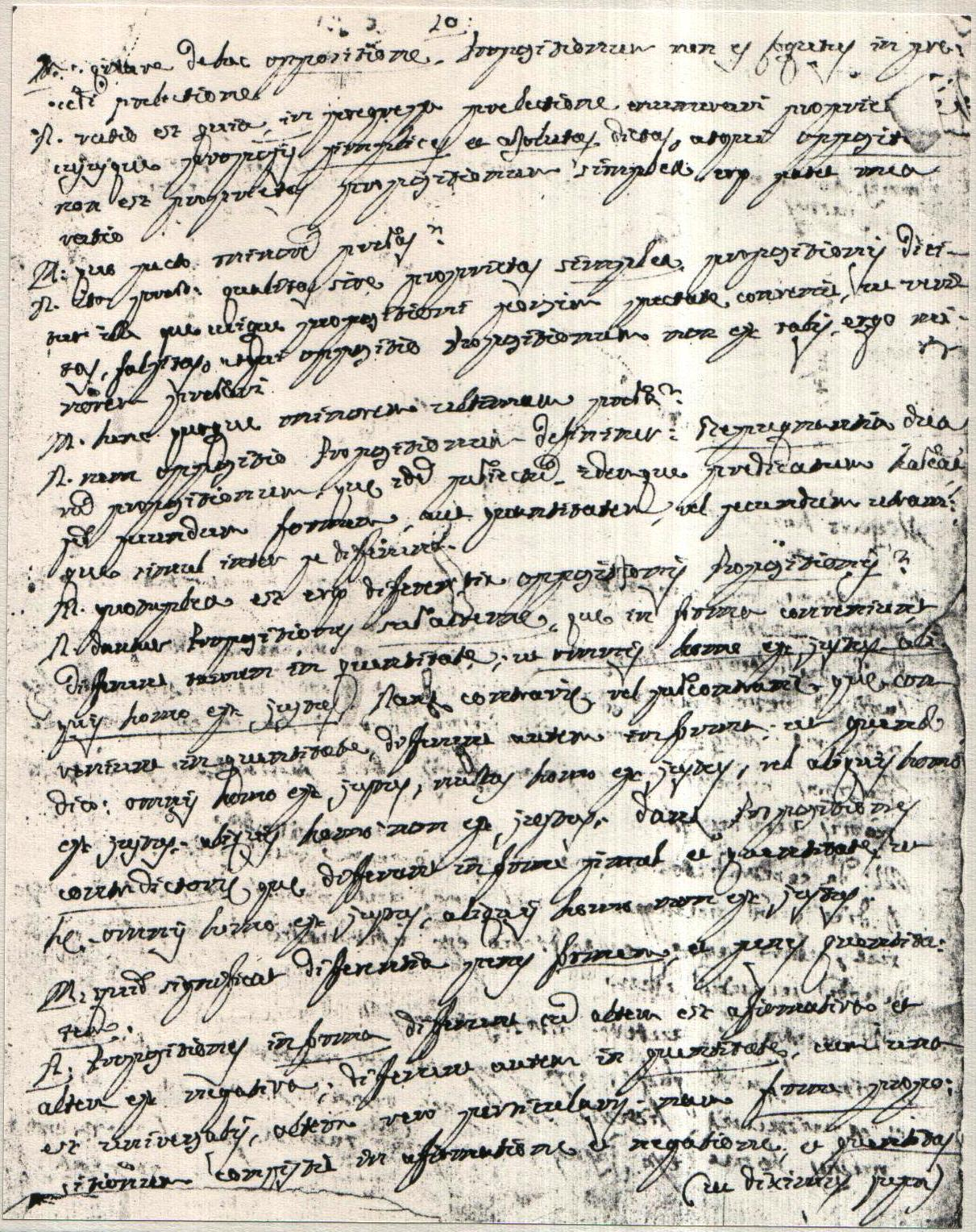
A page from one of Demarco's manuscripts

However, during this formative time Demarco also entertained interests in other scientific areas. Still in his early twenties, around 1742 he engaged himself in speculations on standard trigonometry (Trattato della Trigonometria Piana) and elementary arithmetic (Vulgaris Arithmeticæ Elementaris Theoria), giving them also some philosophical depth. During the same period, he wrote short studies on hydrostatics in general (Breve Compendio dell’Idrostatica) and on hydrostatic sources and technology (Trattato de Fonti e Machine Adrostiche).

=== France interlude ===
At just 24 years of age, in 1742, Demarco went to France to pursue a medical degree. Naturally, this was made possible by his parents’ financial resources. He studied at the University of Montpellier Languedoc-Roussillon région of the south of France. In particular, he studied under the renowned physician and botanist, François Boissier de Sauvages de Lacroix. This is also attested by a document written by Demarco, Physiologie Cursus: Anatomico – meccanico – experimentalis (A Course in Physiology: Anatomical – mechanical – experimental; 1765) which originates from De Sauvages’ course on the subject.

Demarco's writings during this period bear out to his professional and proficient stance in medical matters. In particular, one may note his investigations dealing with chest (Tractatus De Morbis Pectoris) and abdominal ailments (De Morbis Abdominis). In all probability, it was this dexterity and expertise which convinced his lecturers to trust him, from amongst his peers, with a course on physics (as his Traité de Physique attests). This must have been highly prestigious for the young freshman.

Having completed his two-year course in medicine, Demarco defended his thesis in 1743. It was entitled Dissertatio Physiologica de Respiratione, ejusque Uso Primario (Physiological Aspects of Respiration and its Primary Significance). The work was published a year later, in 1744, at Montpellier.

=== Malta period ===
Demarco returned to Malta as Doctor of Medicine, but also with a keen eye on social affairs. It seems that his acquaintance with Enlightenment philosophy while in France enhanced his sensitivity towards communal needs and societal acclimatisation. Nevertheless, throughout his long career he never directly involved himself in any political activity, not even when the French Revolution erupted on the European scene.

His commitment was of a purely medical nature. And if every now and then he reached out into philosophical spheres, he always did this in strict relationship to his medical speculations. Demarco, in fact, did not seem sympathetic towards any revolutionary beliefs or objectives. On the contrary, he was a close collaborator and a personal friend of the Grand Master of the Knights Hospitallers, Manuel Pinto da Fonseca, who immediately, on Demarco's return to Malta, chose him as Principle Medical Officer for the Maltese Islands. His loyalty to the Knights Hospitallers went unblemished throughout his entire life.

=== Professional career ===
Demarco's main professional asset was his sharp eye for observation. This is amply attested by the thirty-four works we have from his forty-two-year career in Malta after his return from Paris. All of his speculative reflections, including his philosophical ones, squarely rest on the authority of concrete experience and on pure sense data.

Though highly proficient from a professional point of view, Demarco was consistently appealed by the theoretical foundations of the medical art and by the intellectual and academic relationships which particular illnesses suggested. As seen from his various works, he inquired into philosophy in general, social philosophy, physics, pathology (as he had in his youth), mechanical physics, experimental philosophy, philosophical physiology, science in general, and various other fields of an academic and rational nature.

In 1788, when Demarco was 70 years of age (and already in poor health himself), the Grand Master of the Knights Hospitallers, Emmanuel de Rohan-Polduc, requested that he went to Tripoli, then an Ottoman province, to see to the health of the pasha there, who was gravely ill. This incident demonstrates the high esteem in which Demarco was held. Not only was the matter complicated from medical point of view, but also politically sensitive (having a Christian medic treated a Muslim leader). Fortunately, the mission was a success, and Demarco's standing was never as strong. While in Tripoli he continued to indulge his scientific and philosophical curiosity by making copiousness notes about the quality of the soil, the atmosphere, and also about local customs. He even took down observations about various illnesses and diseases, particularly (as was his passion) on the types of pathological madness he encountered there.

=== Death ===
On his return to Malta, Demarco showed serious signs of physical decline. The Order of Knights Hospitallers which he loved was fatally in trouble, not only because of the revolution in France, but also for its internal bankruptcy, corruption, and loose morals. It seemed that Demarco was passing away together with a whole age.

He died at Cospicua, his home-town, on 13 August 1793, and was buried at the parish church at Cospicua.

== Published works ==
Demarco's published works are just a handful. They are the following. While the latter three are of some interest to philosophy, the first is of a medical interest only.

- Dissertatio Physiologica de Respiratione, ejusque Uso Primario (Physiological Aspects of Respiration and its Primary Significance; written in 1743, and published in 1744). – The publication contains six chapters respectively dealing with the following: the organs of breathing and their strength; the nature and peculiarities of respiratory air; the function of breathing; the instruments of expiration, their powers, functions, and the reciprocation of this action; the phenomena of respiration; and the primary use of respiration. The work, which is made up of some 100 pages, and written in Latin, has little philosophical value. It was published by A. Rochard in Montpellier.
- Tractatus Mechanicus de Non Naturalibus (A Study on Artificial Mechanics; 1748) – This book in Latin was published in Avignon, France, by Francis Girard (Palateâ Sancti Desiderii). It bears the long subtitle: Qui est brevis explicatio mutationum, quas in humano corpore producuut Aer, Diaeta, etc. simul cum inquisitione in naturam et usum balneorum. Quibus præfixa est Doctrina Secretionis, pluribus in propositionibus (Which contains brief explanations on certain changes which occur in the human body because of man's environment and his ways of living, and so forth, the same as happens because of living in a natural environment u the use of baths. In which is added some teaching about the distinctions between animals, and also some distinctions).

The publication, which contains 402 pages, is beautifully presented with gilded edges. The material presented is extremely interesting and very detailed, and particularly relevant to philosophy. Basically it deals with the physical functions of human beings, particularly seen under the aspect of the natural environment. Demarco’s basic philosophy throughout the book is that, the more human beings are removed from nature and from natural living, the more they are susceptible to illnesses and, consequently, the more they move towards nature and live in harmony with it, the healthier they will be.

The book is divided in nine chapters. It opens with a preface, a warning to the reader, and a list of 22 proposition concerning the differences between animals. This part is based on the teachings of Aristotle. At the end, Demarco includes a separate study called Tractatus de Hepate (A Treatise concerning Hipatitis).

The nine chapters might be considered under two aspects. While the first five focus on the unnatural causes of physical malfunctions in humans, the last four concentrate on the effects that the environment and natural living have on the human body. The first five chapters respectively deal with the effects which an artificial environment have on the heart, on respiration, on the body, on the brain, and on body temperature. The successive four chapters respectively deal with the beneficial effects on the body which ensue from the natural environment, therapeutic baths, food, and drink.

- De Lana (Concerning Wool; 1759) – This 367-page book was published in Malta at the printing press of the Knights Hospitallers in Valletta. It mainly deals with the proper application of wool in well-being and sickness. This indicates that's Demarco's intent here was not merely technical. Indeed, the work is not exactly philosophical. Nonetheless, Demarco explores the connection between the industrial production of wool fabric and human living, and the relationship between the growth of wool and mechanics. The work bears the official approbation of Henry Ercole, amongst others, on behalf of the competent authorities. At the end of the book, Demarco also includes a separate study, which is the following:
- De Chocholata (Concerning Chocolate; 1760) – The work is made up of three chapters over 28 pages, and carries the subtitle: * Dissertatio de Chocholata ejusque usu e abusu in medicina ubi inquiritur etiam: an potione cocholate jejunium ecclesiasticum frangatur (A dissertation on the use and abuse of chocolate in medical matters, and whether chocolate breaks ecclesiastical fasts). Despite the title of this work, which might be seen as frivolous, the study is a very interesting one, both from an historical and cultural point of view as well as from a moral approach. In Demarco's time, chocolate was a liquid product imported from beyond European shores, and whose precise nature was not yet known. The moral problems apparently created by chocolate consumption must have been very relevant at the time. In fact, the censors’ comments on the subject (including Henry Ercole are given importance by being placed on separate pages for clarity's sake. In his study, Demarco focuses on the medicinal usefulness of chocolate (its addictive substance, for instance), and on its moral aspect (whether it is a kind of sweet or simply a vegetation).

== Extant manuscripts with philosophical interest ==
All of Demarco's manuscripts are held at the National Library of Malta in Valletta, and still in their manuscript form. Though some interest in the man's activities and intellectual endeavours had always been kept alive amongst academics, little serious effort had ever been made to bring his scientific and philosophical accomplishments fully out in the open. The ones commented upon here are solely those which retain some philosophical interest. Of course, from a medical point of view all of his works would be relevant and worthy of thorough comprehension.

All manuscripts are written in Demarco's typical minuscule, crammed and barely legible handwriting, which of course makes reading, transliteration, translation and study immensely difficult. This is one of the most pertinent reasons, amongst others, for which Demarco's intellectual enterprise remains unexplored completely unto this day.

=== Philosophy ===
- De Logica (Concerning Logic; c. 1760) – A work in Latin (with unnumbered pages) which bears the subtitle Prælectiones Nonnullæ (A Few Instructions). It seems to have been intended as an introduction to logic for beginners.
- Atrium in Universam Physicam Experimentalem (An Introduction to Universal Experimental Physics; 1760) – This extant manuscript in Latin is incomplete and was left in draft form by Demarco himself. It is a commentary on the first book of Aristotle’s De Naturalibus (On Natural Things) or, in other words, on his De Sensu et Sensato (On Sense and Sensibility) of his Parva Naturalia (Brief Comments on Natural Things). What brought Demarco to commence this commentary was a new publication issued at Avignon, France, of Aristotle’s work.
- Varia (Miscellaneous; c. 1760) – Two Latin manuscripts which are together composed of 550 folios. They contain a colossal number of reflections in no order whatsoever. Herein Demarco simply jotted down any thought and musing as they came to mind. Very often is quite difficult to distinguish one from the other. At the end of the work, Demarco was considerate enough to include an index of contents. Obviously this was for his own use, as it is absolutely impossible to follow.
- Generalis Philosophiæ Atrium (A General Introduction to Philosophy; 1763) – The main idea of this manuscript in Latin is to provide a general introduction to what Demarco calls philosophiæ experimentalis (experimental philosophy) and all its divisions. The work has 43 chapters organised under 13 titles. The extant manuscript also includes marginal notes added by Demarco himself. The content deals with philosophy by respectively focusing on its qualifications; its structure; its objectives; its initial history; its history after classical times; its development; its academic divisions; the growth of its schools of thought; its main themes; its results; important Presocratic themes, and their meaning. The last title is reserved for some general comments concerning philosophy.

=== Social philosophy ===
- Epistola Dedicatoria (A Memorial Missive; 1754) – Text of an open letter in Latin supposedly sent from Senglea, Malta, on 12 January 1754, to Don Josepho de Dueñas, one of the Knights Hospitallers in Malta. The 15-folio long letter is certainly of a historical and literary value. However, also is interesting for the fact that it reveals some of Demarco's philosophical aptitudes.
- Delle Torture (Concerning Torture; c. 1750) – This manuscript in Italian had been left unfinished by Demarco himself. It is a very interesting study on the use of torture (common still in Demarco's day) from different angles. Nonetheless, Demarco stops short of expressing any moral pronouncement on the subject.
- Mannarino (Mannarino; 1773) – This is another open letter dedicated to a personality in Maltese history, Don Gaetano Mannarino. This priest was actually a contemporary of Demarco. From February 1773, he organised a group of fellow priests who, eventually, took up arms against Francisco Ximénez de Tejada, the Grand Master of the Knights Hospitallers, in protest for retracting some of their rights and privileges. The actual revolt of the priests took place on 9 September 1775. Nonetheless, Demarco's letter was written on October 22, of two years earlier. It still addresses some of the presumed issued which were being brought forward by the priests. Typically (and revealingly), in his missive Demarco sides with the Grand Master's point of view, and admonishes Mannarino and his collaborators for being so unreasonable and unruly.

=== Pathology ===
- Fasti: Morborum Melitensis (A Record: Maltese Infirmities; 1763–87) – An interesting document in which Demarco progressively recorded his thoughts and reflections. The manuscript, which is composed of 296 folios, is reserved for observations concerning infirmities of the body and also of the soul. Some entries are of philosophical interest. The document opens with a Latin preface, and closes with a Latin epilogue and, finally, 50 aphorisms.
- Physiologie Cursus: Anatomico – meccanico – experimentalis (A Course in Physiology: Anatomical – mechanical – experimental; 1765) – A study in Latin which deals with various aspects of physiology. Though the mechanistic concept of the body and of creation is accepted as basic, Demarco produces some objections and discussions for the acknowledgement of its absolute validity.
- Patologicus Brevis Cursus (A Short Course in Pathology; 1774) – A work in Latin which goes into the nature of mental illnesses. The content is divided in 222 parts.

=== Philosophical physiology ===
- Tractatus de Rabie (A Treatise concerning Rabies; c. 1742) – This Latin composition is made up of only 23 folios. The content, which does not include any internal divisions, was the work of a young Demarco probably before studying in France. It largely focuses on the nature of anger, especially from a physiological point of view. Nevertheless, Demarco also sees it fit to touch upon some philosophical themes here and then.
- Tractatus de Affectione (A Treatise on the Passions; 1764) – The main theme of this manuscript in Latin is the passions which overcome humans when their freedom of will becomes wanting. The work, which is made up of 76 folios, is divided in subtitles. At the end it includes an index of contents.

=== Science ===
- Trattato della Trigonometria Piana (A Treatise concerning Standard Trigonometry; 1742) – The work bears the subtitle: Con un breve saggio della Geometria Practica (With a brief study concerning Practical Geometry). The manuscript is made up of 212 folios, and written in Italian. The content is divided in Explications, Definitions (meaning concepts), and Propositions (including examples). The work is basically about flat triangles as distinguishable from spherical triangles.
- Vulgaris Arithmeticæ Elementaris Theoria (A Common Theory of Elementary Arithmetic; c. 1742) – This manuscript in Latin is made up of 58 folios, and divided into subtitles. Demarco focuses respectively on algebra, numerics, addition, and other arithmetic functions. An effort seems to have been made to make such an abstract subject understandable by non-professionals.
- Traité de Physique (A Treatise concerning the Human Body; 1745) – Notes in French of a course given by Demarco at the University of Montpellier while terminating his studies there. The content is divided in Subtitles and Sections. Of course, it deals with various aspects of the physical constitution of human beings.

== Other dated manuscripts ==
The following manuscripts are not considered to have any philosophical purport. Of course, they might have significant medical relevance. Nevertheless, as such they do not concern the main interest of this page. They are thus remained without comment or analysis.

=== Medical ===
- De Tumoribus Humoralibus (Concerning the Swelling by Liquid Retention; 1741)
- Tractatus De Morbis Pectoris (A Treatise concerning Chest Ailments; 1745)
- De Morbis Abdominis (Concerning Abdominal Ailments; 1745)
- De Voce Sana et Morbosa (Concerning Healthy and Sick Voices; 1747)
- Tractatus in moltiplicis Vene Sectionis (A Treatise on the various Vein Surgeries; 1747)
- Del Fegato e De Polmone (Concerning Asthma and Concerning the Lungs; 1747)
- Commentarius in Sylvam (A Commentary on Sylva; 1748–60)
- De Restenosis (Concerning Restenosis; 1755)
- De Febribus Acutis (Concerning High Fevers; 1756)
- Tractatus de Multiplicis Venæ Sectionis (A Treatise on the various Vein Surgeries; 1756)
- De Hydrope (Concerning Hydrops fetalis; 1759)
- Dell’Osteologia (Concerning Osteology; 1764)
- De Angiologia (Concerning Angiology; 1764)
- De Secretione (Concerning Secretion; 1764)
- Observationes de Morbis Cognoscitivæ Curandisque (Observations on the Knowledge and Curing of Diseases; 1764)
- Historiæ Morborum (A History of Diseases; 1767)
- Nevrologiæ Compendium (A Compendium concerning Neurology; 1768)
- De Integumentis (Concerning Bodily Coverings; 1768)
- Tractatus de Voce Sana et Morbosa (A Treatise on Healthy and Sick Voices; 1776)
- Therapeutica Nosologia Cutanea (The Therapy of Skin Nosology; 1780)
- De Myologia (Concerning Myology; 1781)
- Tractatus Nosologia Vocalis (A Treatise on Voice Nosology; 1781)
- Materies Medica (Medical Matters; 1789)

=== Physics ===
- De Aere (Concerning the Atmosphere; 1733)
- Breve Compendio dell’Idrostatica (A Short Treatise concerning Hydrostatics; 1742)
- Trattato de Fonti e Machine Adrostiche (A Treatise concerning the Hydrostatic Sources and Technology; c. 1742)

== Other undated manuscripts ==
As those immediately above, these manuscripts do not command any direct philosophical interest. Despite their medical relevance, they are left without comment here since they do not concern the objective of this page.

=== Medical ===
- Dissertatio Academico De Febre (An Academic Dissertation concerning Fever)
- Materia Medica (Medical Matters)
- De Fria Rerrevea et Acrimonatis (Concerning Acute and Discordant Colds)
- De Balvicis (Concerning Therapeutic Baths)
- Riflessioni sopra la relazione del Ritrovamento Dell’uova di chiocciola di A.F.M. (Reflections on the essay ‘The Discovery of the Chocolate Bean’ by A.F.M.)
- Critica contra Novum ductum Medullæ Spinalis (A Criticism against the so-called Newly discovered Duct of Spinal Bone Marrow)
- Adnotamenta in Boerhaave (Notes concerning Boerhaave)
- Actuaria pro animadversionibus in auctoritatem Auglum et Sylva (Short Notes in Defence of the Notes concerning Angel and Sylva)
- Prælectiones Medicæ (Lectures concerning Medicine)

=== Religious ===
- Esercizi di Pietà per tutti i giorni dell’anno (Holy Exercises for All the Days of the Year)

== Appreciation ==
Joseph Demarco has rarely been considered holistically. Medical academics have concentrated on some of his works which deal with health issues, philosophers have focused on works which have philosophical significance, and classicists have directed their attention to one or two of his works which offer interesting Latin features. Notwithstanding, no comprehensive and wide-ranging study of the man, his times and his accomplishments has ever been made. This is direly wanting.

As seen above, the larger part of Demarco's works are still in manuscript form, and this makes them impossible to be studied. Though the outlines of some of his work are generally identified and acknowledged, the greater number of his compositions remain unfamiliar and shrouded in obscurity.

With regard to philosophy in particular, a systematic and critical study of Demarco is still to be done. In general, it cannot be said that his philosophy is known at all, not even in general. This must necessarily entail arduous of transliteration and translation which might well be daunting. Nevertheless, it seems that Demarco certainly merits such attention and consideration.

== Dated works in chronological order ==
1. 1933 – De Aere (Concerning the Atmosphere)
2. 1741 – De Tumoribus Humoralibus (Concerning the Swelling by Liquid Retention)
3. 1742 – Trattato della Trigonometria Piana (A Treatise concerning Standard Trigonometry)
4. 1742 – Breve Compendio dell’Idrostatica (A Short Treatise concerning Hydrostatics)
5. c. 1742 – Tractatus de Rabie (A Treatise concerning Rabies)
6. c. 1742 – Vulgaris Arithmeticæ Elementaris Theoria (A Common Theory of Elementary Arithmetic)
7. c. 1742 – Trattato de Fonti e Machine Adrostiche (A Treatise concerning the Hydrostatic Sources and Technology)
8. 1743 – Dissertatio Physiologica de Respiratione, ejusque Uso Primario (Physiological Aspects of Respiration and its Primary Significance; published in 1744)
9. 1745 – Tractatus De Morbis Pectoris (A Treatise concerning Chest Ailments)
10. 1745 – De Morbis Abdominis (Concerning Abdominal Ailments)
11. 1745 – Traité de Physique (Treatise concerning Physics)
12. 1747 – De Voce Sana et Morbosa (Concerning Healthy and Sick Voices)
13. 1747 – Tractatus in moltiplicis Vene Sectionis (A Treatise on the various Vein Surgeries)
14. 1747 – Del Fegato e De Polmone (Concerning Asthma and Concerning the Lungs)
15. 1748 – Tractatus Mechanicus de Non Naturalibus (A Study on Artificial Mechanics)
16. 1748–60 – Commentarius in Sylvam (A Commentary on Sylva)
17. c. 1750 – Delle Torture (Concerning Torture)
18. 1754 – Epistola Dedicatoria (A Memorial Missive)
19. 1755 – De Restenosis (Concerning Restenosis)
20. 1756 – De Febribus Acutis (Concerning High Fevers)
21. 1756 – Tractatus de Multiplicis Venæ Sectionis (A Treatise on the various Vein Surgeries)
22. 1759 – De Hydrope (Concerning Hydrops fetalis)
23. 1759 – De Lana (Concerning Wool)
24. c. 1760 – De Logica (Concerning Logic)
25. c. 1760 – Varia (Miscellaneous)
26. 1760 – Atrium in Universam Physicam Experimentalem (An Introduction to Universal Experimental Physics)
27. 1760 – De Chocholata (Concerning Chocolate)
28. 1763 – Generalis Philosophiæ Atrium (A General Introduction to Philosophy)
29. 1763–87 – Fasti: Morborum Melitensis (A Record: Maltese Infirmities)
30. 1764 – Dell’Osteologia (Concerning Osteology)
31. 1764 – De Angiologia (Concerning Angiology)
32. 1764 – De Secretione (Concerning Secretion)
33. 1764 – Observationes de Morbis Cognoscitivæ Curandisque (Observations on the Knowledge and Curing of Diseases)
34. 1764 – Tractatus de Affectione (A Treatise on the Passions)
35. 1765 – Physiologie Cursus: Anatomico – meccanico – experimentalis (A Course in Physiology: Anatomical – mechanical – experimental)
36. 1767 – Historiæ Morborum (A History of Diseases)
37. 1768 – Nevrologiæ Compendium (A Compendium concerning Neurology)
38. 1768 – De Integumentis (Concerning Bodily Coverings)
39. 1773 – Mannarino (Mannarino)
40. 1774 – Patologicus Brevis Cursus (A Short Course on Pathology)
41. 1776 – Tractatus de Voce Sana et Morbosa (A Treatise concerning Healthy and Sick Voices)
42. 1780 – Therapeutica Nosologia Cutanea (The Therapy of Skin Nosology)
43. 1781 – De Myologia (Concerning Myology)
44. 1781 – Tractatus Nosologia Vocalis (A Treastise on Voice Nosology)
45. 1789 – Materies Medica (Medical Matters)

== See also ==
- Philosophy in Malta

== Sources ==
- Mark Montebello, Il-Ktieb tal-Filosofija f’Malta (A Source Book of Philosophy in Malta), PIN Publications, Malta, 2001.
- Horatio C. Vella, ed., Joseph Demarco: On the Passage of Air from the Lungs into the Blood System, Malta University Press, Malta, 1999.
