= Rosarius Mary Hagius =

Maltese philosopher

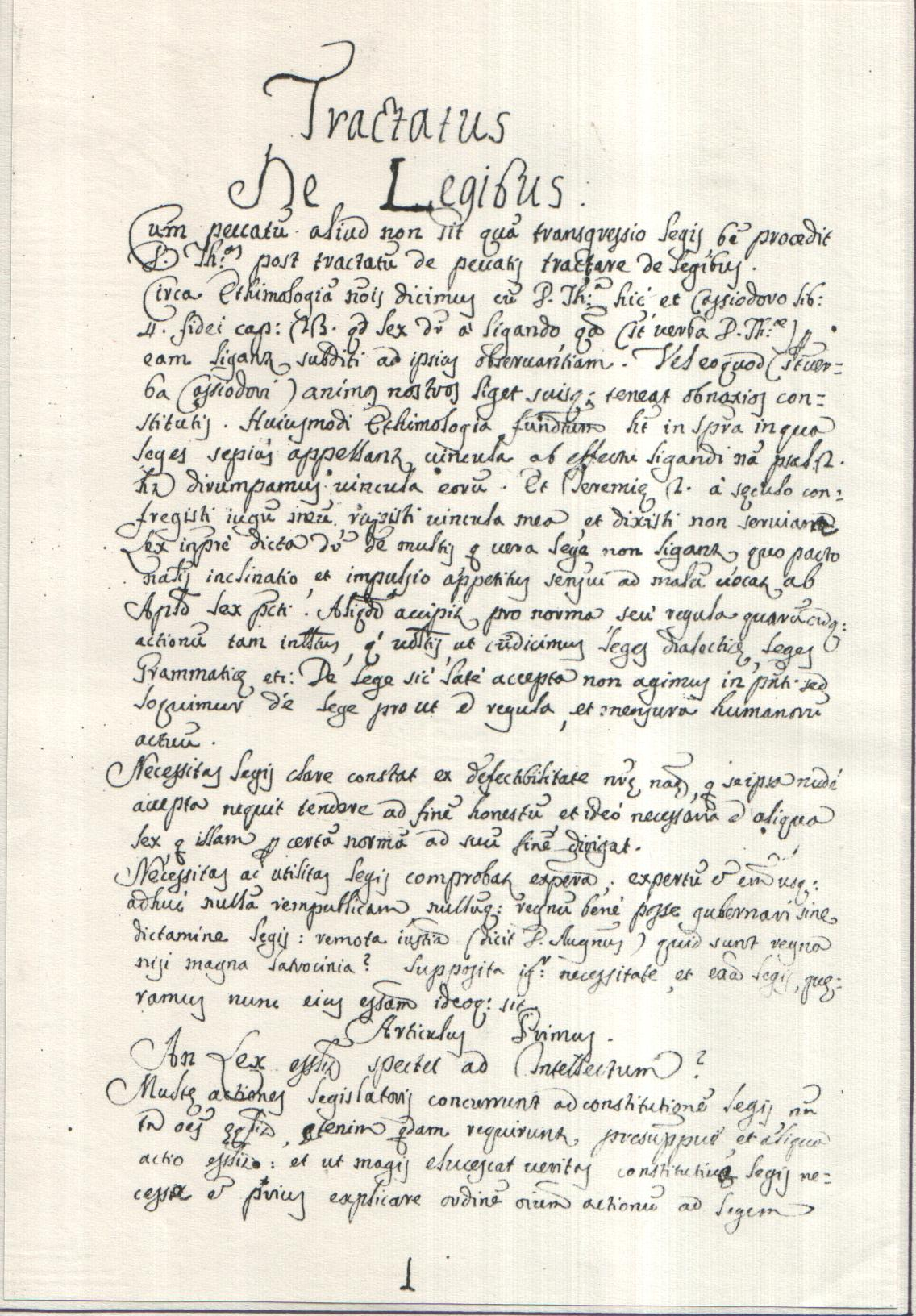
- Frontispiece of Hagius' De Legibus (1719)
- Born: 1673; Hospitaller Malta
- Died: 14 March 1757 (aged 83–84); Hospitaller Malta
- Occupations: Dominican friar; Philosopher

Rosarius Mary Hagius O.P. (1673 – 14 March 1757) was a minor Maltese philosopher who specialised mainly in metaphysics.

== Life ==
Little is known as yet about the private life of Hagius. This is unfortunate because, from his extant works, it can clearly be seen that he possessed a superior mind, and quite dexterous in both philosophy and theology. Hagius was a Dominican friar, and a Master of Theology. He taught philosophy and theology for three decades at most of Malta’s institutions of higher education, especially at the Dominican Collegium of Portus Salutis at Valletta, Malta. His method and style, both of teaching and of writing, were decidedly in the line of Aristotelic-Thomist Scholasticism. He died on March 14, 1757, and was buried in the church of Portus Salutis.

== Extant works ==
All of Hagius’ works are in Latin, and held at the National Library of Malta at Valletta, Malta. Unfortunately, no manuscript of Hagius has ever been transliterated, much less translated into any modern language, or even freshly read and studied. Though all of his works basically deal with theological subjects, Hagius consistently examines them from a philosophical point of view, seeking to give sound philosophical basis to his arguments.

Two manuscripts which had formerly been attributed to Hagius are certainly not his. These are Tractatus De Sacramento Eucharistiæ ("A Study on the Sacrament of Eucharist; 1710), and Tractatus De Adorando SSme Trinitatis Misterio ("A Study on the Worship given to the Most Holy Mystery of the Trinity; 1711).

Hagius’ extant authentic works are the following

- 1710 – Tractatus De Pœnitentiæ ("A Study on the Sacrament of Confession"); unnumbered back to back folios, and marked as MS. 32B#3 at the National Library of Malta. The work is not simply a commentary on Thomas Aquinas’s doctrines, as one might expect, but rather an original exposition by Hagius. Nonetheless, it is Scholastic in nature.
- 1715 – Tractatus De Iusticia et Jure ("A Study on Justice and Law"); unnumbered back to back folios, and marked as MS. 32B#1 at the National Library of Malta. The work was written under the guidance of the Dominican lector Vincent Farrugia. The work deals with justice and positive law from Thomas Aquinas’ point of view.
- 1716 – Tractatus De Religione ("A Study on Religion"); unnumbered back to back folios, and marked as MS. 32A#1 at the National Library of Malta. Though the major intellectual source of the work is Thomas Aquinas, it is more of a free-hand exposition by Hagius on religious worship, and the relationship with the divine. The manuscript includes four parts: De devotione ("On piety"), De oratione ("On prayer"), De sacrificio Missæ ("On the sacrifice of the Mass"), and De Voto ("On Vows").
- 1717 – Tractatus De Ultimo Fine ("A Study on the Ultimate Goal"); unnumbered back to back folios, and marked as MS. 32#1 at the National Library of Malta. The work is basically a commentary on some doctrines of Thomas Aquinas regarding the ultimate end and aim of man’s existence.
- 1718/19 – Tractatus De Virtutibus In Communi ("A Study on Virtues in General"); unnumbered back to back folios, and marked as MS. 32#2 at the National Library of Malta. Hagius writes that the work was composed under the special guidance of the Dominican philosopher Henry Ercole. It is basically a commentary of some of Thomas Aquinas’ doctrines. In fact, the manuscript itself is divided into five ‘Books’, each corresponding to the relevant parts of Aquinas’ Summa Theologiæ.
- 1719 – Tractatus De Vitiis et Peccatis ("A Study on Vices and Sins"); unnumbered back to back folios, and marked as MS. 32#3 at the National Library of Malta. Like the preceding one, this work was composed under the guidance of the Dominican philosopher Henry Ercole. Similarly, since it is a commentary of some of Thomas Aquinas’ doctrines, it is divided into sections corresponding to the relevant parts of Aquinas’ Summa Theologiæ.
- 1719 – Brevis Tractatus De Legibus ("A Short Study on Laws"); unnumbered back to back folios. Like the two former works, this was composed with the assistance of Henry Ercole too. It is an examination of all aspects, albeit in brief, of positive law.
- 1720 – Tractatus De Fide, Spe et Charitate ("A Study on Faith, Hope and Charity"); unnumbered back to back folios, and marked as MS. 59#3 at the National Library of Malta. The work deals with the three theological virtues from a Scholastic point of view.
- 1722 – De Effectu Excommunicatinis ("On the Effect of Excommunication"); unnumbered back to back folios, and marked as MS. 32B#4 at the National Library of Malta. This is an interesting work. It is not a commentary of Thomas Aquinas, as one might expect, but rather an original study by Hagius. Though the method used is clearly that common to Scholasticism, Hagius ventures to break off from the beaten track and explore themes which were usually not dealt with very frequently by Scholastics. The work is a collection of nine ‘Books’. An alternative title to the composition, entered at the head of the manuscript, is De quarto effectu Excommunicationis ("On the Four Effects of Excommunication").
- 1723 – Tractatus De Sacramento Matrimonii ("A Study on the Sacrament of Matrimony"); unnumbered back to back folios, and marked as MS. 32B#5 at the National Library of Malta. The work is a fairly straightforward exposition of the doctrine on matrimony according to the traditional style and view-point of Aristotelic-Thomist Scholasticism.
- 1740 – Tractatus de Sacra Scriptura ("A Study on Holy Scripture"); 331 back to back folios, and marked as MS. 32A#3 at the National Library of Malta. Unlike the other manuscripts in the collection, Hagius’ handwriting here is far from neat. This might suggest that, though positively inscribed by Hagius, this extant document is not a final version of the work. In fact, the manuscript is illegible at times. The work is a highly detailed and extensive study on many technicalities related to the writing and composition of the Bible.
- Undated – Tractatus De Indulgentiis ("A Study on Indulgencies"); unnumbered back to back folios, and marked as MS. 32A/2 at the National Library of Malta. Though the work is undated, it must have been composed around the first half of the 18th century. Basically it is a fierce attack on heretic doctrines concerning indulgencies.
- Undated – Tractatus De Divina Gratia ("A Study on Divine Grace"); unnumbered back to back folios, and marked as MS. 59#2 at the National Library of Malta. The work must have been composed around 1719/20. It deals with divine grace from a purely Scholastic point of view.

== See also ==
Philosophy in Malta
