= 1634 Valletta explosion =

Gunpowder factory explosion in Malta

Valletta gunpowder factory explosion
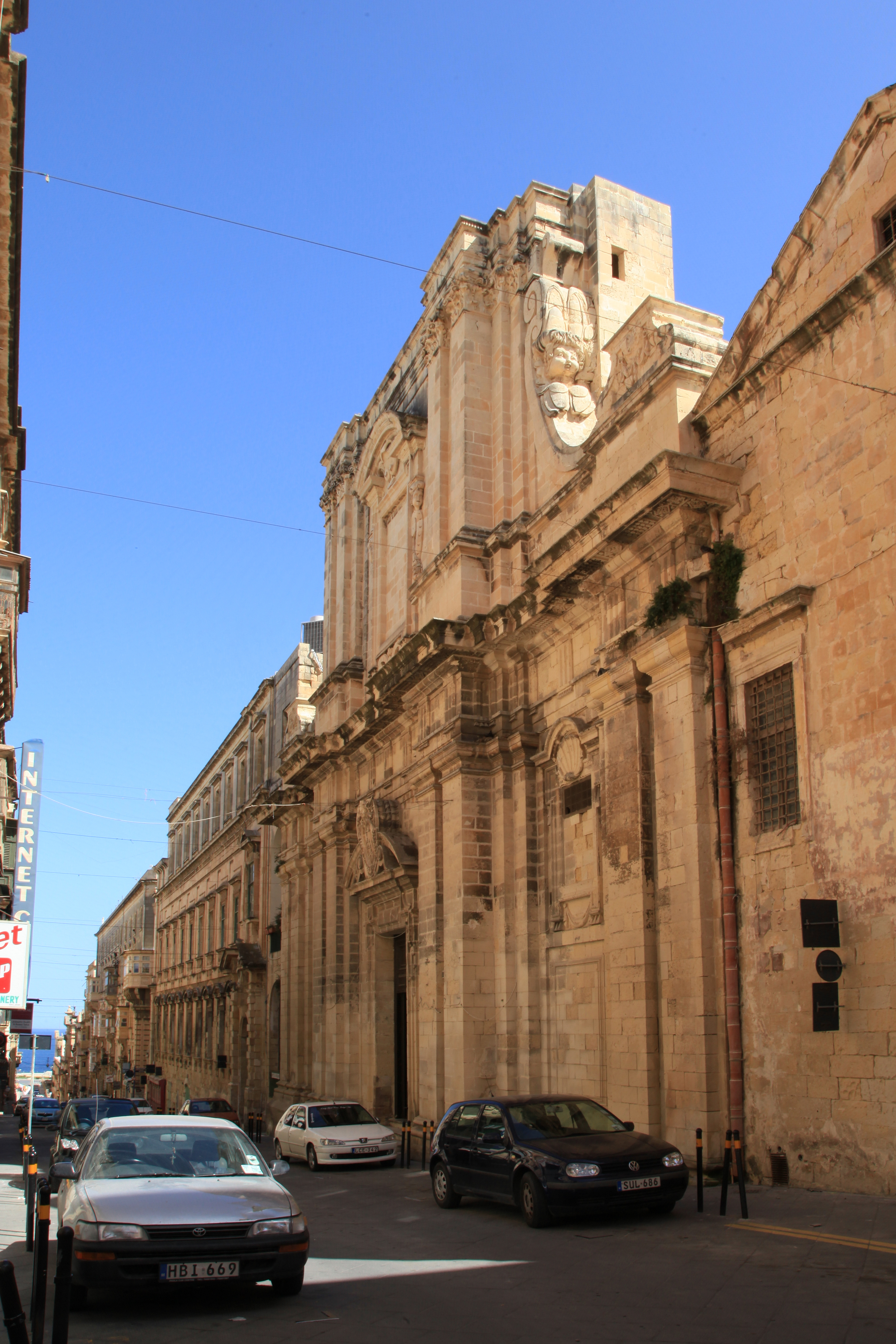
- The Jesuit church, which was severely damaged in the explosion
- Date: 12 September 1634
- Location: Valletta, Malta; 35°53′56″N 14°30′57″E
- Type: Gunpowder factory explosion
- Deaths: 22
- Injuries: Unknown
- Property damage: Significant

On 12 September 1634, a Hospitaller gunpowder factory in Valletta, Malta accidentally blew up, killing 22 people and causing severe damage to a number of buildings. The factory had been built at some time in the late 16th or early 17th centuries, replacing an earlier one in Fort St. Angelo in Birgu. It was located in the lower part of Valletta, close to the Slaves' Prison.

The explosion damaged the nearby Jesuit church and college. The church's façade was rebuilt in around 1647 by the architect Francesco Buonamici, while the damaged parts of the college were also rebuilt after the explosion.

The gunpowder factory was not rebuilt. In around 1667, a new factory was constructed in Floriana, far away from any residential areas. This factory was incorporated into the Ospizio complex in the early 18th century.

== See also ==
- 1806 Birgu polverista explosion
