= George Sagnani =

Maltese philosopher

- Born: 1667; Malta
- Died: 1732; Malta
- Occupation: Philosophy

George Sagnani (18th century) was a minor Maltese philosopher who specialized mainly in ethics and morals.

== Life ==
Little is known as yet about the private life of Sagnani. He spent his entire adult life in Valletta at the Collegium Melitense, the old University of Malta. Since he was a Jesuit priest, and the college was attached to a Jesuit convent, Sagnani lived and lectured there all his life, and even died there. He had joined the Jesuit congregation in 1686 at nineteen years of age. At the Collegium, Sagnani taught philosophy and, during the latter part of his academic career, moral theology.

== Extant work ==
Only one work of Sagnani seems to have survived. It is a manuscript in Latin, and held at the National Library of Malta in Valletta, marked as MS. 4, and is part of a miscellaneous volume of documents compiled by Ignatius Xavier Caruana under the title Stromatum Melitensium. The extant document is made up of 30 back to back folios. It is the following:

- 1700 – Trutina Teologico-Moralis (A Theological-Moral Reflection). The sub-title reads: Super Dubio Teologico-Moralis (On a Theological-Moral Uncertainty). Unfortunately, this work does not sufficiently attest to Sagnani’s philosophical prowess, in the sense that in it he concentrates more on theological and moral arguments rather that philosophical ones.

=== Responses ===
What’s interesting is that the compiler who included Sagnani’s work in his collection also saw it fit to include two responses to it. These are given immediately after Sagnani’s manuscript within the same bound volume. One response is by Carl Borg, and another by some anonymous writer. The nature of these responses are certainly not philosophical. These might have been students of Sagnani himself. Their short works respond to some of Sagnani’s arguments along theological and moral lines.

== See also ==
Philosophy in Malta

== Sources ==
- Mark Montebello, Il-Ktieb tal-Filosofija f’Malta (A Source Book of Philosophy in Malta), PIN Publications, Malta, 2001.
