= Henry Ercole =

18th century Maltese philosopher

- Born: Unknown; Malta
- Died: 1764; Malta
- Occupation: Philosophy

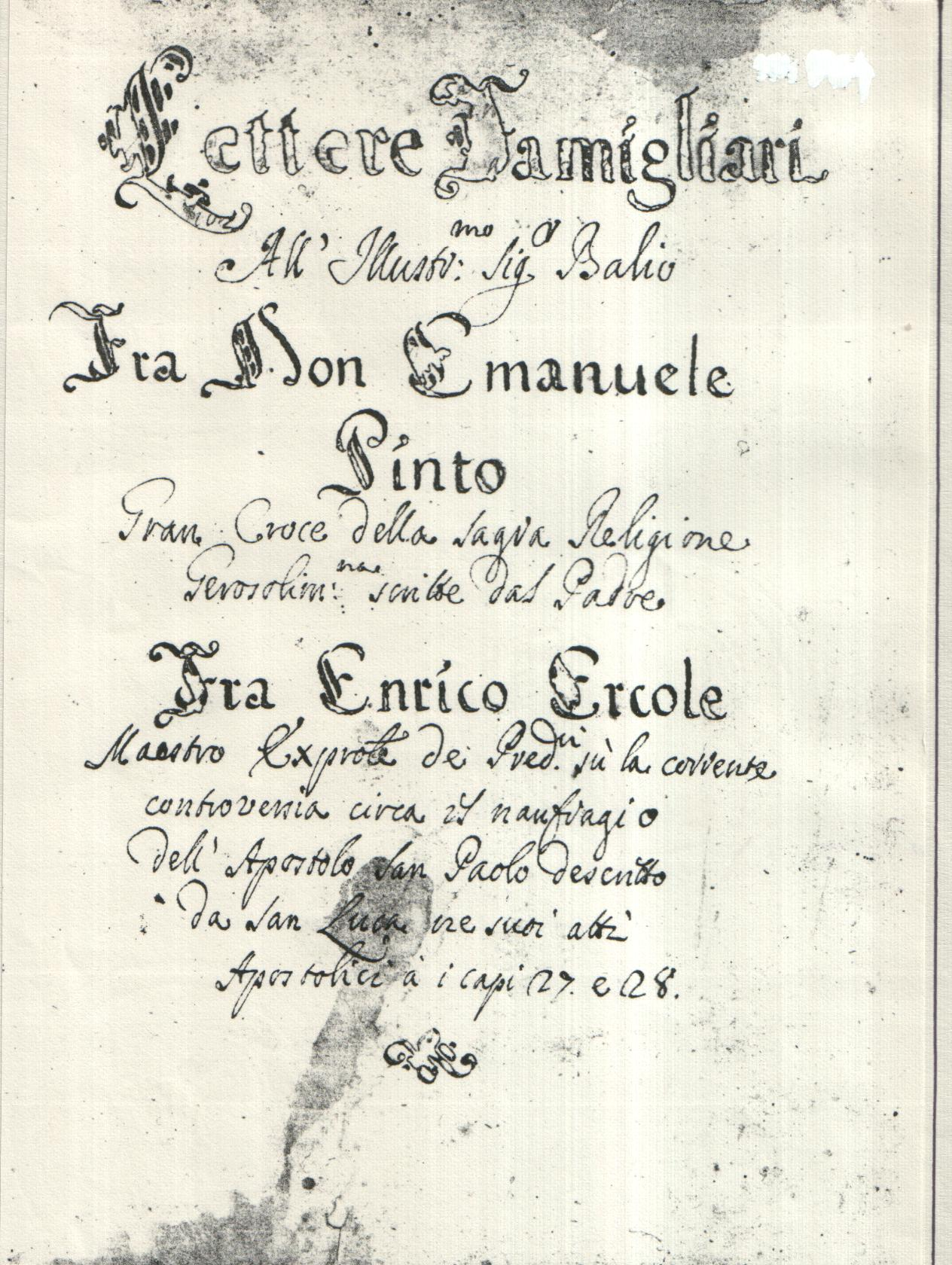
Frontispiece of Ercole's Lettere Famigliari

Henry Ercole (died 1764) was a minor Maltese philosopher who specialised mainly in ethics and logic. He enjoyed great esteem from his contemporaries, both as an administrator and a philosopher.

== Life ==
It is unclear where Ercole was born in Malta or when. He was a Dominican friar, but it is not known where he completed his initial studies. The first documentary evidence about him is in 1711, when he was Master of Studies at the Studium Generale of the Dominicans at Rabat, Malta. Four years later, in 1715, he held the same office at Trapani, Sicily.

For an unknown reason, some time between 1716 and 1718 Ercole was expelled from Sicily by royal decree, and returned to Malta. He acquired his Baccalaureate in theology between 1718 and 1722. In this latter year, Ercole was appointed Master of Studies at the Dominican Collegium Generale of Valletta, Malta. A year later, in 1723, he became Master of Theology.

In 1724, Ercole was chosen as Prior Provincial of the Dominican province of Sicily (which included Malta). This was at Caltanisetta, and Ercole was the first Maltese Dominican friar to achieve such a position. He remained in this office until 1726, then returned to Malta. He lived at the convent of Valletta, where, in 1734, he was chosen as Prior of the community. Ercole was twice the Vicar-General of the Maltese Dominicans on behalf of the Sicilian Prior Provincial. The second time was between 1738 and 1741.

From 1711 onwards, Ercole taught philosophy and theology. He was particularly close to the Grand Master of the Knights Hospitallers, Manuel Pinto da Fonseca, who consistently showered upon him innumerable favours. This stands as witness to Ercole's position of high regard.

Unfortunately, no portrait of him has been discovered as yet.

== Extant works ==
Very few works of Ercole seem to have survived. Three works by Rosarius Mary Hagius declare that Ercole gave his assistance in their composition, though they fall short of asserting that he was their co-author.

Only one light work is certainly his: Lettere Famigliari (Convivial Letters), dedicated to Grand Master Manuel Pinto da Fonseca. The manuscript, which is held at National Library of Malta in Valletta, and marked as MS. 759, is made up of 231 folios (though in the extant document the last six pages are missing). The work is a collection of twenty-six letters, all signed, in which Ercole imagines writing to scholars who had put in doubt the shipwreck of St. Paul on Malta back in the 1st century as recounted in the Bible (Acts of the Apostles, Chapters 27–28). To illustrate his point, he also pens down a crude map of the Mediterranean Sea.

Ercole's writing is not a piece of rhetorical work, as one might expect with such themes. It is an interesting scholastic disputation concentrating on the logic of statements put forward by the proponents. Ercole skillfully draws out certain main points, and examines their logical content and their syntax.

Apart from this work, it is possible that other compositions exist from Ercole's hand. However, they might not bear his name, and much research is still needed to ascribe authorship to him.

== Sources ==
- Mark Montebello, Il-Ktieb tal-Filosofija f’Malta (A Source Book of Philosophy in Malta), PIN Publications, Malta, 2001.

== See also ==
- Philosophy in Malta
