= Church of the Jesuits, Valletta =

Church of the Circumcision of the Lord
- Knisja taċ-Ċirkonċiżjoni tal-Mulej
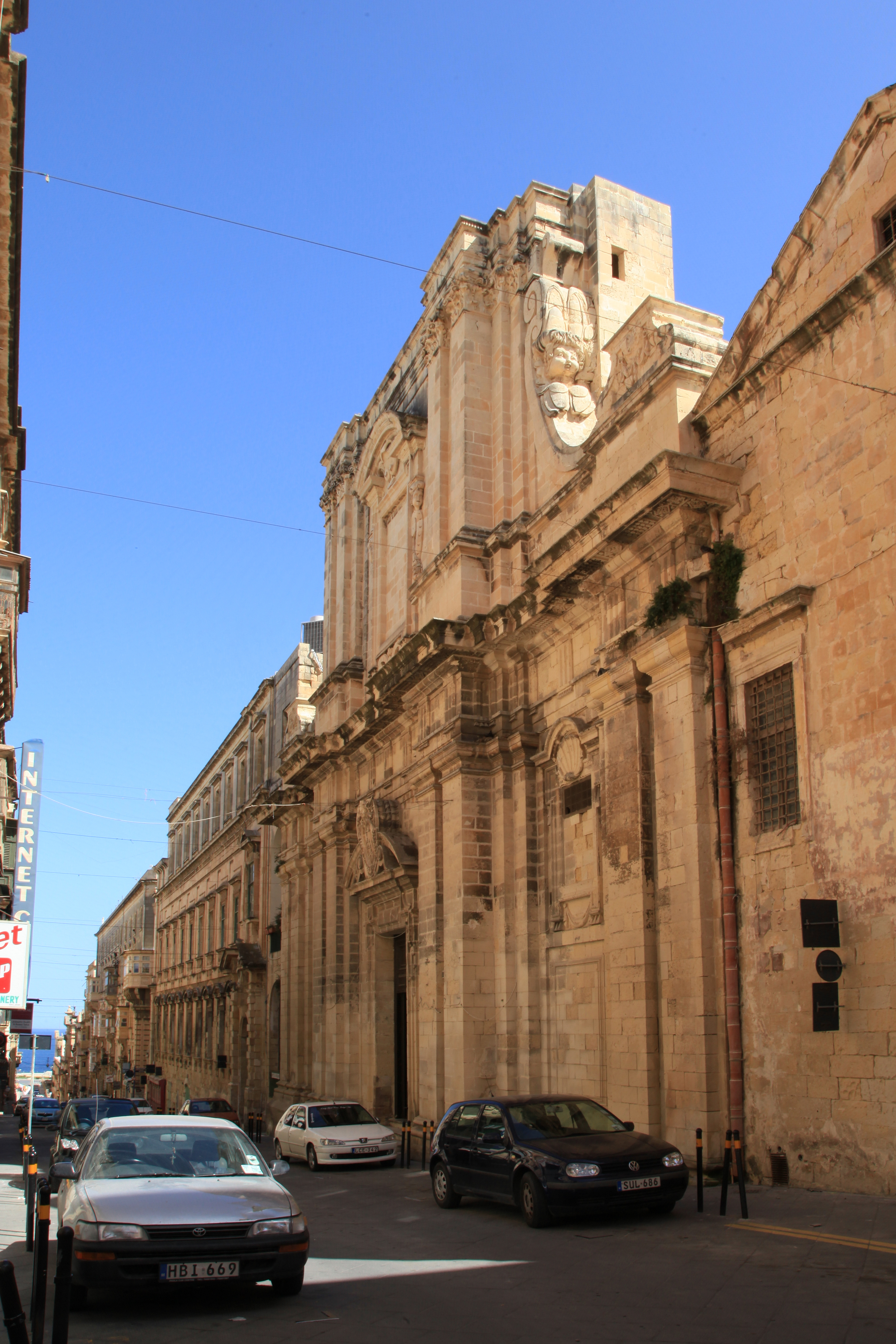

- Location within Malta
- 35°53′54″N 14°30′55″E
- Location: Valletta
- Country: Malta
- Denomination: Roman Catholic

History
- Status: Active
- Dedication: Circumcision of Jesus

Architecture
- Functional status: Church
- Architect: Francesco Buonamici
- Architectural type: Church
- Style: Baroque
- Years built: 1593–1609; 17th century (major reconstruction)

Specifications
- Materials: Limestone

Administration
- Archdiocese: Malta

Clergy
- Archbishop: Charles Scicluna
- Rector: Philip Calleja

The Church of the Circumcision of Our Lord (Maltese: Knisja taċ-Ċirkonċiżjoni tal-Mulej), also known as the Church of the Jesuits (Maltese: Knisja tal-Ġiżwiti) or the Church of the University (Maltese: Knisja tal-Università), is one of the oldest and largest churches in Valletta, Malta. It was originally built between 1593 and 1609 by the Jesuit order, and it is located adjacent to the Old University Building, which originally housed a Jesuit college known as the Collegium Melitense. The church was rebuilt in the Baroque style by Francesco Buonamici after suffering extensive damage in an explosion in 1634. The church remained in use after the Jesuits were expelled from Malta in 1768, and it is also used for Masters and Doctoral graduation ceremonies of the University of Malta, the successor to the Collegium.

== History ==
Construction of the church began in November 1593, when its foundations were laid down. It formed part of a Jesuit complex occupying an entire city block, which also included the Collegium Melitense (now the Old University Building) that was constructed between 1595 and 1602. Construction of the church was completed in 1609.

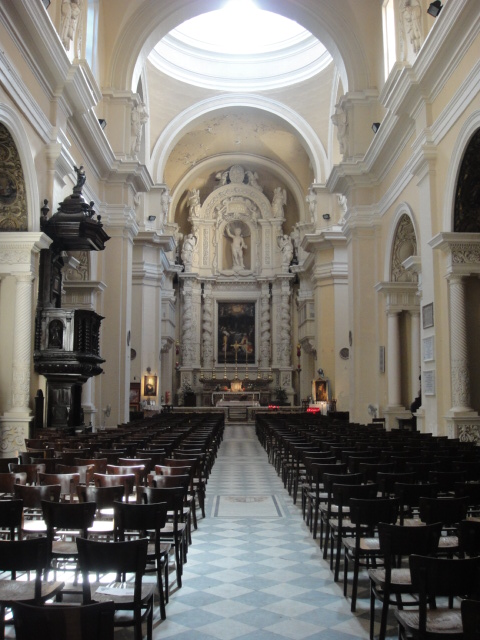
The church's interior

On 12 September 1634, a gunpowder factory explosion caused serious damage to both the church and college. Most of the church, including its façade, was subsequently rebuilt in the Baroque style by the Luccan architect and engineer Francesco Buonamici. Although works continued throughout the 17th century, the façade still seems to be incomplete. The buildings also suffered some damage during the 1693 Sicily earthquake.

The church's interior is decorated using the Doric order. Its plan followed the Church of the Gesù in Rome, with four-bay nave and seven side chapels; the eighth, Onorati Congregation Chapel, opening from the nave leading to a door onto Archbishop Street.

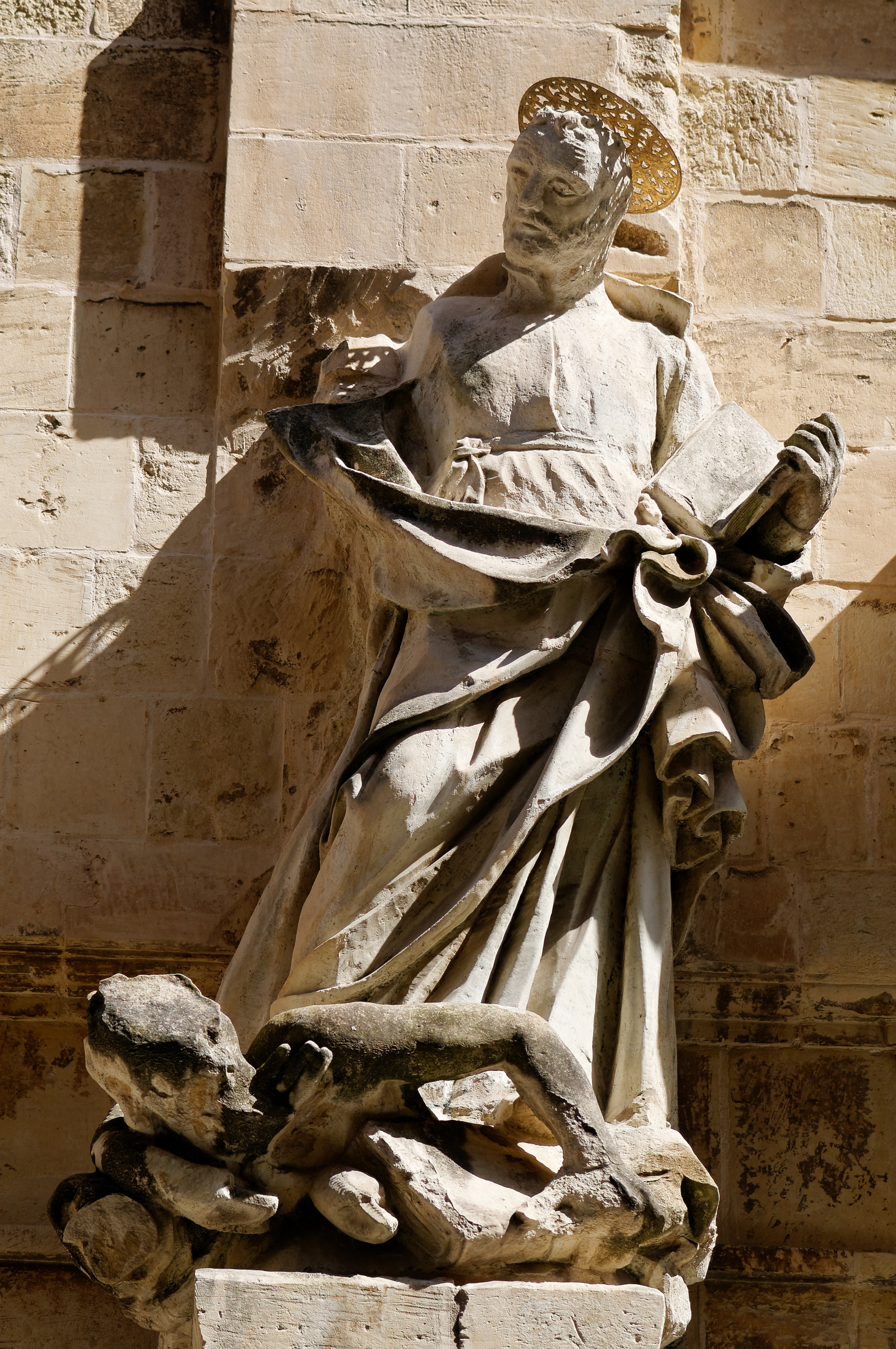
Statue of Saint Ignatius of Loyola located over the entrance to the old university building

The Jesuits were expelled from Malta by Grand Master Manuel Pinto da Fonseca in 1768, and the building became property of the Treasury of the Order of St. John. However, the church remained open and a conventual chaplain was chosen to take care of it. Studies at the college also continued, and the University of Malta was established in 1769 to take its place. The church was used for the University's degree conferment ceremonies until the 1960s, when the institution moved to a new campus at Tal-Qroqq in Msida. Masters and Doctoral graduation ceremonies are still held inside the church.

The church building is listed on the National Inventory of the Cultural Property of the Maltese Islands. The church's interior and exterior were restored between 1996 and 2002, and its façade, roof and dome were again restored between 2016 and 2018, along with the façade of the adjacent Old University Building.

== Artworks ==
The church's altarpiece depicts the Circumcision of Jesus, and it is the work of the Italian artist Filippo Paladini. The church contains other paintings ranging from the late 16th century to the late 18th century, including works by Baldass Peruzzi, Stefano Erardi, Nicolo de Simoni and Mattia Preti.

== See also ==
- Culture of Malta
- History of Malta
- List of churches in Malta
- Religion in Malta
- List of Jesuit sites
