= Old University Building, Valletta =

Old University Building
- L-Università l-Qadima
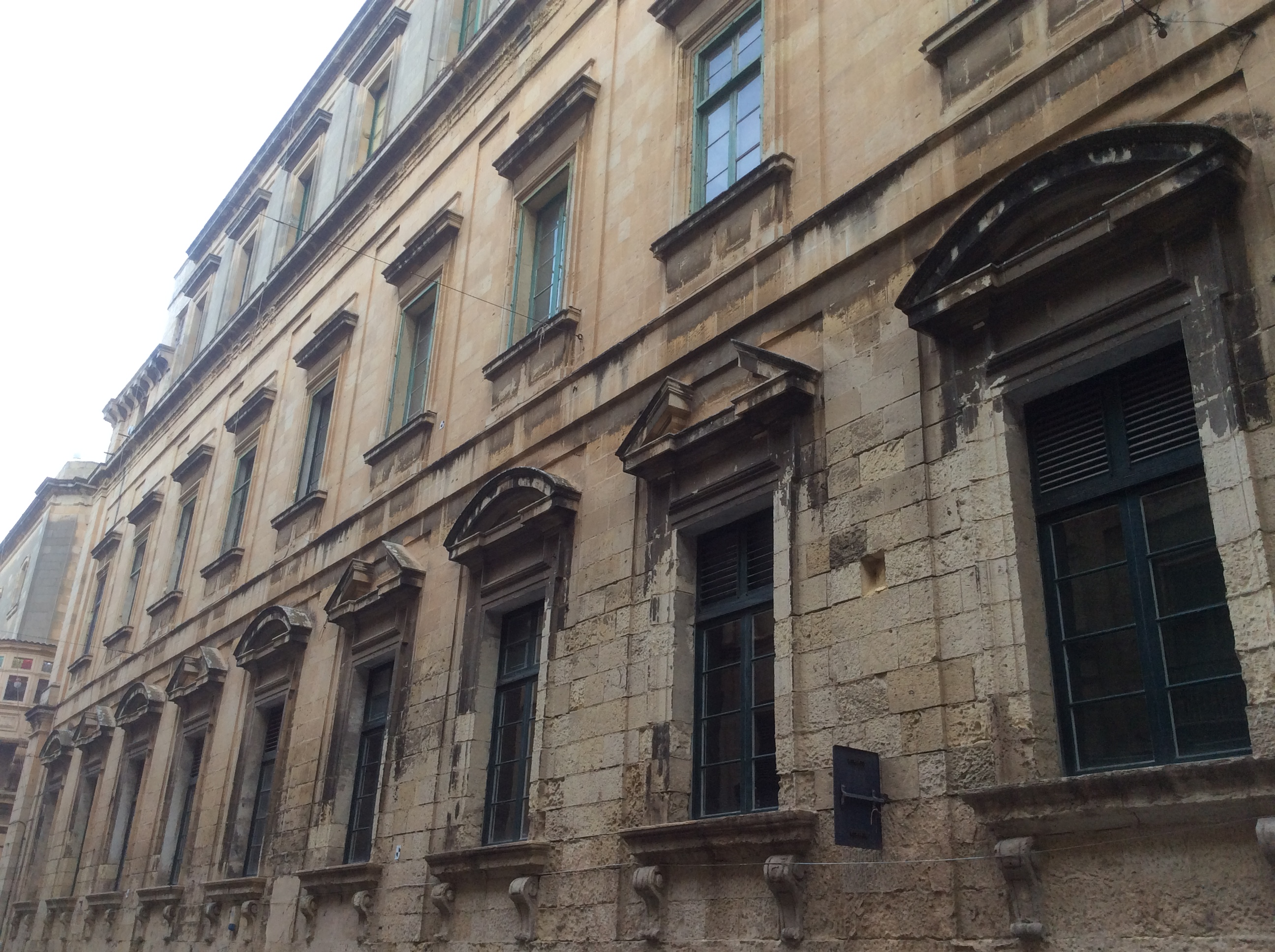
- Part of the façade of the Old University Building in Merchants Street
- Interactive map of the Old University Building area
- Former names: Collegium Melitense Societatis Jesu
- Alternative names: Valletta Campus

General information
- Status: Intact
- Type: Educational building
- Architectural style: Renaissance
- Location: Valletta, Malta
- Coordinates: 35°53′54″N 14°30′56″E
- Construction started: 4 September 1595
- Completed: 1602
- Opened: 1597
- Owner: University of Malta (since mid-2020)

Technical details
- Material: Limestone
- Floor count: 3

Design and construction
- Architects: Giuseppe Valeriano; Francesco Buonamici

The Old University Building (Maltese: L-Università l-Qadima or L-Università l-Antika), also known as the Valletta Campus, is the original campus of the University of Malta, located adjacent to the Church of the Jesuits in Valletta, Malta. Construction of the building began in 1595, and it originally housed a Jesuit college known as the Collegium Melitense Societatis Jesu. The building had to be repaired after being damaged in an explosion in 1634 and an earthquake in 1693.

The University of Malta was established in 1769 after the Jesuits were expelled, and it continued to use the same building. Although the university moved to a much larger campus at Tal-Qroqq in Msida in the 1960s, the Old University Building still houses a number of university departments and it is used for some lectures and conferences.

== History ==
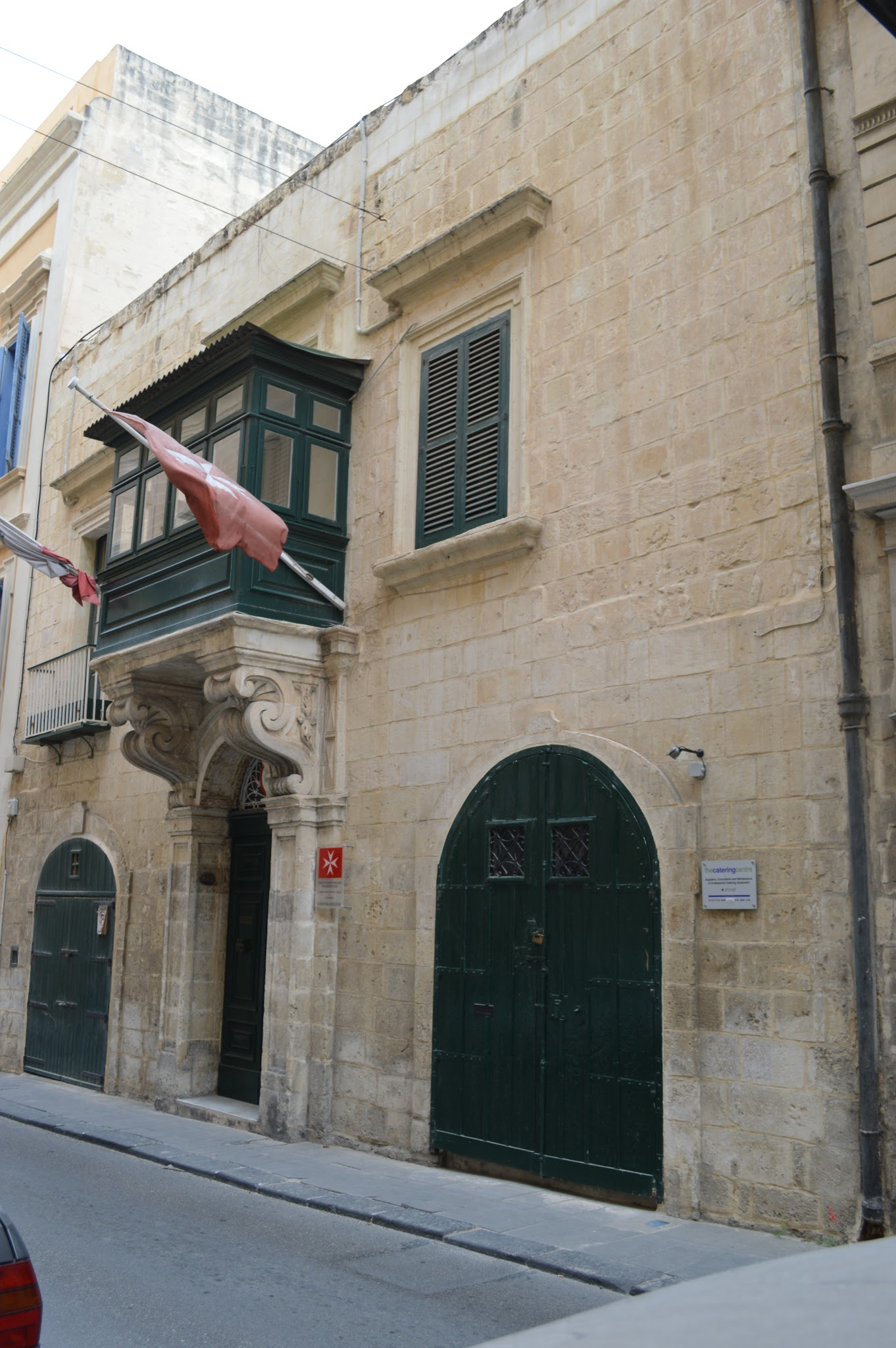
Palazzino Sapienti (house built by the last English knight) - originally part of the Old University campus which housed the office of the top officials

=== Background and construction ===
The precursor to the University of Malta was the Collegium Melitense Societatis Jesu, a Jesuit college which was set up on 12 November 1592. This was originally located in an old house in Valletta, but a new complex to house the college and a Jesuit church had already been commissioned by Bishop Tommaso Gargallo. The building was designed by Giuseppe Valeriano (later alterations were carried out by other architects, possibly including Vincenzo Casanova).

Construction of the present building began on 4 September 1595 when the foundation stone was laid down by Grand Master Martin Garzez. Construction proceeded quickly, and the college moved into the building in 1597, while construction was completed in 1602. The church was completed in 1609.

=== Use and events ===
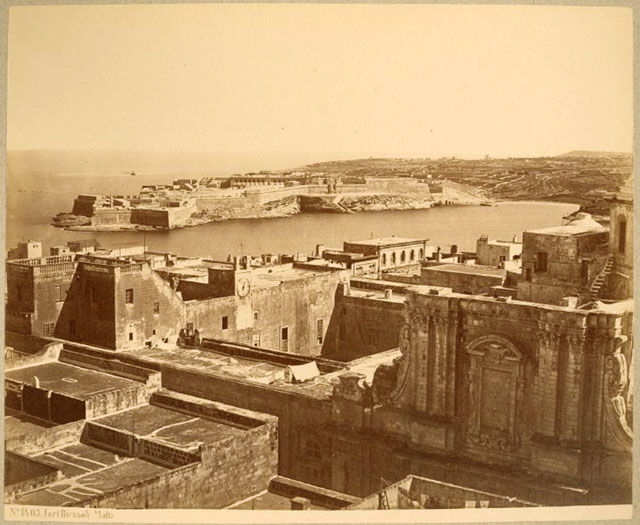
Old University building and Church of the Jesuits in a photo by Giorgio Sommer ca. 1880

On 12 September 1634, both the college and the adjacent church were severely damaged when a gunpowder factory exploded. The buildings were repaired, and the church had its façade completely rebuilt. The new design was entrusted to Francesco Buonamici. Further damage occurred during the 1693 Sicily earthquake. In 1695, a sundial with a Latin inscription was installed on the rear of the building. In the early 18th century, part of the building was converted into a permanent exhibition by housing artifacts from Ciantar's antiquities collection which came from his former residence in Marsa. This brought the attention of several historians at the time, raising the interest of antiquity in Malta at the time. However, soon after the expulsion of the Jesuits, the collection went sparse among those interested to acquire them with minimal concern over the preservation of the artifacts.

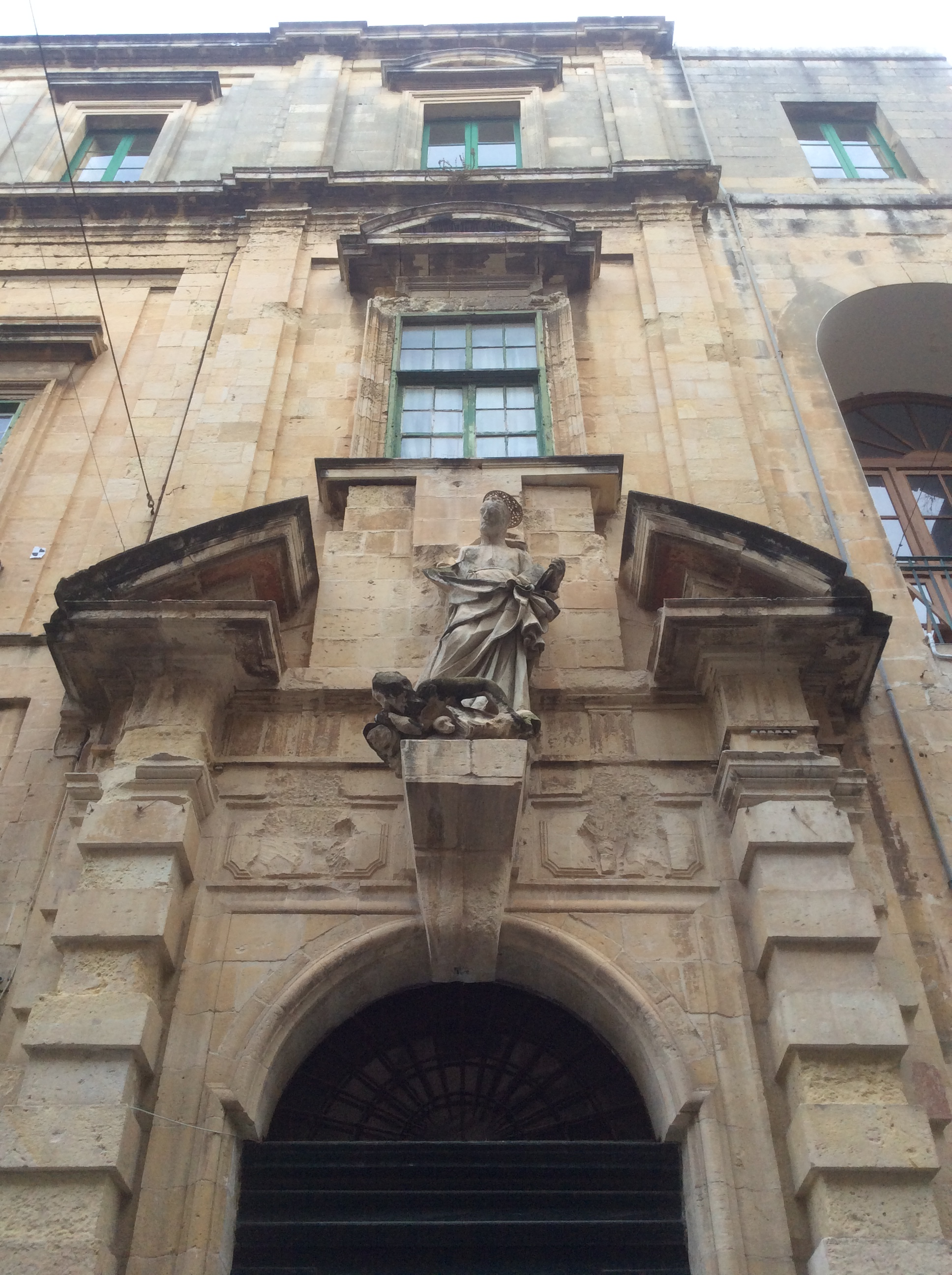
Portal of the Old University Building

The Jesuits were expelled from Malta in 1768, and the building became property of the Treasury of the Order of St. John. However, studies continued and the professors retained their posts. The Pope confirmed the founding of the university of Malta on 20 October 1769. The University of Malta officially came to existence on 22 November 1769, when Grand Master Manuel Pinto da Fonseca signed a decree constituting a Pubblica Università di Studi Generali. The university was briefly suspended during the magistracy of Francisco Ximénez de Tejada in the 1770s, but it was reconstituted by his successor Emmanuel de Rohan-Polduc in 1779.

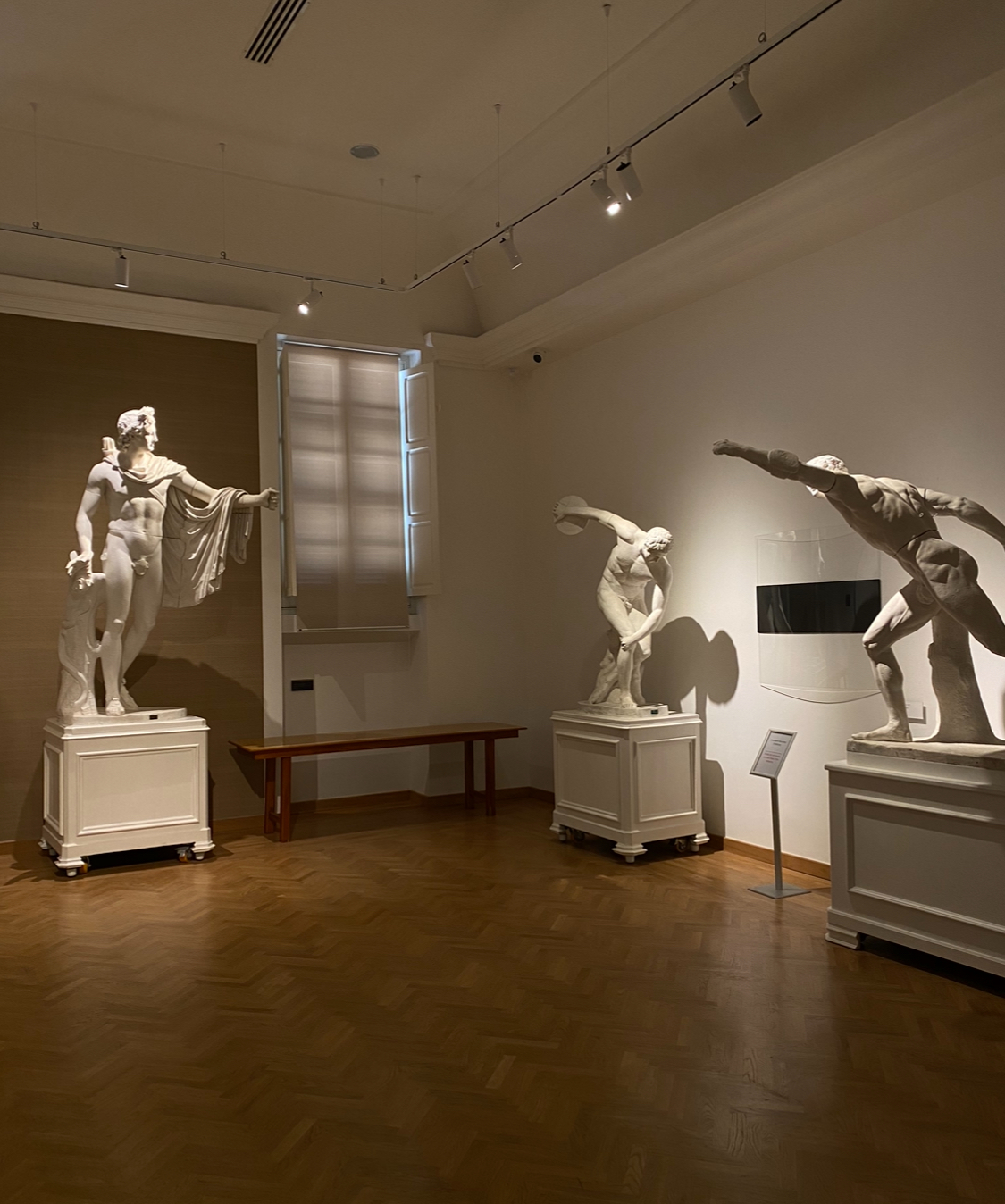
Sculptures in Aula Prima at the Old University Building.

The university was replaced by the École Centrale during the French occupation of Malta from 1798 to 1800, but was once again reopened by Sir Alexander Ball during the British Protectorate of Malta. Parts of the building were rented out as commercial rooms in the early 19th century, amongst which was the first bank of Malta (the Anglo-Maltese Bank) found on 20 June 1809. The commercial rooms were reconstructed in 1810. In May 1824, a secondary entrance decorated with the British coat of arms was opened in the rear of the building. During World War II, the building housed an Air Raid Precautions Centre. At times, it also housed the Anglo-Maltese Library and the Lyceum.

Over time, the campus became too small to house the entire university. Evans Laboratories (now known as Evans Building), a building near the Sacra Infermeria in Valletta, was inaugurated in 1959 in order to house the Faculty of Science. In 1968, the Medical School moved to a building near St. Luke's Hospital in Gwardamanġa. The university opened a much larger campus at Tal-Qroqq in Msida in the late 1960s, and most Faculties moved there. The university only retained the first floor of the Valletta building, and moved out of the second floor in 1978. However, the university refurbished and reopened the second floor once again in 2011.

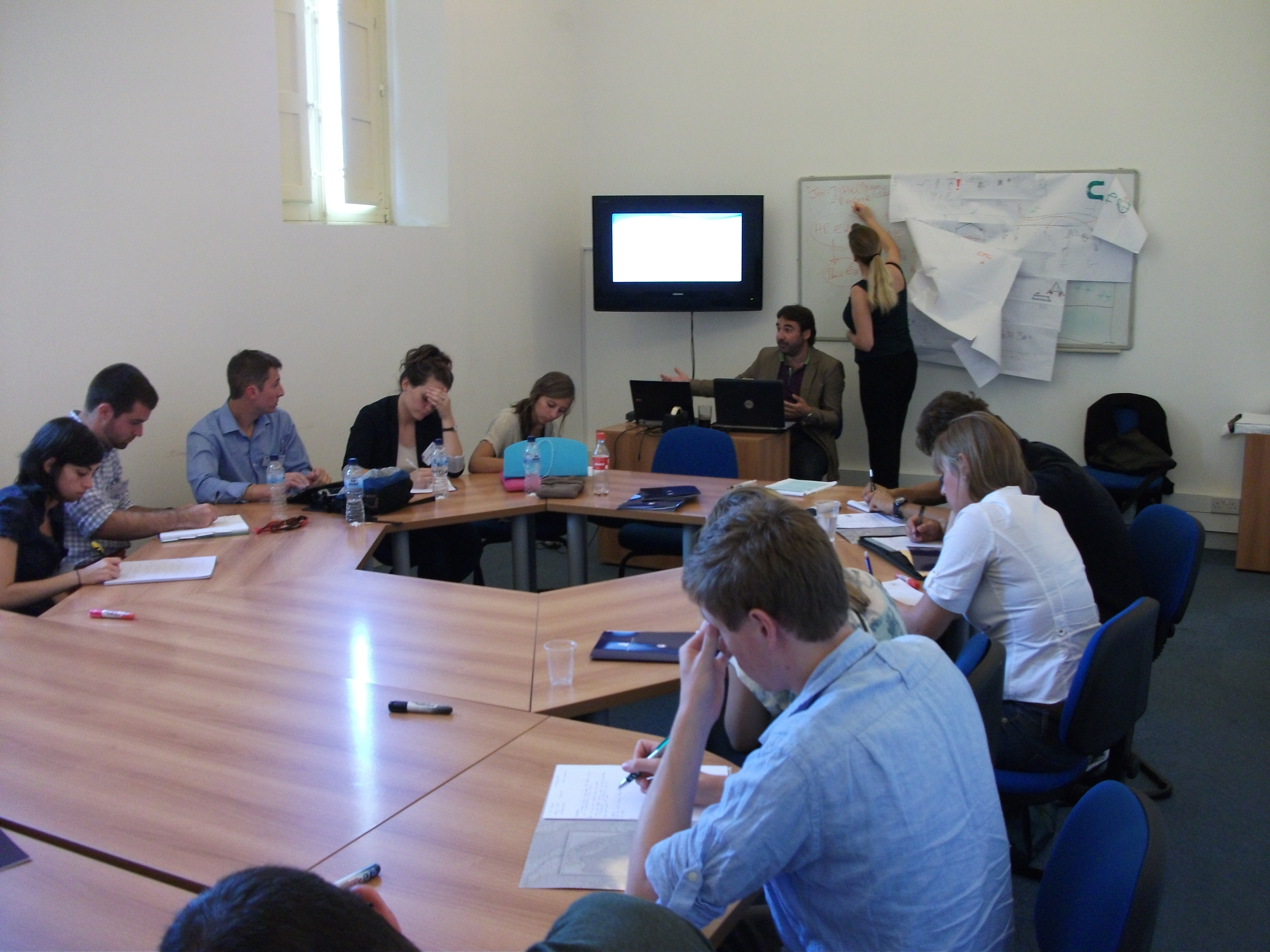
Lectures at the Valletta Campus

The Old University Building is now one of the three campuses of the University of Malta, the others being the Msida campus and the Gozo Campus in Xewkija. At one point, the head offices of Heritage Malta were located within the building. Today, the Valletta Campus houses the International Collaborative Programmes, the Research Innovation & Development Trust and the Conferences and Events Unit. It is also used for international conferences and seminars, along with a number of short courses and summer schools.

=== Heritage and restoration ===
The Old University Building is listed on the National Inventory of the Cultural Property of the Maltese Islands. The façades of the Old University Building and the adjacent church were restored between 2016 and 2019.

== Architecture ==
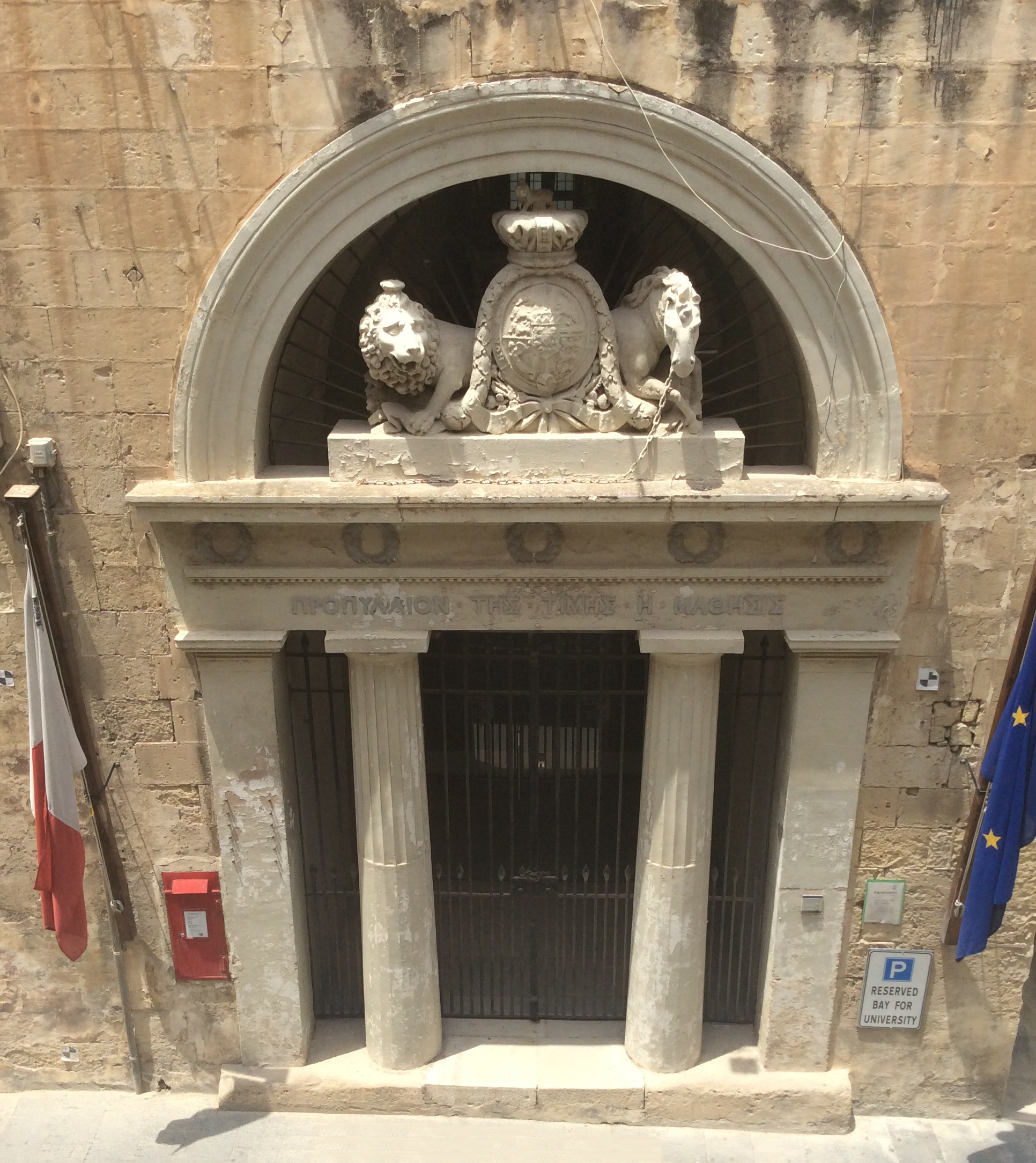
The rear entrance with the British coat of arms

The Old University Building is located within a city block bordered by Merchants, St. Christopher, St. Paul and Archbishop Streets, and it is located adjacent to the Jesuit church, which was constructed at the same time as the college. The building is three stories high. Its plan is typical of Renaissance-era public buildings, consisting of rooms built around a central courtyard. These include lecture halls, classrooms and cells for the Jesuit priests, all connected to corridors. Today, some of the cells are used as offices. The building also contains a number of boardrooms, lecture rooms, meeting rooms, an auditorium and an Aula Magna.

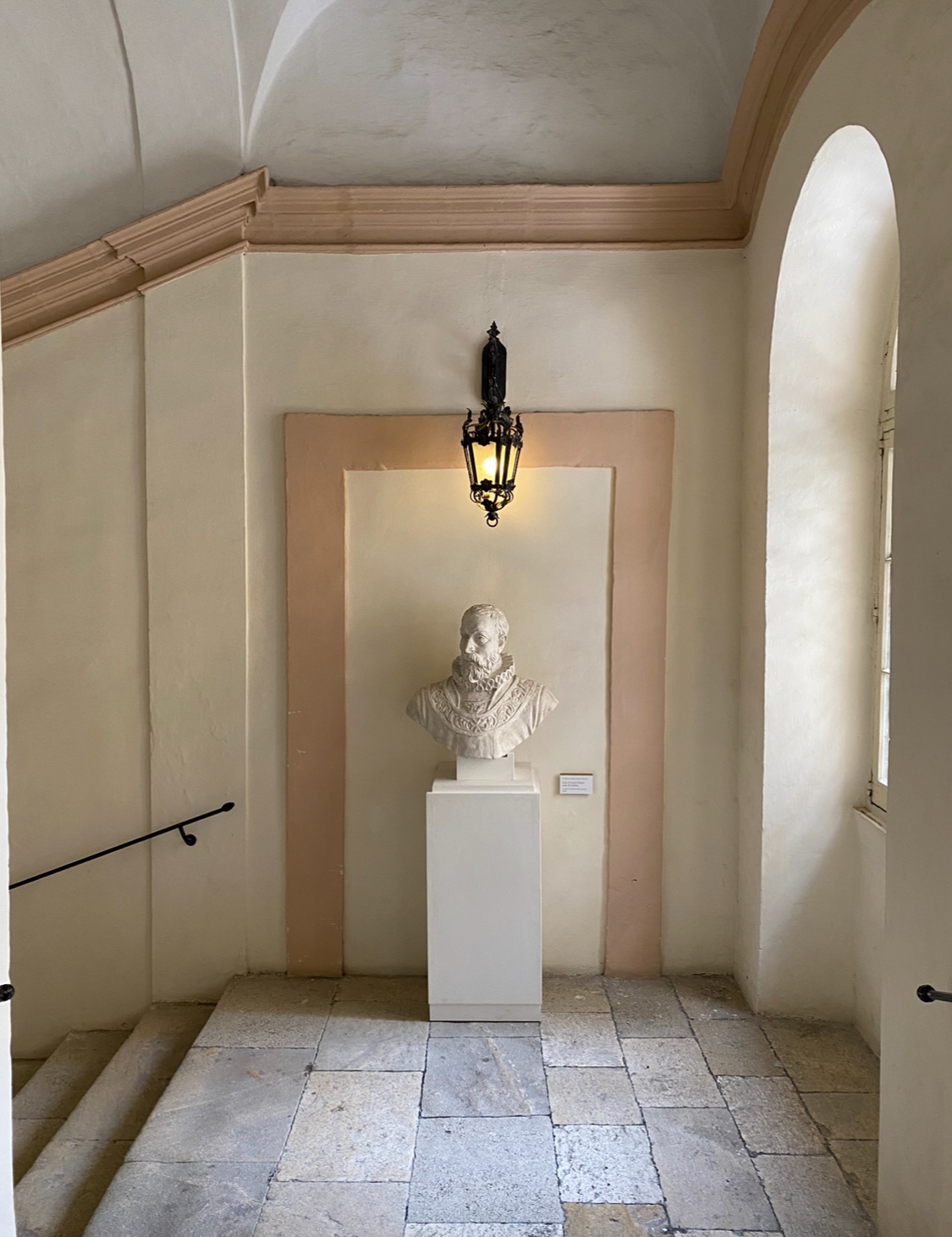
Stairway at the University of Malta Valletta Campus.

The rear entrance which was opened in 1824 is an example of neoclassical architecture, and it consists of an archway with two Doric columns supporting a lintel, above which is a representation of the Royal coat of arms of the United Kingdom. The lintel bears a Greek inscription meaning "learning is the gateway to distinction". This gate is commonly attributed to Giorgio Pullicino, who was the professor of architecture at the university at the time. It has also been attributed to Colonel George Whitmore of the Royal Engineers, but this is unlikely. The design seems to have been inspired from the Hôtel d'Hallwyll by Claude Nicolas Ledoux, which was built in Paris in 1766–70.

== See also ==
- List of Jesuit sites
