= Slaves' Prison =

- il-Ħabs il-Kbir
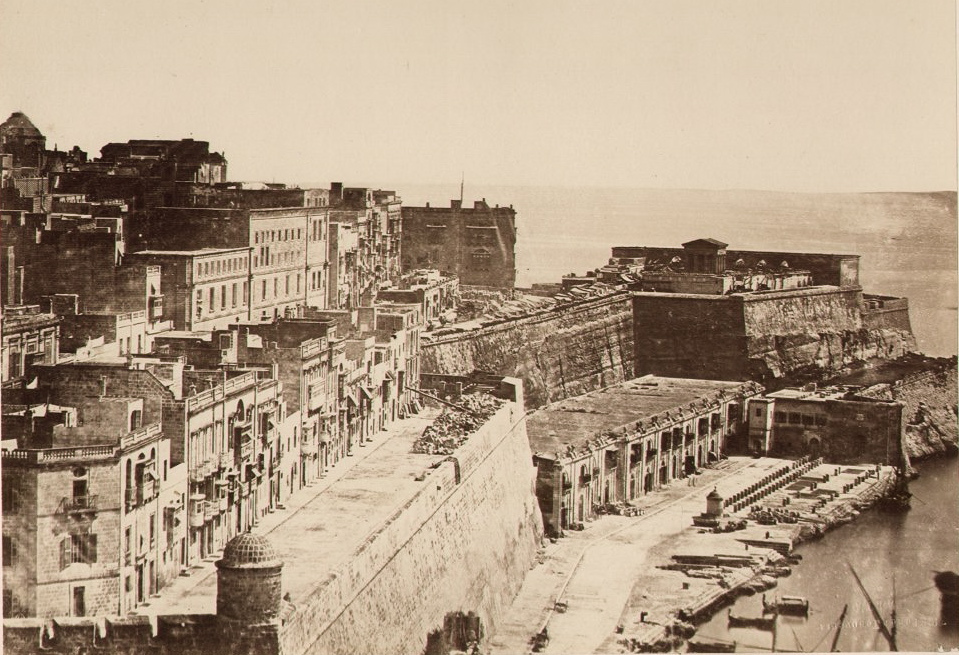
- View of the Slaves' Prison on the centre-left
- Interactive map of Slaves' Prison
- Alternative names: Gran Prigione; Bagnio

General information
- Status: Destroyed
- Type: Prison
- Location: Valletta, Malta
- Coordinates: 35°53′52.2″N 14°31′0.1″E
- Completed: c. 1585
- Destroyed: 1940s–50s

Technical details
- Material: Limestone
- Floor count: 3

Design and construction
- Architect: probably Girolamo Cassar

The Slaves' Prison (Italian: Bagni degli Schiavi, Maltese: Il-Ħabs tal-Iskjavi) officially known as the Grand Prison (Italian: Gran Prigione; Maltese: il-Ħabs il-Kbir) and colloquially as the bagnio, was a prison in Valletta, Malta. It was established in the late 16th century, and remained in use as a prison throughout the 17th and 18th centuries. It was subsequently used as a naval hospital, a school and an examination hall. It was bombed in World War II, and the ruins were demolished to make way for a block of flats.

== History ==
The Gran Prigione (Grand Prison) was established around 1585 during the magistracy of Hugues Loubenx de Verdalle (1582–95). It was probably designed by the architect Girolamo Cassar. The building served as the Order of St. John's main prison, as well as a compound in which slaves were locked up at night. It could house around 900 inmates.

After 1615, the prison was supplied by water from the Wignacourt Aqueduct. A Turkish slave who had been a hydrologist in Constantinople reportedly helped in the construction of the aqueduct, and in recognition of his work he was given his freedom and the prison became one of the first buildings in Valletta to be supplied by running water.

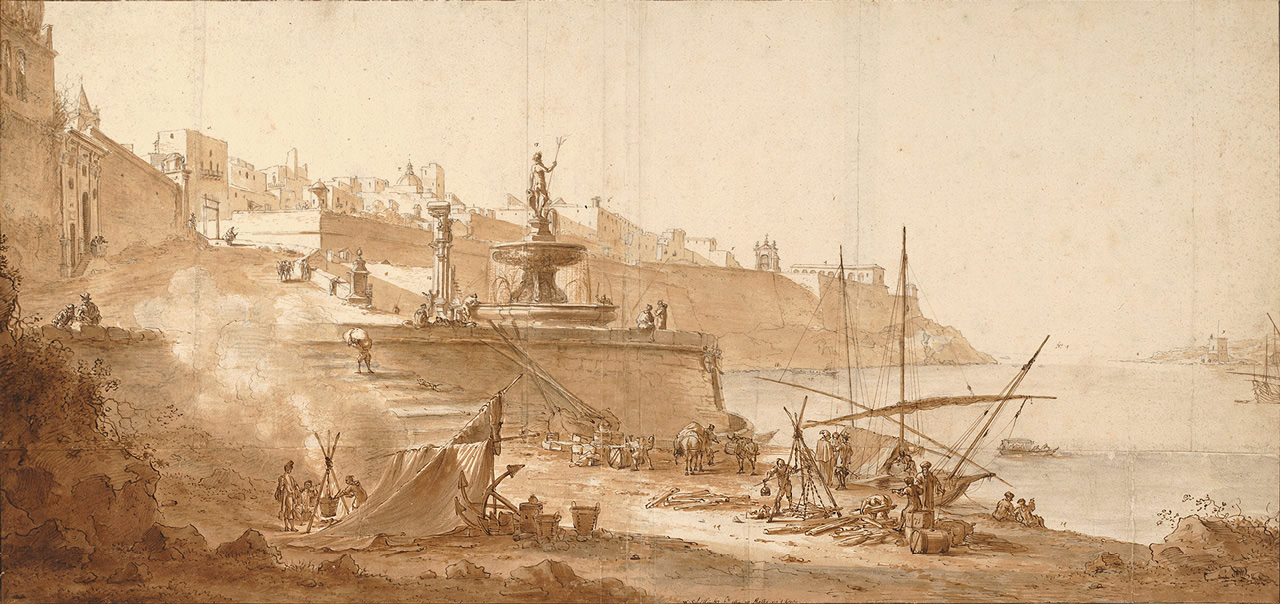
The building as depicted in 1664 from the site of the Nuova Fontana, generally known as the Fountain of Neptune

By 1631, part of the building was used as the Infermeria delle Schiavi, a hospital where ill land-bound slaves were treated. Sick galley slaves were not treated there but at the Great Magazine Ward of the nearby Sacra Infermeria.

In the Conspiracy of the Slaves of 1749, slaves at the Grandmaster's Palace planned to revolt, free the other slaves from the Slaves' Prison, and take over Fort Saint Elmo and the rest of Valletta. After the plot was discovered and brutally suppressed, a decree was issued stating that all slaves were to be locked up at the prison at night.

From 1804 to 1819, the prison was used as a temporary naval hospital with 50 beds. After the 1806 Birgu polverista explosion, the government provided part of the prison as a store to the wine merchant Mr. Woodhouse, who had lost large quantities of wine in the disaster. In 1824 part of the building was demolished, to make way for a planned Protestant church which did not materialise, only to later be rebuilt. Later on in the 19th century, the building housed an elementary school, which was known as l-iskola tal-ħabs (school of the prison). It eventually became an examination hall before being closed down in 1940. The building was included on the Antiquities List of 1925. The prison was bombed in World War II, and the ruins were subsequently demolished. A large block of flats was built on its site in the 1950s.

== The building ==
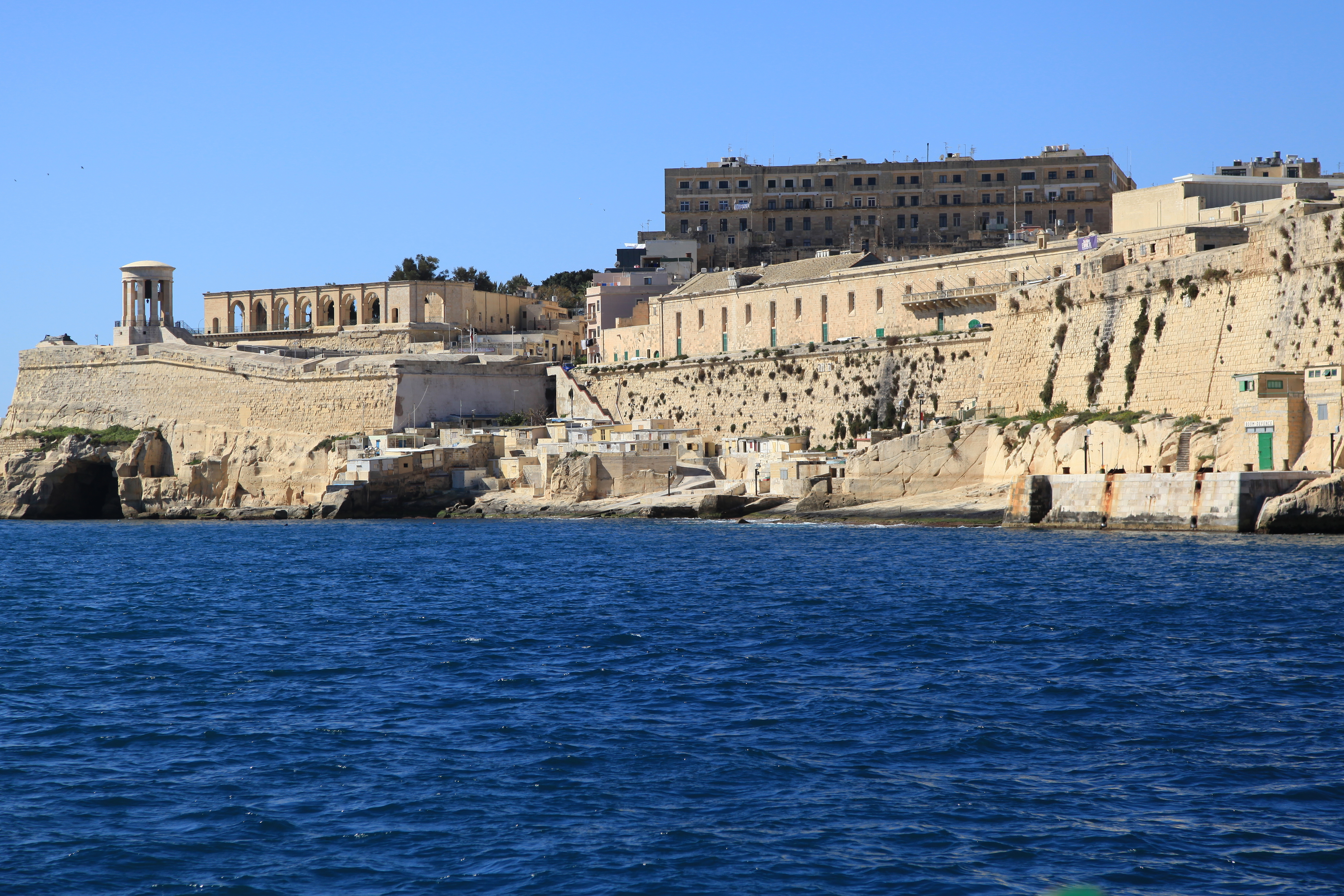
View of Valletta from the Grand Harbour. The Slaves' Prison stood on the site now occupied by the large block of flats.

The prison was a large three-story building occupying an entire city block close to the Lower Barrakka Gardens. A mid-19th century report describes it as:

a lofty quadrangular building, standing on the brow of a hill fronting the Grand Harbour. It is isolated, being bound by Strada St Ursula in front, the ramparts behind, Strade St Christophoro and Pozzi on either side. It consists of three stories, and occupies a nearby equilateral space about 400 paces in circumference.

Other slaves' prisons were located in Birgu and Senglea, and these were both demolished in the 20th century like the Valletta prison.

== Life in the prison ==
Courtyard of flats

Block of flats

The prison contained a tavern, from which slaves could buy food and drink, a mosque for Muslim slaves, and chapels dedicated to St. John the Baptist and the Holy Cross for Christian prisoners. Parts of the prison were accessible to the public, and some slaves operated barber shops and other establishments from within the prison.

A court case dated 1779 describes the situation within the prison as:

nobody could claim to have a friend, on the contrary, all are enemies of each other, and traitors each and every one.

The prison was run by a Prodomo, who served as the governor and was a knight of the Order of St. John. Agozzini had direct control over the prisoners, dividing them into work gangs for the galleys, while carcerieri were responsible for the register of prisoners and probably also acted as guards.
