= Republic Street, Valletta =

Street in Valletta, Malta

Republic Street
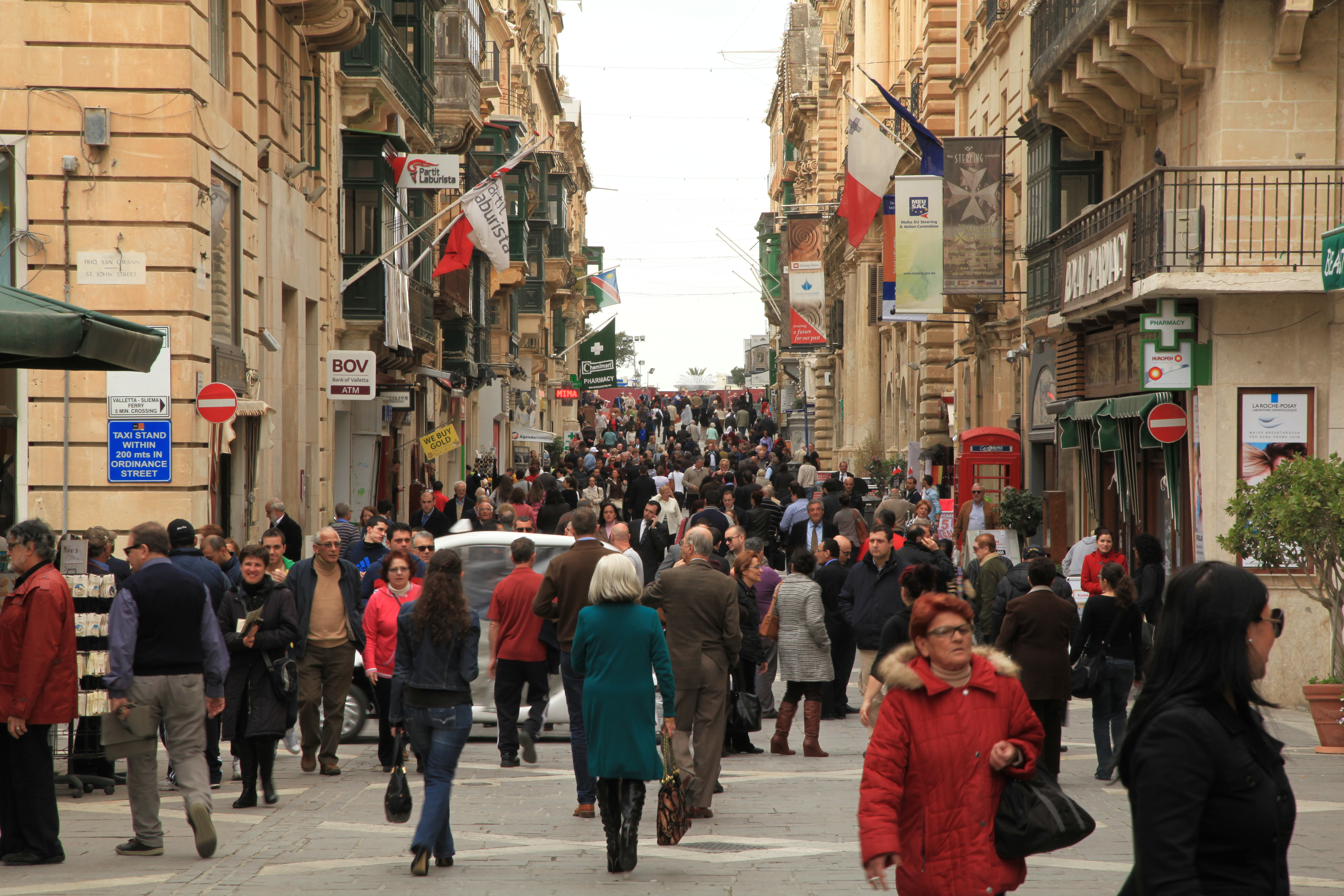
- Republic Street
- Interactive map of Republic Street
- Native name: Triq ir-Repubblika (Maltese)
- Former names: Rue Nationale; Strada Reale; Kingsway; Strada San Giorgio
- Maintained by: Transport Malta, Valletta Local Council
- Length: 1.0 km (0.62 mi)
- Location: Valletta, Malta
- Coordinates: 35.9000136°N 14.5131579°E

Other
- Known for: City Gate, Palazzo Ferreria, Parliament of Malta, Auberge de Provence, Courts of Justice, Grandmaster's Palace

Republic Street (Maltese: Triq ir-Repubblika), historically known as Strada Reale (Maltese: Strada Rjali) or Kingsway, is a principal street in the capital city of Valletta, Malta. It is about 1 kilometer long (0.6 miles) and is known for legislative, judiciary and commercial purposes. It is mostly pedestrianised.

Republic Street extends from City Gate towards the granaries at Fort St. Elmo. In its downward course the main street runs perpendicular with several other streets given Valletta's grid layout. It also encounters several buildings and squares of note, such as City Gate, Freedom Square, the Parliament of Malta, Palazzo Ferreria, Royal Opera House, the Archaeology Museum, St. John's Square, the Courts of Justice, the Casino Maltese, Republic Square, Grandmaster's Palace, St. George's Square, Spinola Palace, The Malta Chamber of Commerce, Enterprise and Industry, Casa Rocca Piccola and others.

The street is managed by the Valletta Local Council as well as the Maltese government, including waste management. The street is mostly dedicated to pedestrians, with highly limited vehicle use – only commercial vehicles loading and unloading in the early morning are allowed. This also applies to general maintenance vehicles. Only karozzini and electric cabs are allowed to drive up and down the street, while taxis can cross at intersections. The Malta Police Force uses Segways to patrol the streets.

== History ==
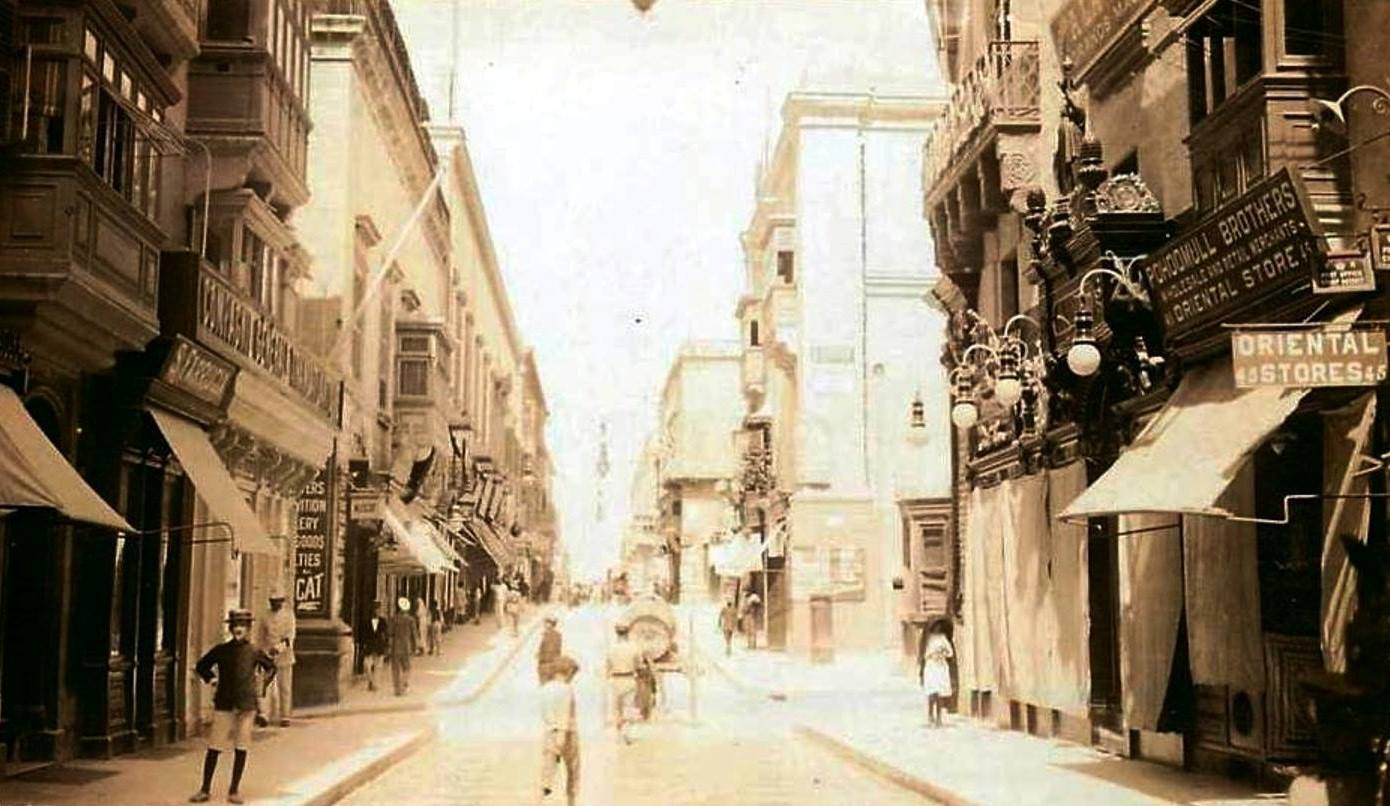
Kingsway, Valletta in the 1910s. Other interesting features include a little girl in a għonnella, a mobile barrel (water cart) douching the street is in the middle of the road, boaters on men, an officer wearing a light coloured uniform - possibly a policeman. On the right side, the Pohoomull Brothers' store offering 'Oriental textiles', set up in 1887; they were the predecessors of many other Indian Maltese families. The next shop toward St.Elmo is "A' La Ville de Londres". The shop windows are covered to protect the items from the sun.

After the Great Siege of Malta, Valletta was planned and built on a grid's layout by the Order of St. John, with Republic Street (back then, Strada San Giorgio) in the midst, to become the main street of the city.

The street has had several different names over the course of history. During the Order of St. John it was known Strada San Giorgio, during the French occupation of Malta it was named Rue Nationale, during the Crown Colony of Malta it was named Strada Reale; and during the period of the further Anglicisation of Malta under Prime Minister Sir Gerald Strickland, the street was named Kingsway in 1936. The Maltese renamed the street to its current name.

Republic Street was bombed heavily in World War II and suffered much damage like the rest of the region. This was due to its location in the heart of one of the most important cities in Malta.

In the contemporary day, Valletta is a hub of political, legislative, judiciary, commercial, business, retail and social reasons, such as fashion and music. It becomes busy during the Christmas period.

Original	Informal	French	British	British post-1926	Maltese
Strada San Giorgio	Strada delle Corse	Rue Nationale	Strada Reale	Kingsway	Triq ir-Repubblika

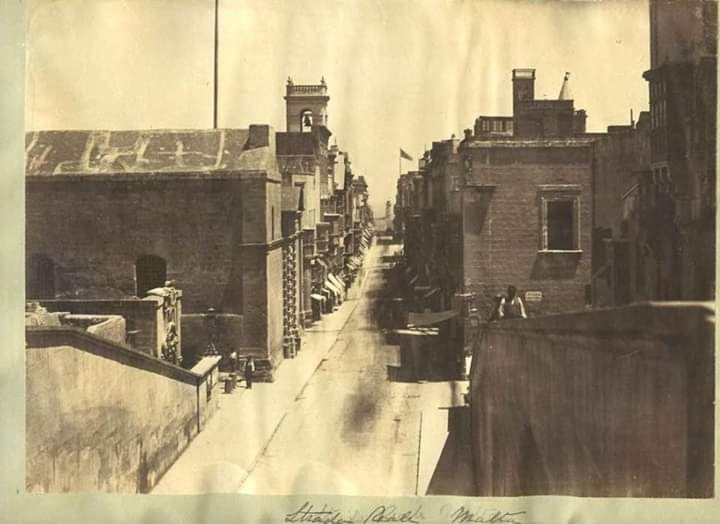
Strada Reale in 1859

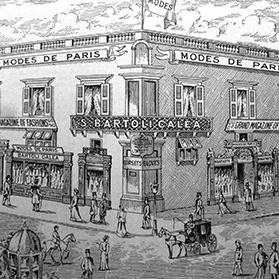
Bartoli Galea's establishment on Kingsway, 1880 (later A la ville de Londres)

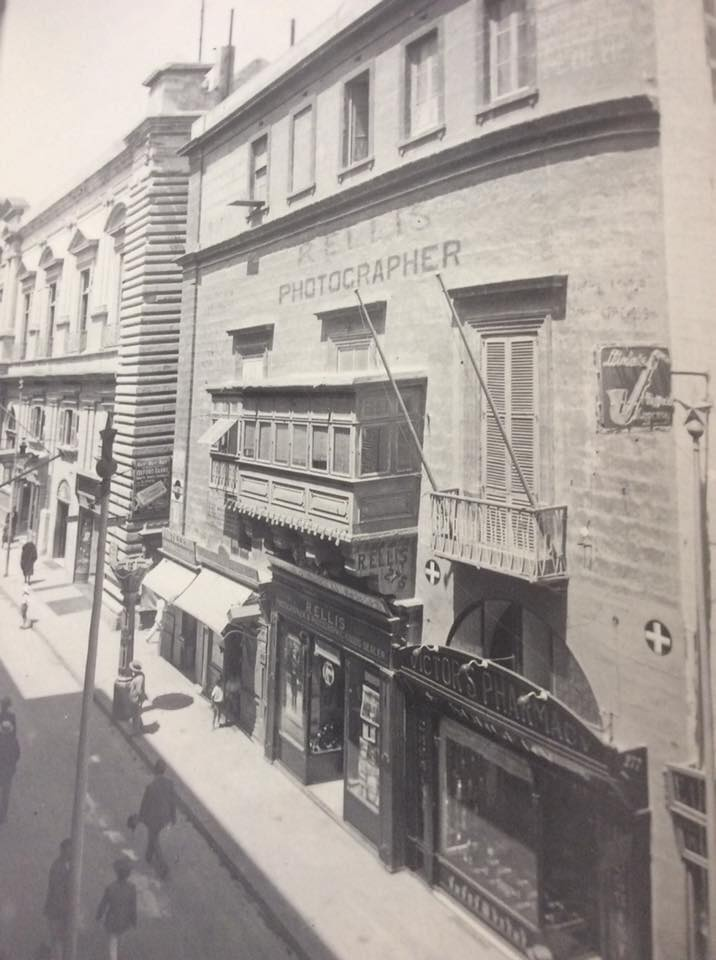
The Ellis photo studio on Kingsway, ca. 1900

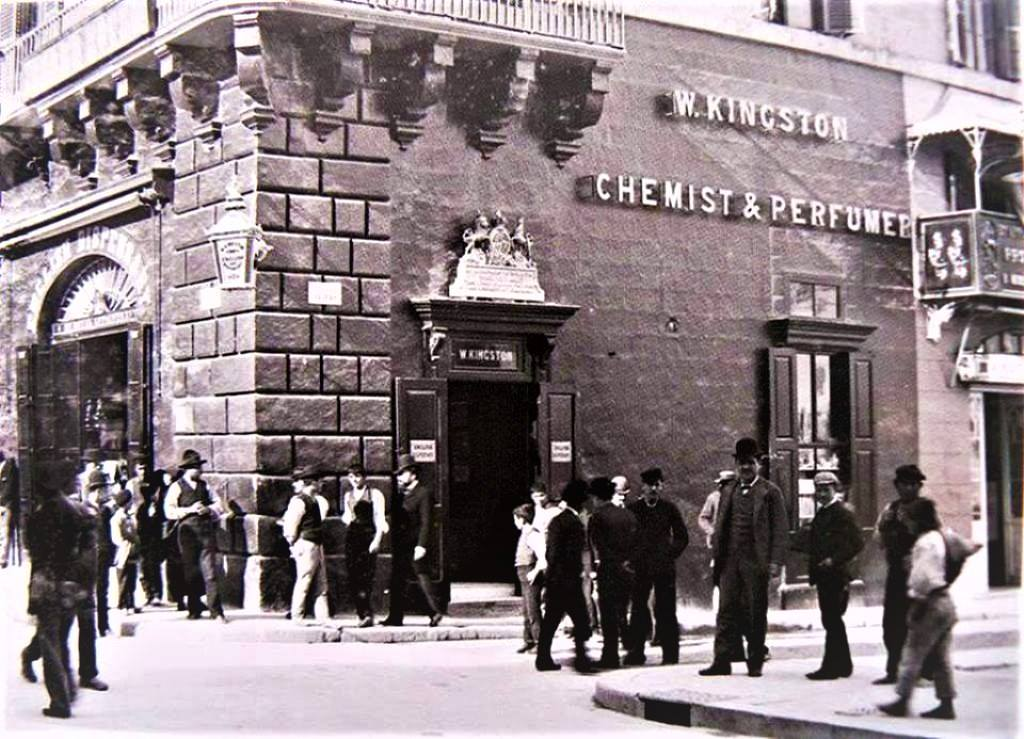
Kingston dispensary on Strada Reale, ca. 1900

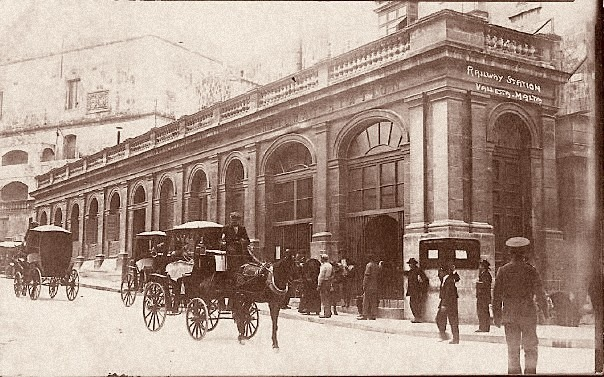
Old Valletta Railway Station on Kingsway, ca. 1900

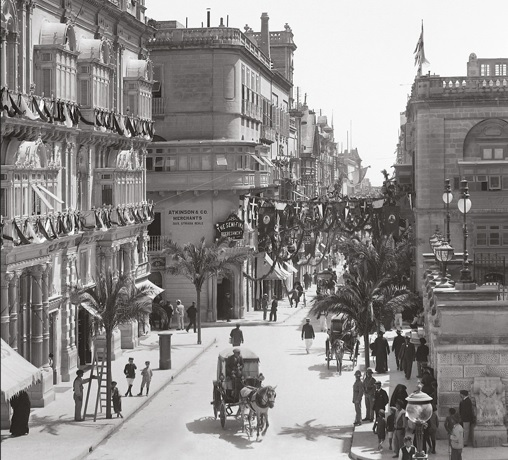
International Eucharistic Congress on Kingsway, 1913, by Richard Ellis

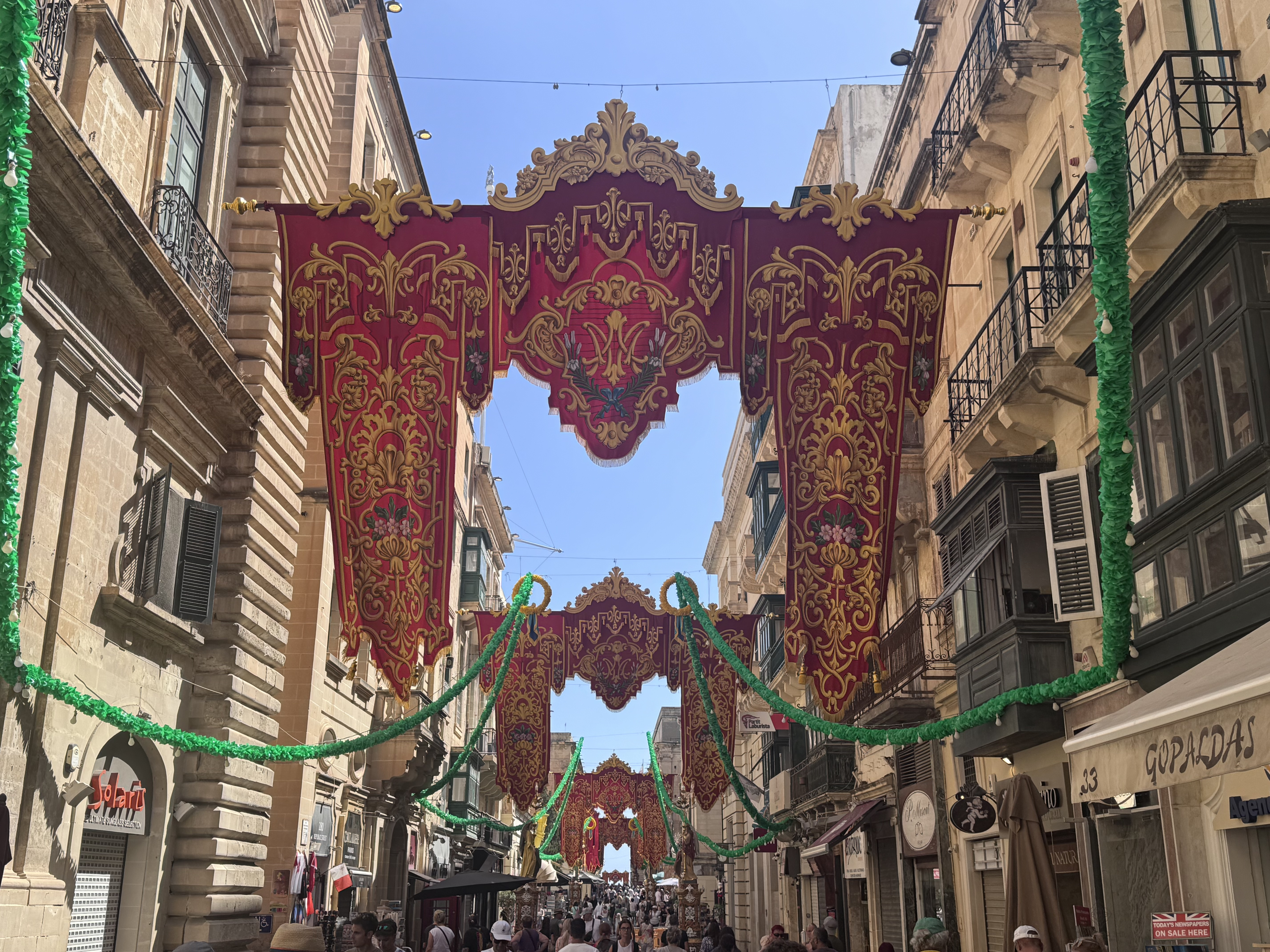
Festa banners in 2025

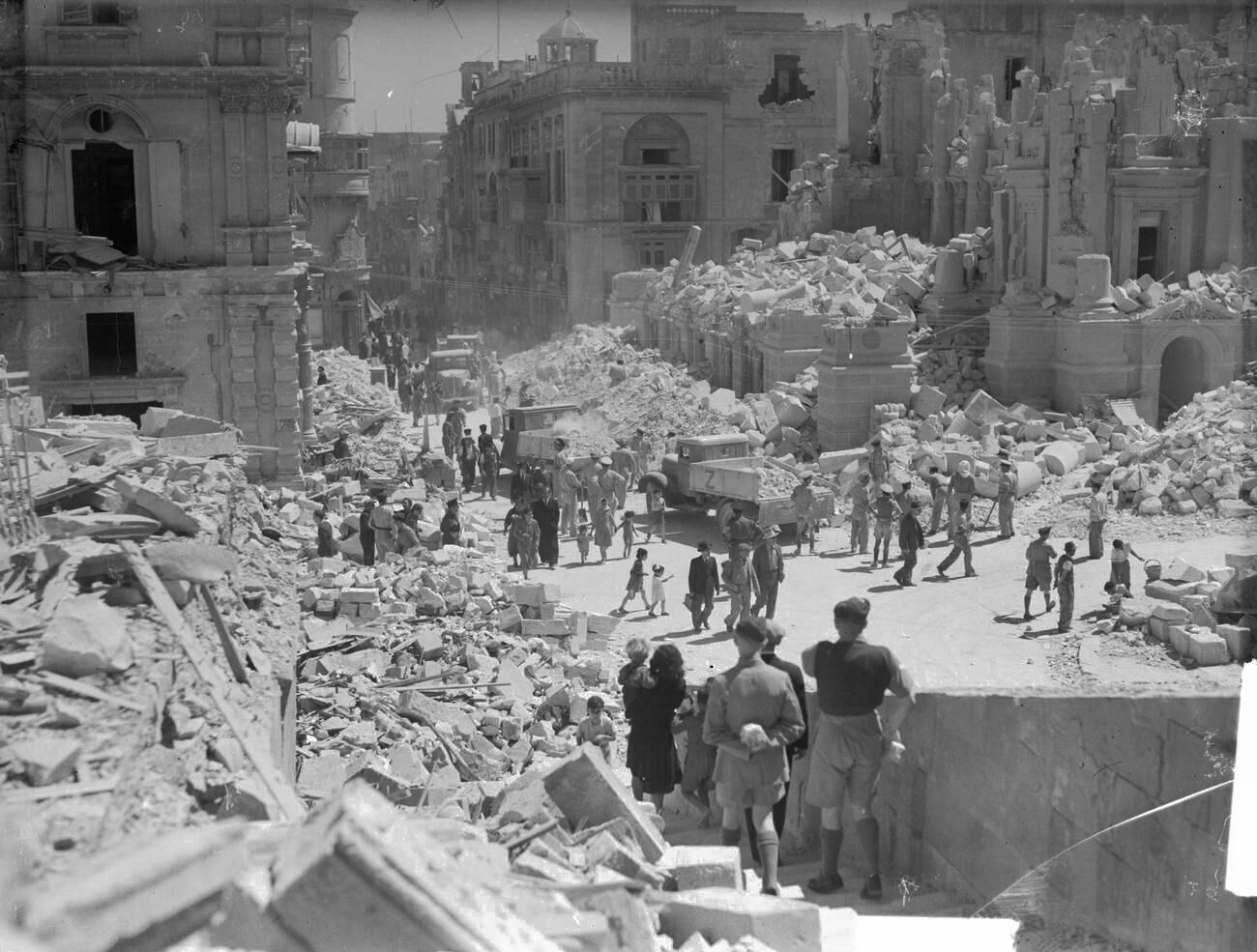
The heavily bomb-damaged Kingsway (now Republic Street) in Valletta during the siege of Malta, 1942

== See also ==
- Republic Square
- Valletta
- Malta
