= Giuseppe Bonavia =

Maltese architect and draughtsman (1821–1885)

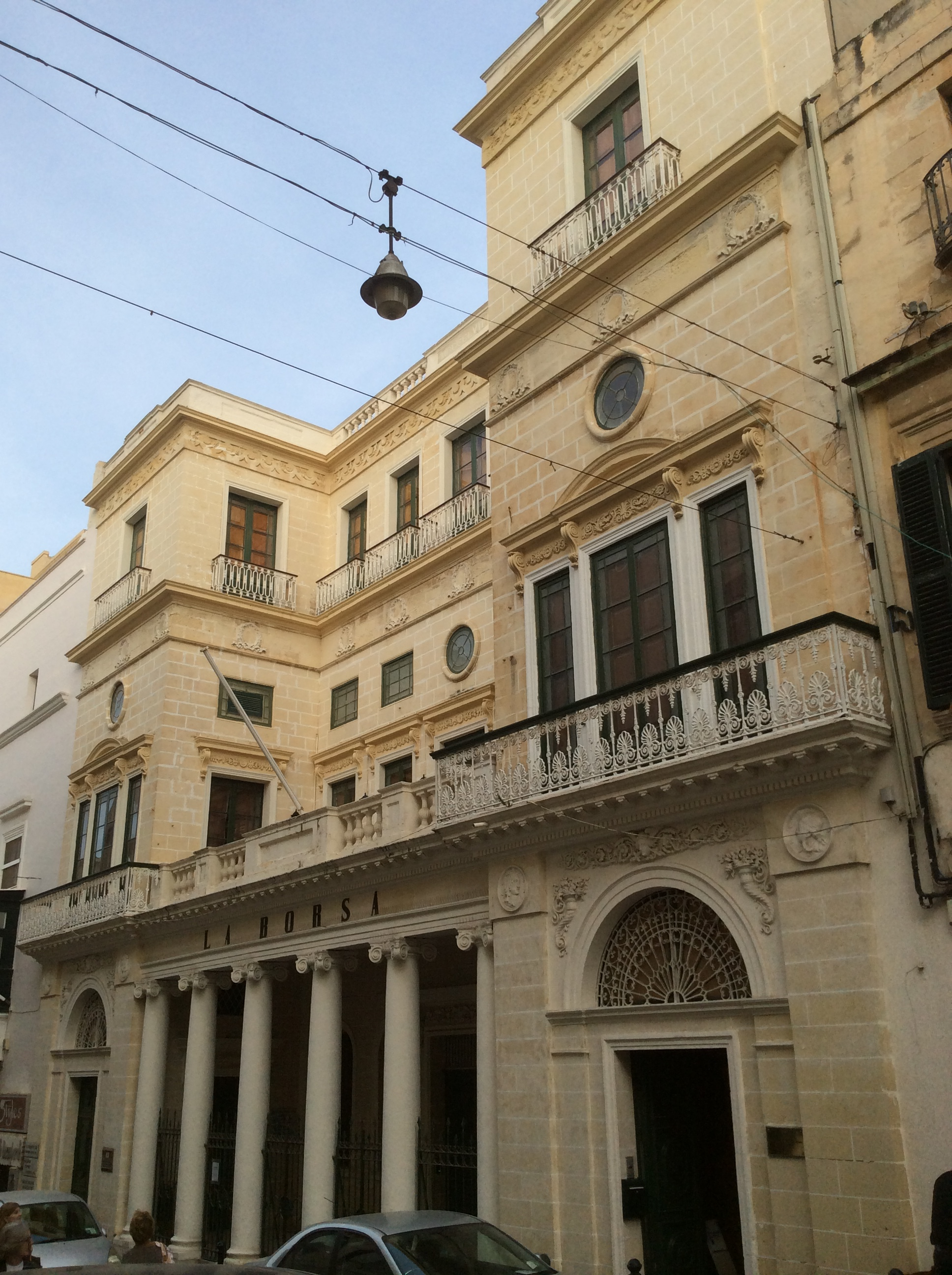
La Borsa in Valletta, one of Bonavia's best-known buildings

Giuseppe Bonavia (1821 – 2 September 1885) was a Maltese draughtsman and architect who was mainly active in the second half of the 19th century. Born in Valletta, he was initially a clerk of works with the Royal Engineers, before becoming the Head of the Civil Service Works Department.

Bonavia designed in a variety of styles, including Gothic Revival and Neoclassical architecture. His signature buildings were those of the 1850s and 1860s. His St. Andrew's Scots Church (1854) was the first Gothic church to be built in Malta, while his masterpiece is La Borsa (Exchange Buildings), which was built in 1857.

Buildings designed by Bonavia include:

- Façade of the Church of Our Lady of Mount Carmel, Valletta (1852)
- St. Paul's Church, Birkirkara (1852)
- The first Stella Maris Church, Sliema (1853)
- St. Andrew's Scots Church, Valletta (1854)
- First Carmelite Church, Balluta (1856)
- La Borsa, Valletta (1857)
- Lija Belvedere Tower (1857)
- Balluta Church (1859)
- Palazzo Ferreria, Valletta (1876)

Bonavia also made plans for the proposed Royal Opera House in 1859, but eventually the building was constructed to designs of the English architect Edward Middleton Barry. The Dragonara Palace in St. Julian's is sometimes also attributed to Bonavia.
