= Charlene Vella =

Art historian

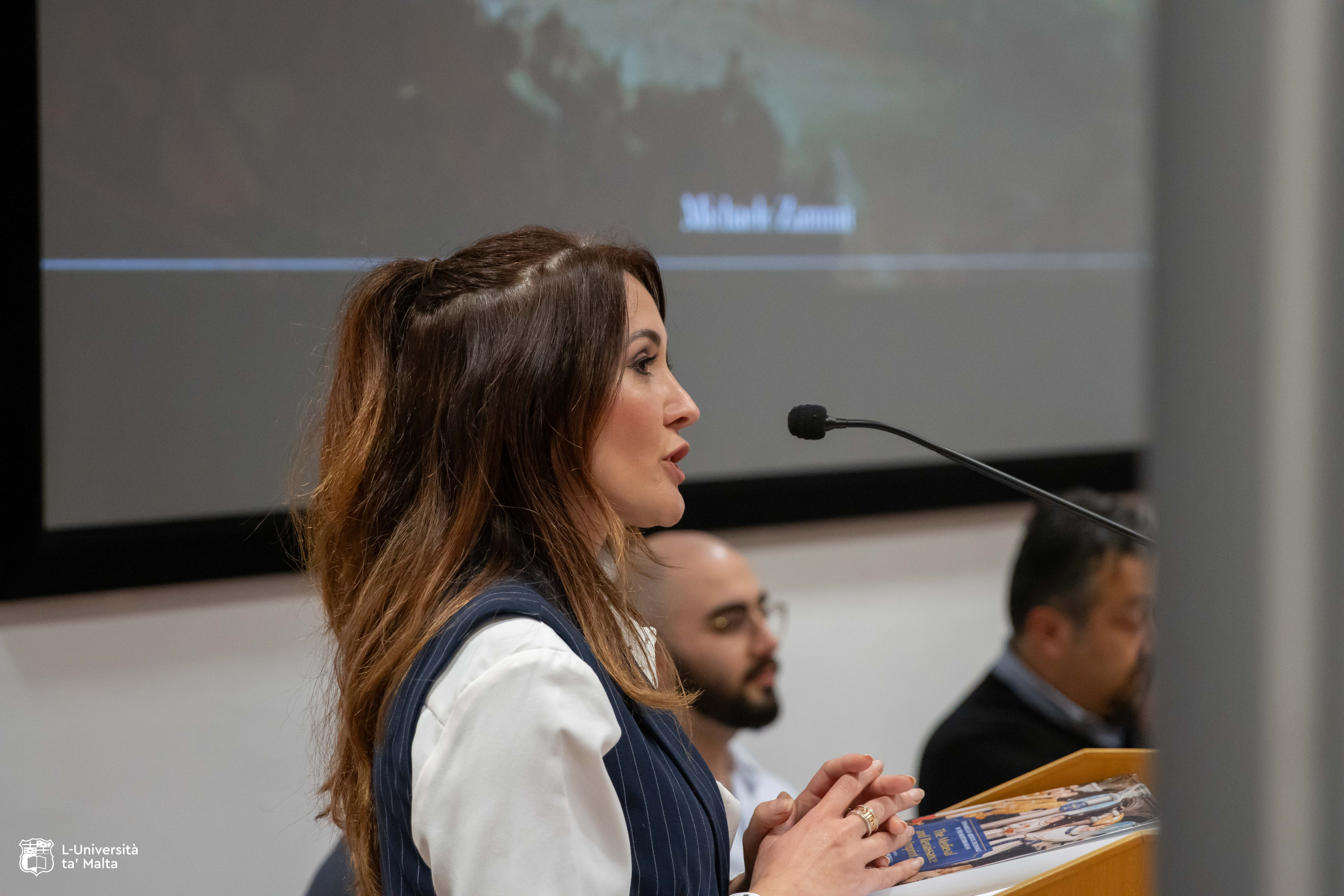
Charlene Vella at the University of Malta Valletta Campus in February 2024

Charlene Vella is an associate professor, Maltese art historian, academic, and author with focus on medieval and classical art. Vella leads research on Late Medieval and Classical art at the University of Malta.

== Biography ==
Charlene Vella studied art history at the University of Malta, and in 2016 she obtained PhD degree from University of Warwick. At University of Warwick Vella studied under Donal Cooper from the University of Cambridge. On 7 March 2025, Vella was honoured at the Mara event, which serves as a platform to celebrate female leadership, creativity, and resilience in Malta. Vella was recognised as the first female full-time lecturer in Art History at the University of Malta and the first female to be promoted to associate professor in the same field.

Vella is the author of two monographs and has published several papers in local and international journals. In 2023 Vella received the ‘Premio Antonello da Messina 2023’ for the section ‘Studi Antonelliani’ organised by the Associazione Culturale “Antonello da Messina” held on 14 April 2023 at the Basilica di S. Marco in Capitoline Hill in Rome. Vella has also organised international conferences regarding medieval art at the University of Malta.

Since 2016 Vella has been a member of the Malta Planning Authority's Design Advisory Committee. In 2023 Vella was selected as a Member of the Board of the Malta Catholic Institute. Between 2008 and 2018 Vella was resident art critic for Sunday Times of Malta. She also currently serves on the scientific committee of academic journal Studi Storici Siciliani: Trimestrale di Storia della Sicilia Moderna e Contemporanea, and is a member of the board of the Notarial Archives Foundation, Valletta. Charlene Vella is also a Trustee of the Alfred Chircop Trust and secretary of the Voluntary Organisation Association of St Mary of Jesus, Franciscan Friars, Rabat, Malta.

== Publications ==
- The Mediterranean Artistic Context of Late Medieval Malta: 1091-1530, Charlene Vella. Malta: Midsea Books, 2013.
- In the Footsteps of Antonello Da Messina: The Antonelliani between Sicily and Venice. Charlene Vella. Malta: Midsea Books, 2022.
- Dynamics of Artistic Exchange in the Mediterranean: the Medieval and Renaissance Imprint. Charlene Vella (ed.). Malta: Midsea Books, 2024.
- With Abigail Pace, ‘Isabelle Borg: an Artist who happened to be a Woman’, in Yosanne Vella (ed.) Discovering women’s history in Malta, 2024, Malta University Press, pp. 143–151.
- ‘New insights into the painted crucifix attributed to Antonio de Saliba in the V&A Museum, London’, The Antiquaries Journal, 101, 2021, pp. 269–300. doi:10.1017/S000358152000030X.
