= Republic street =

Republic street or Republic Street may also refer to:

- Republic Street, Valletta, street in Valletta, Malta
- Republic street, street in Victoria, Gozo, Malta
- Rue de la République, street in Lyon, France
