= Parliament House (Malta) =

Meeting place of the Parliament of Malta

- Il-Parlament
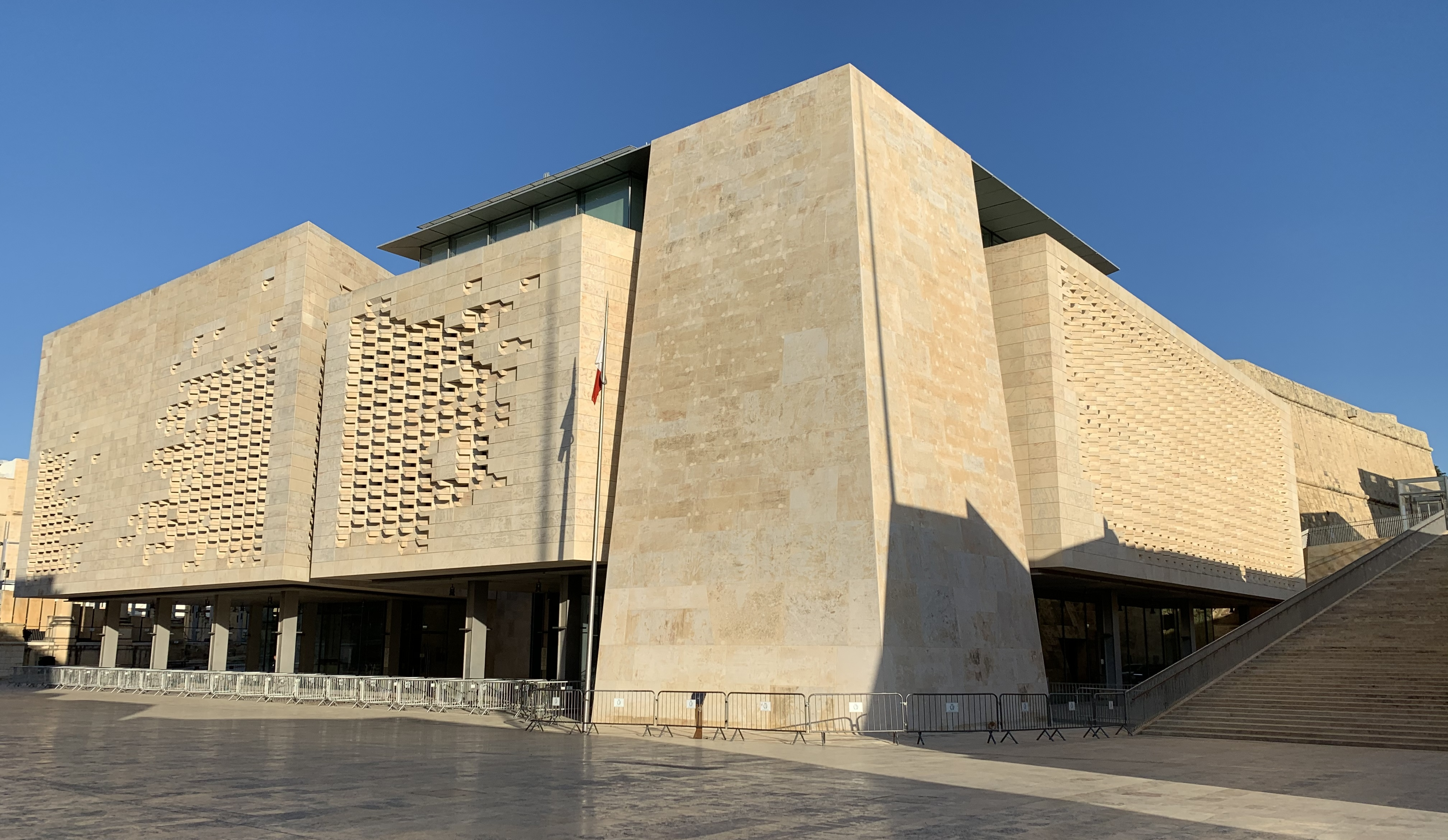
- Parliament House looking southeast

- Location within Malta
- Alternative names: New Parliament Building, Il-Parlament il-Ġdid

General information
- Status: Completed
- Type: Legislative building
- Location: Valletta, Malta
- Coordinates: 35°53′46″N 14°30′35″E
- Construction started: 2011
- Inaugurated: 4 May 2015; 10 years ago
- Cost: €90 million
- Client: Grand Harbour Regeneration Corporation
- Owner: Government of Malta

Technical details
- Material: Limestone, concrete and steel
- Floor count: 3
- Floor area: 23,000 m^{2} (250,000 sq ft)

Design and construction
- Architect: Renzo Piano
- Architecture firm: Renzo Piano Building Workshop

The Parliament House (Maltese: Dar il-Parlament) is the meeting place of the Parliament of Malta located in Valletta, Malta. The building was constructed between 2011 and 2015 to designs by Renzo Piano as part of the City Gate Project, which also included building a new City Gate and converting the ruins of the Royal Opera House into an open-air theatre. Construction of the Parliament House generated considerable controversy, mainly due to the modern design of the building and the cost of construction, which amounted to around €90 million.

From 1921 to 1976, the meeting place of the Parliament of Malta had been the Tapestry Chamber of the Grandmaster's Palace, also in Valletta. In 1976, the former armoury of the same palace was converted into a new parliament, and meetings were held there until the opening of the purpose-built Parliament House on 4 May 2015.

== Site ==
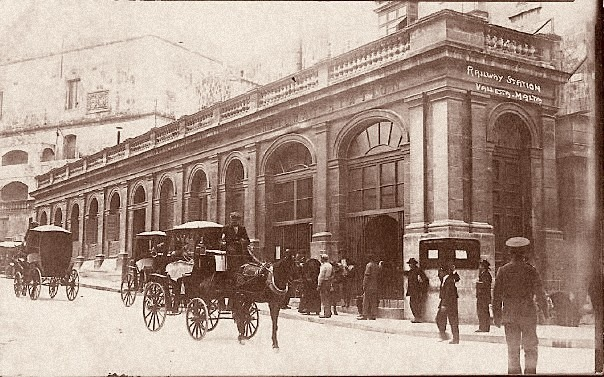
Old Valletta Railway Station (Reception), 1880s

The Parliament House is located in Republic Street near City Gate, the entrance to Valletta. The building is located adjacent to Saint James Cavalier and the ruins of the Royal Opera House, and opposite the City Gate Shopping Arcade and Palazzo Ferreria.

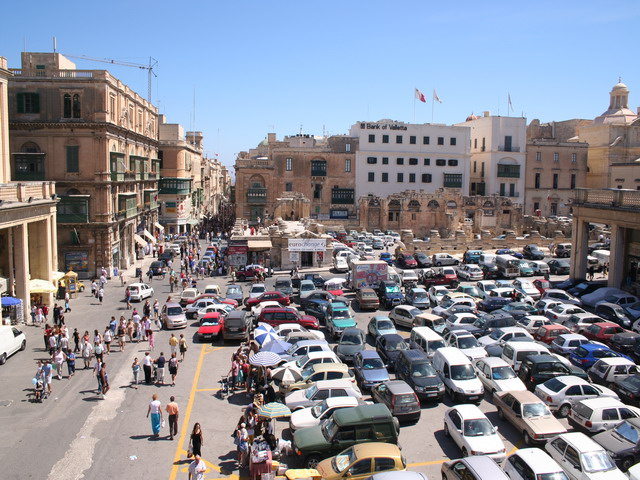
Freedom Square in 2005

The site presently occupied by the Parliament House originally contained houses, and later the Valletta Station of the Malta Railway. The area was bombarded during World War II, and the station and surrounding buildings were demolished in the 1960s as part of a project to redevelop the entrance to Valletta. The area was converted into an open space known as Freedom Square (Maltese: Misraħ il-Ħelsien), which was surrounded by a shopping arcade. The square was originally rather plain, and was commonly used as a car park.

Though most of the square has been built-up, part of it is still officially the Freedom Square, and is now in a rectangular form. The square now covers from the corner of Palazzo Ferreria to the first column across of the subjected parliament, and to the Spanish steps next to the City Gate.

== Design and construction ==
=== Planning ===
The building of the Parliament House was a part of the City Gate Project, which was meant to redevelop the entrance of Valletta. The project consisted of the demolition of the fourth City Gate and the Freedom Square Arcade and the construction of the fifth City Gate and the Parliament House. In addition, the ruins of the Royal Opera House were converted into an open-air theatre known as Pjazza Teatru Rjal. The City Gate project was designed by the Italian architect Renzo Piano, and the plans were revealed on 27 June 2009. The Grand Harbour Regeneration Corporation paid Piano €6.6 million for his work on the project.

=== Construction ===
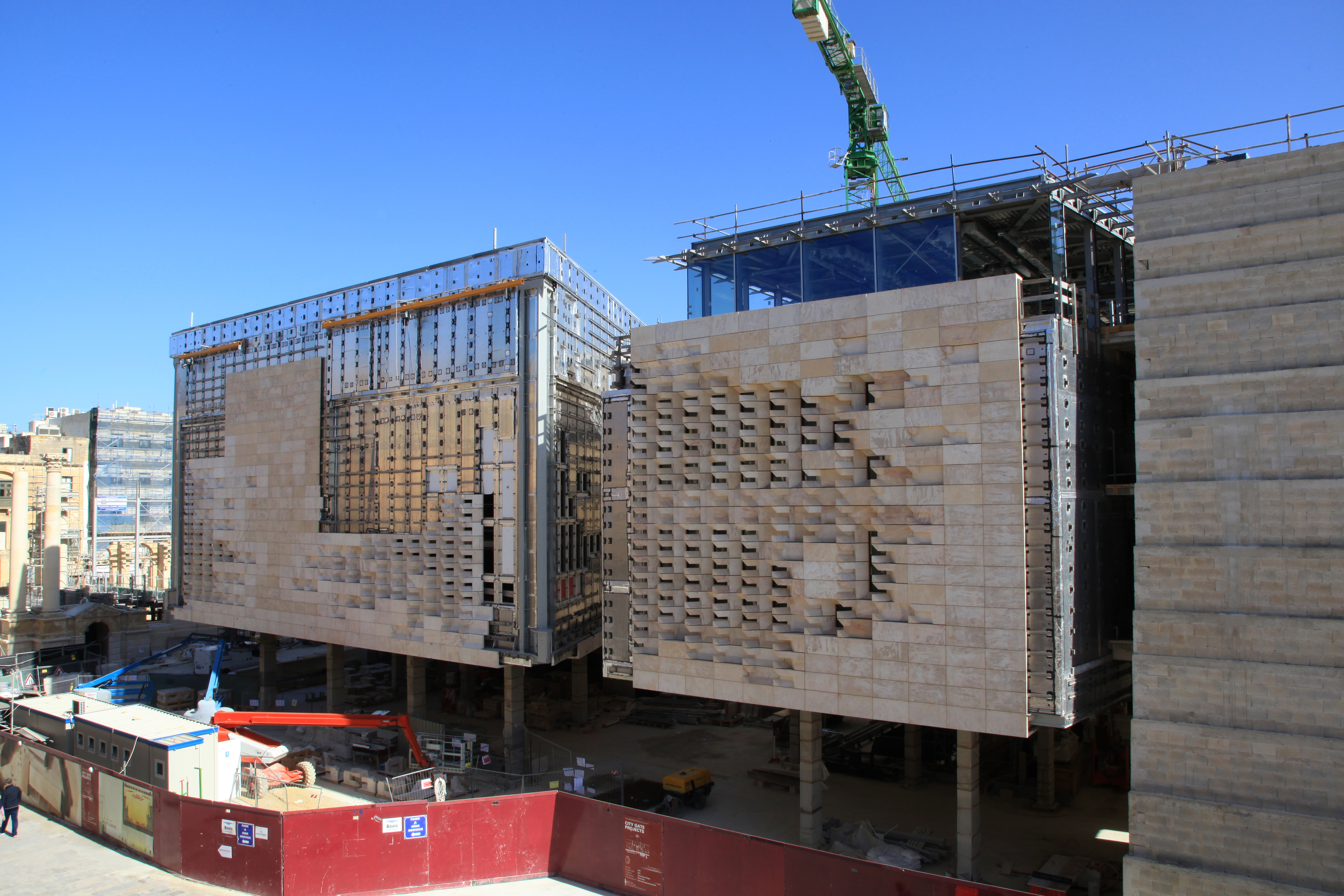
Parliament House under construction, in 2013, with both the steel frame and limestone facade visible

The demolition of the arcades of Freedom Square began in October 2010. Excavation works for the foundations of the Parliament House began soon after demolition was complete. In early 2011, the original plan was modified with the relocation of a staircase, the extension of one of the blocks, and changes in the design of the louvers on the facade. Construction started later that year, and the steel frame of the structure was complete by early 2012. At this point, it began to be covered in limestone which had been quarried in Gozo, and cut into specific shapes in Italy, before being sent back to Malta. Between 120 and 150 workers were on the construction site every day, and it cost more than €90 million to build.

The completion date of the project was originally given as November 2012 or early 2013. The estimated completion date was extended to September 2013, and later to September 2014. Contractors failed to meet deadlines, and the building was still not complete by the end of 2014. It was eventually completed in 2015.

=== Inauguration ===
The Parliament House was officially inaugurated by President Marie Louise Coleiro Preca on 4 May 2015. Members of Parliament and other guests gathered at the old chamber at the Grandmaster's Palace, and walked to the new building accompanied by the police force band. Coleiro Preca called the inauguration of the Parliament House "a milestone in Malta's parliamentary history", since this is the first purpose-built parliament building in Malta. The first sitting was held later the same day.

Most of the building is closed to visitors for security reasons, but a permanent exhibition on the ground floor is open to the public.

On 1 August 2015, Piano visited the Parliament House for the first time since its inauguration.

=== Critical reception ===
The building of the Parliament House, along with the rest of the City Gate project, was controversial. Critics considered it an unnecessary project, proposing to restore Fort Saint Elmo or one of the large dilapidated palaces in the city and converting it into a parliament building, for a fraction of the cost of constructing a new building. Some argued that the square should not have been built up as it was one of the few open spaces in Valletta. Others attacked the modern design of the structure itself, including the Labour MP Carmelo Abela, who called the Parliament House "an ugly building built on stilts".

The building's design, particularly the system of cladding, was compared to a dovecote (Maltese: Barumbara tal-ħamiem) or to a cheese grater by the general public. The cladding were intended to actually represent honeycombs as the name of Malta derives from Melite which means honey. The ultramodern design that contrasts much with the rest of Valletta has gone as far as the UNESCO questioning the city's title as a World Heritage Site. In 2015, the building was included on The Daily Telegraph's list of "the world's best (and worst) new buildings", although the newspaper did not state in which category the building fell.

== Structure ==
The Parliament House consists of two blocks connected together with bridges, one of which houses the chamber of parliament. The two blocks are separate so as not to obscure views of Saint James Cavalier from Republic Street. Each block has three floors. The structure consists of a steel frame clad in Gozitan limestone. The stone slabs are carved in such a way that they seem to have been eroded by nature.

Parliament House is a zero emission building since heat energy is recovered from or given off to the mass of rock below. This is used to heat and cool the building, avoiding any cooling towers or boilers.
