= Palazzo Ferreria =

Palace in Valletta, Malta

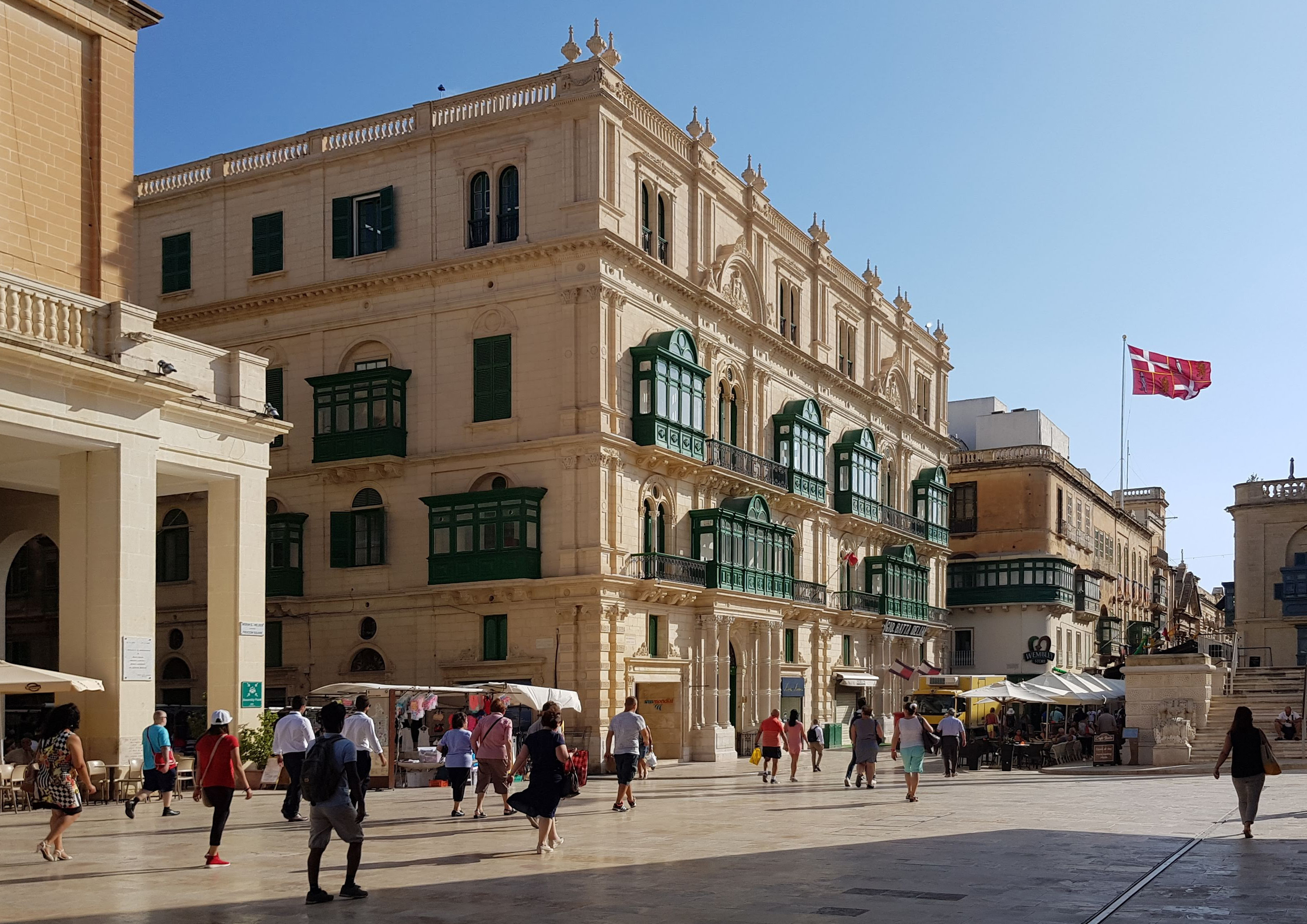
- Palazzo Ferreria in 2019
- Interactive map of the Palazzo Ferreria area
- Former names: Palazzo Francia

General information
- Status: Intact
- Type: Palace
- Architectural style: Venetian Gothic
- Location: Valletta, Malta
- Coordinates: 35°53′48.6″N 14°30′36″E
- Named for: John Louis Francia
- Completed: 1876
- Owner: Government of Malta

Technical details
- Material: Limestone

Design and construction
- Architect: Giuseppe Bonavia

Palazzo Ferreria, officially Palazzo Buttiġieġ-Francia, is a palace found near the entrance of Valletta, the capital city of Malta. It was built in the late 19th century. Designed by architect Giuseppe Bonavia, it makes use of an interesting concept of adding local timber balconies to a design inspired from that of buildings in Italy. It is protected as a Grade 2 national monument.

== History ==
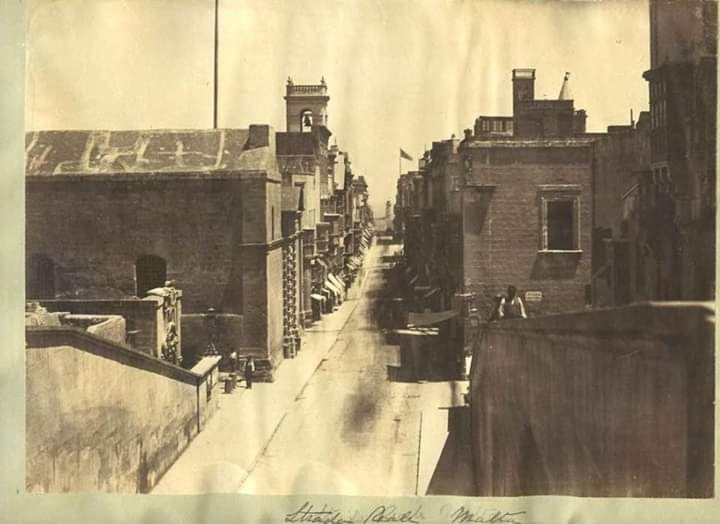
The Order's foundry (left) which stood on the site of Palazzo Ferreria, as it stood in 1859

On the plot of the palace a former foundry of the Order of St John existed to manufacture the knights' armaments. Giuseppe Buttigieg and his wife Giovanna Camilleri acquired the land from the government, and they built Palazzo Ferreria in the late 19th century. Visibly on the façade are the coat of arms of Buttiegieg and Camilleri. The palace was left as dowry to their daughter Teresa Buttigieg. She married Colonel John Louis Francia for whom the Palace got its name for a while. Francia was a Spanish citizen from the British colony Gibraltar, and the two met in Malta while Francia was on duty with the British army. Palazzo Ferreria is the second biggest palace in Valletta after the Grandmaster's Palace.

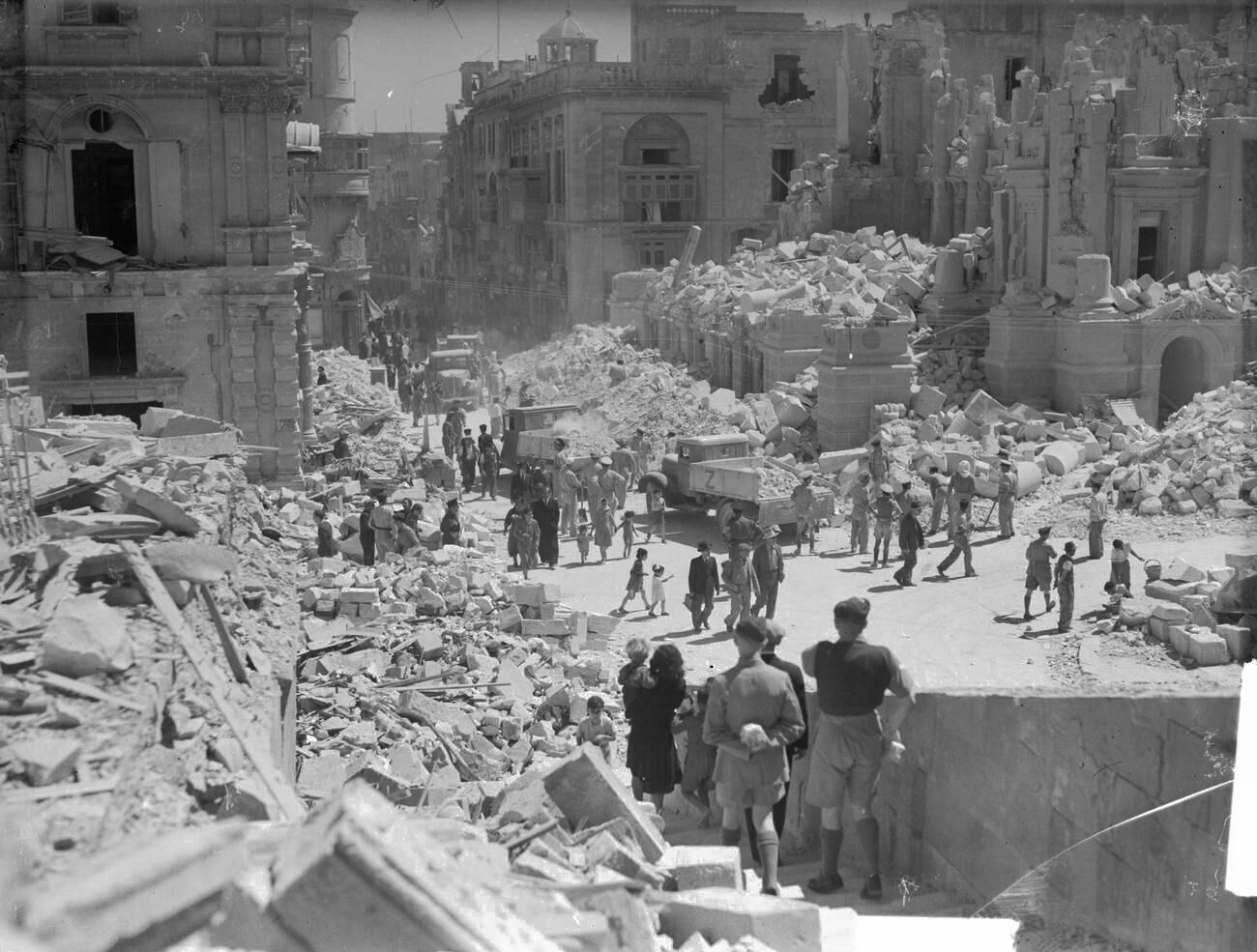
During World War II several buildings in Valletta suffered structural damage including minimal damage to Palazzo Ferreria on the left

The Francia family resided at the palace until the end of World War Two, in 1947. The war had destroyed or partly damaged most buildings in Valletta. The Labour government, led by Dom Mintoff, rented part of the palace from the Francia for the Public Works Department, to reconstruct and restore Valletta from the war damage. The family kept a small part of the palace as an apartment which is now used as a Maltese government Ministry's office. The Francia sold the palace in 1979 to the government which was administered once again under Prime Minister of Malta Dom Mintoff. Today the lower parts of the palace consist of several shops.

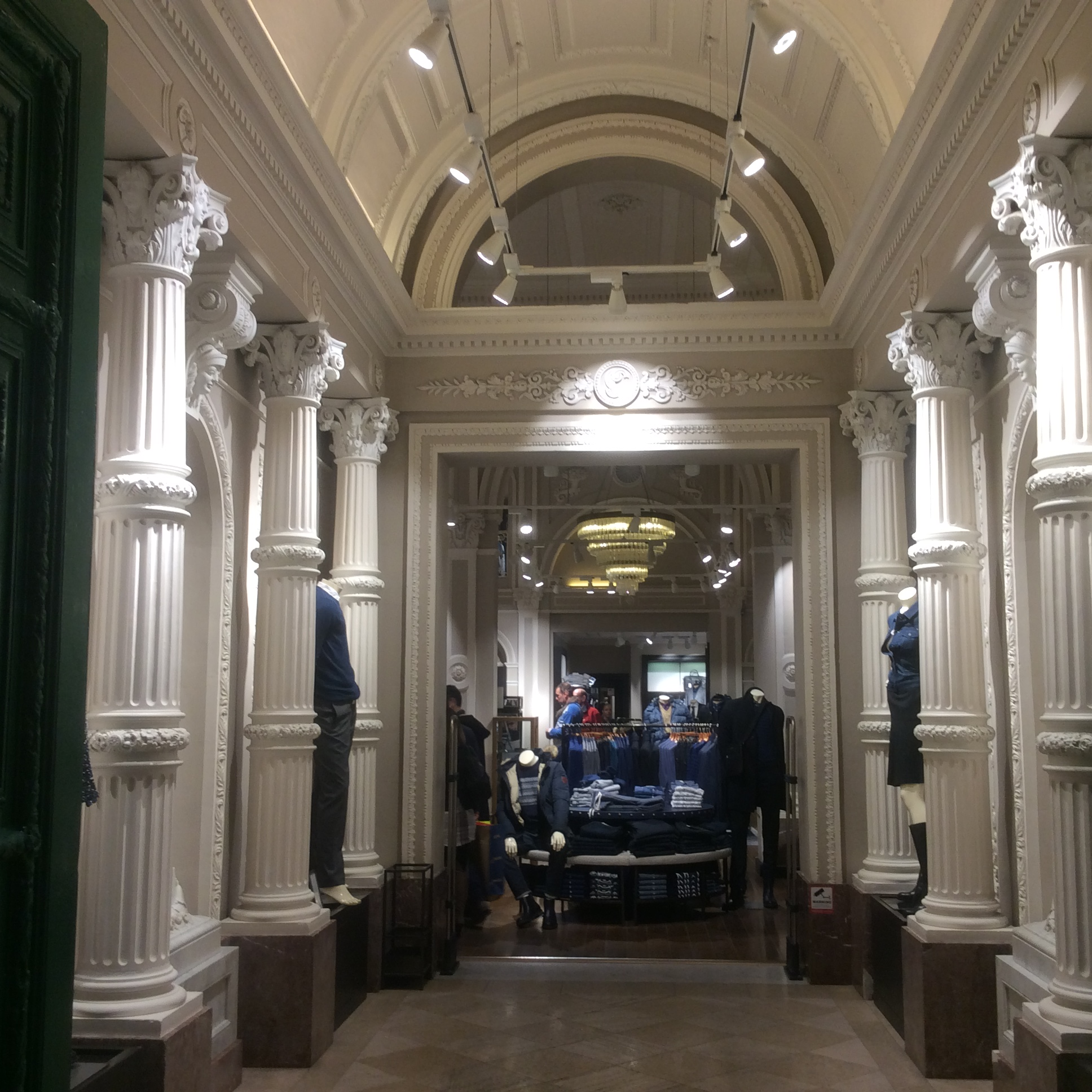
One of the entrances of Palazzo Ferreria, now a clothes shop.

The palace was restored in 2017.

== Architecture ==
The architect of Palazzo Ferreria is Giuseppe Bonavia, who also designed the Lija Belvedere Tower and La Borsa. The palace is scheduled as a grade 2 national monument by the Malta Environment and Planning Authority (MEPA). Bonavia wanted to develop this site after losing the bid to become the architect of the Royal Opera House (opposite) and to show what he was capable of building and what could have resulted had his design been chosen over that of Edward Middleton Barry.

== Gallery ==
Interior of Palazzo Ferreria
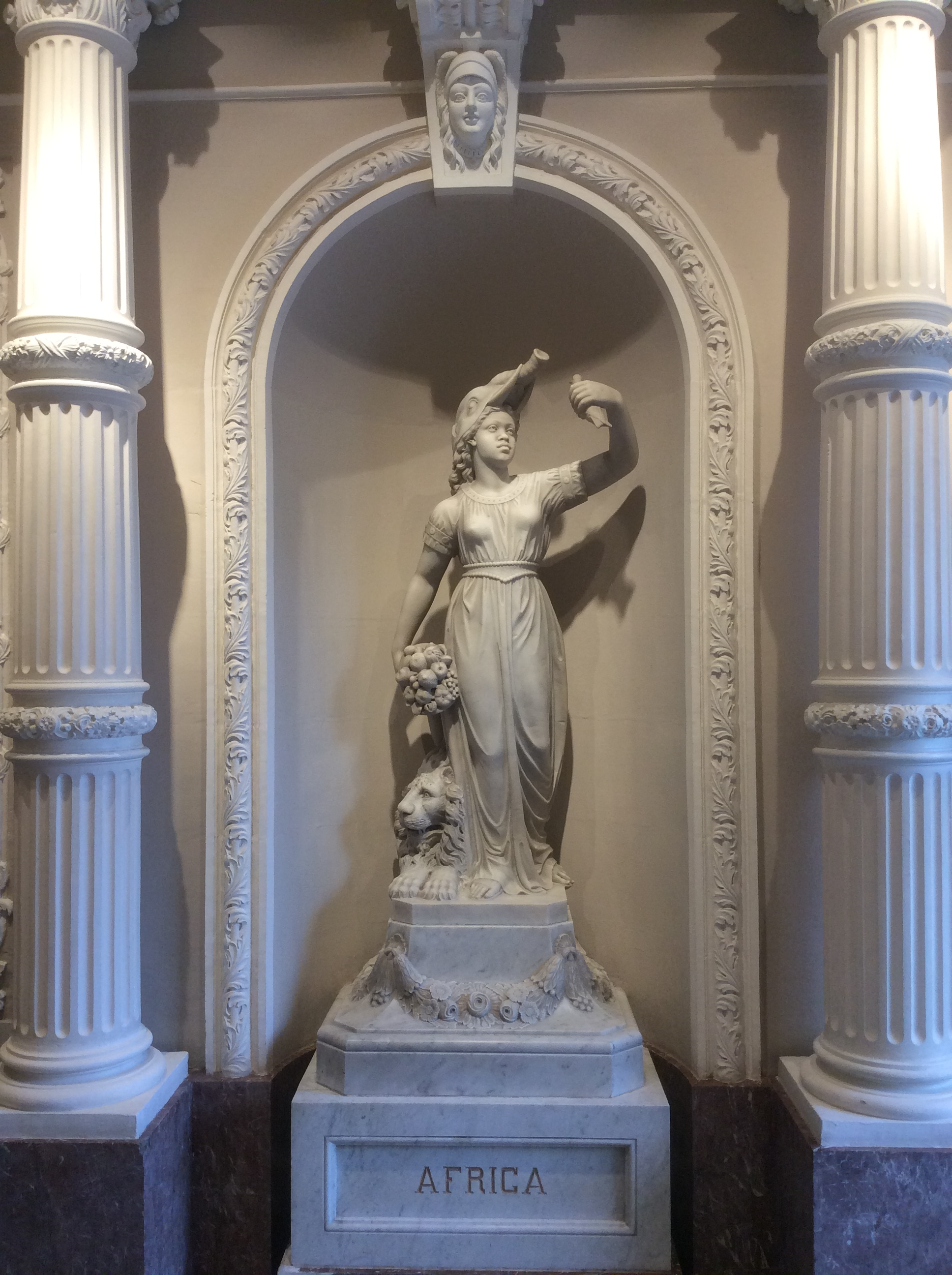
Statue representing Africa

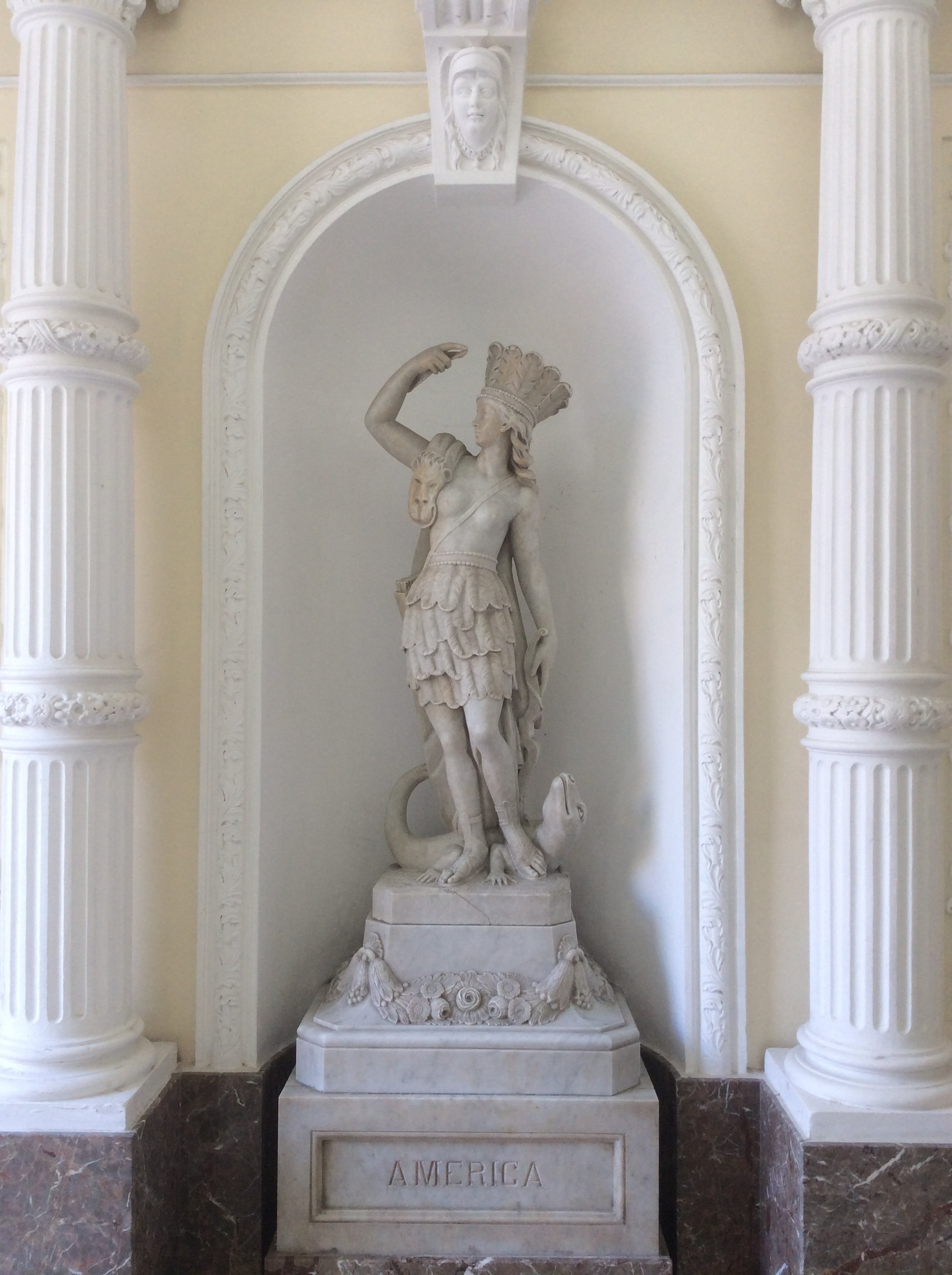
Statue representing the Americas

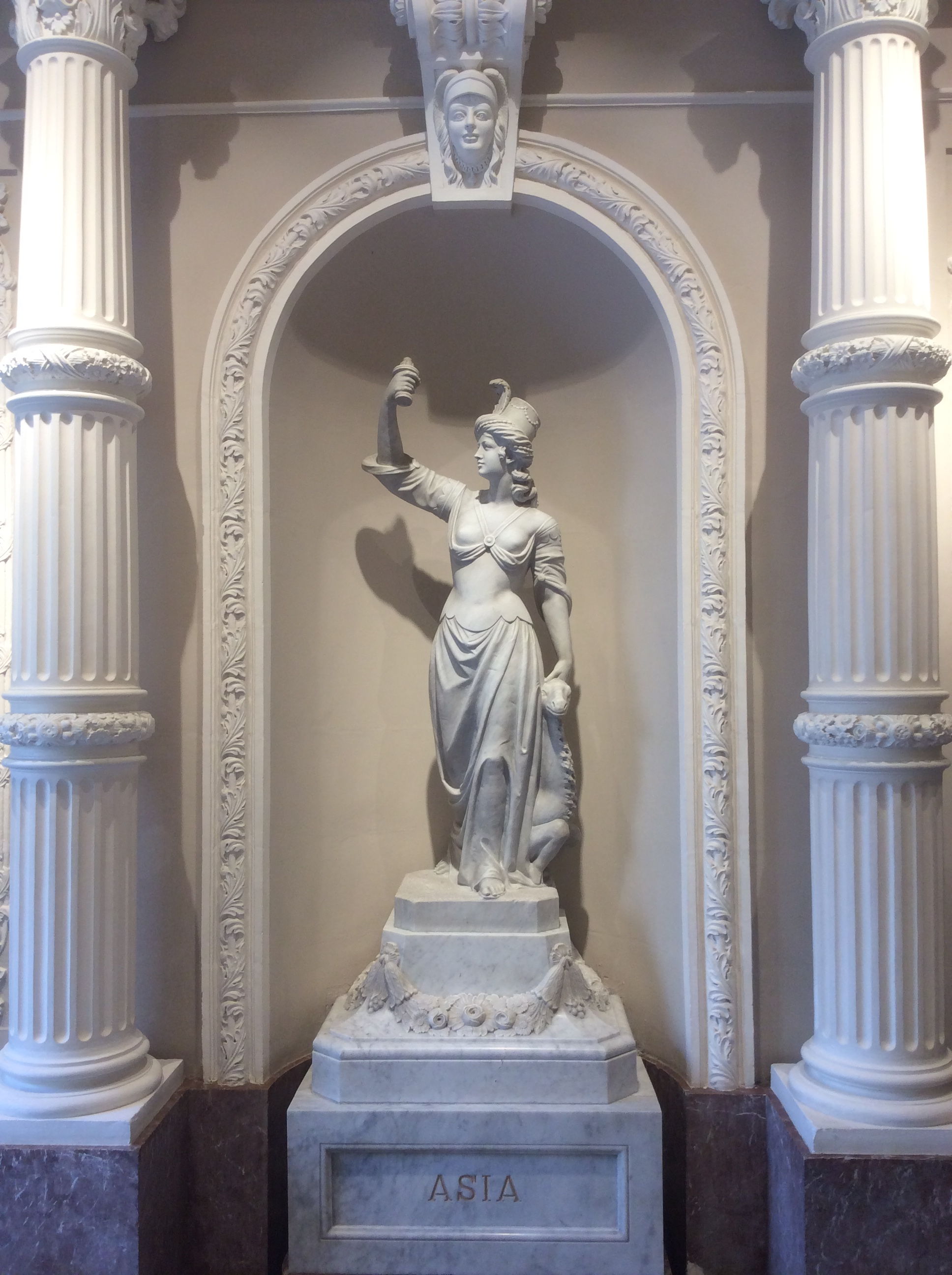
Statue representing Asia

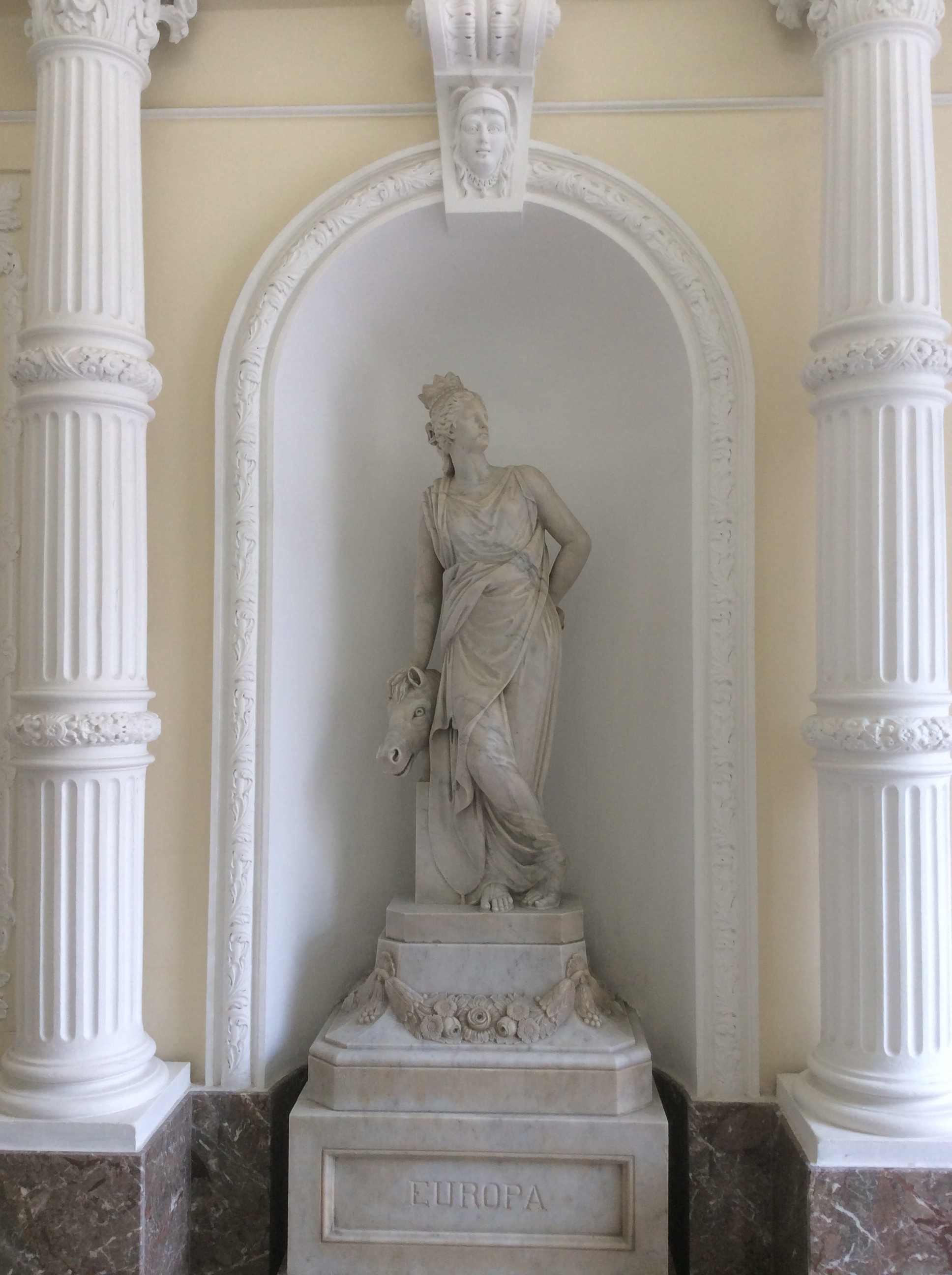
Statue representing Europa
