= Lija =

Lija Ħal Lija Casal Lia
- Local council
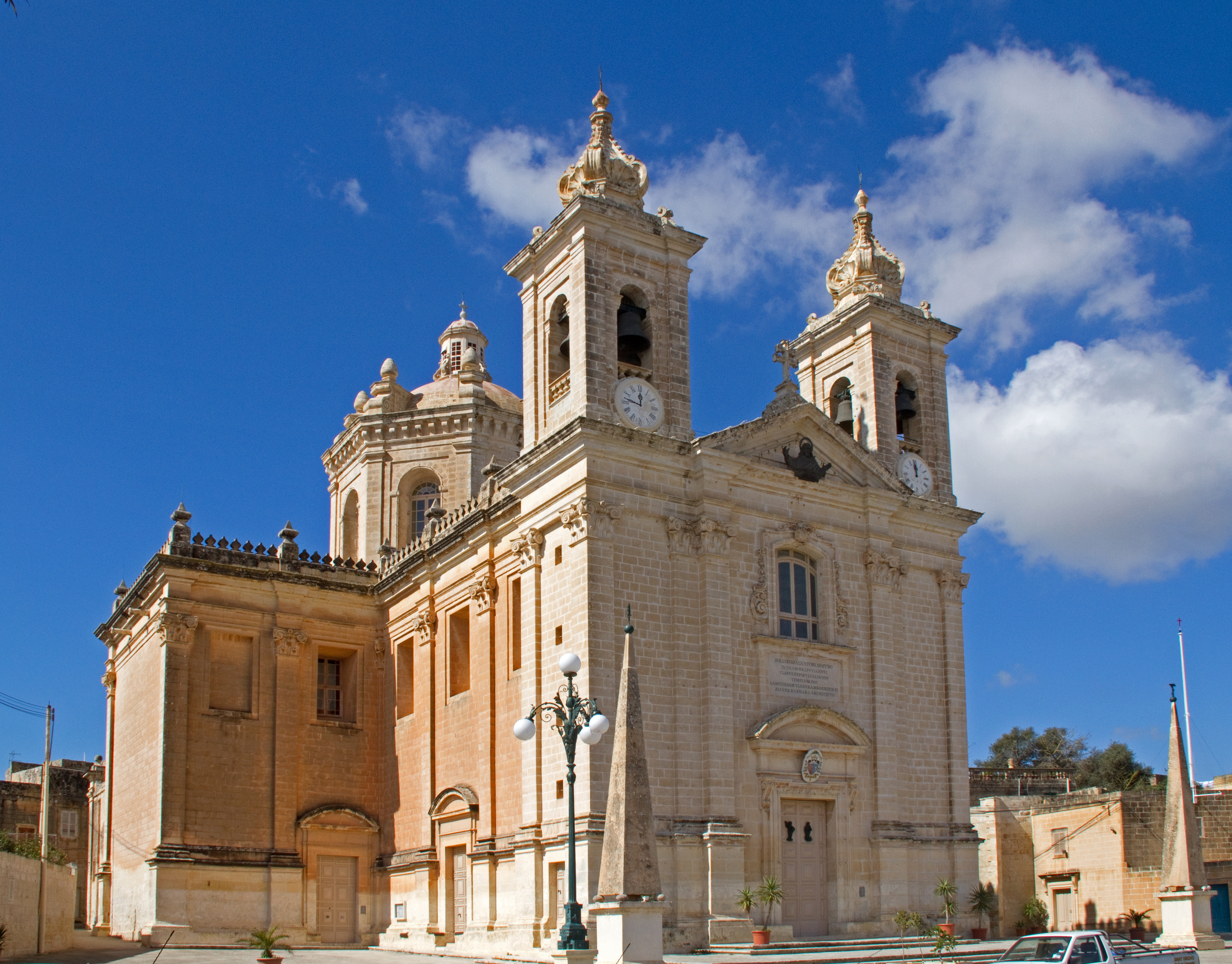
- Lija Parish Church

- Flag Coat of arms
- Motto(s): Suavi Fructo Rubeo (I glow red with sweet fruit)
- Coordinates: 35°54′5″N 14°26′50″E
- Country: Malta
- Region: Eastern Region
- District: Western District
- Borders: Attard, Balzan, Birkirkara, Iklin, Mosta, Naxxar

Government
  - Mayor: Anthony Dalli (PN)

Area
  - Total: 1.1 km^{2} (0.42 sq mi)

Population (Jul. 2024)
  - Total: 3,785
  - Density: 3,400/km^{2} (8,800/sq mi)
- Demonym(s): Lijan (m), Lijana (f), Lijani (pl)
- Time zone: UTC+01:00 (CET)
  - Summer (DST): UTC+02:00 (CEST)
- Postal code: LJA
- Dialing code: 356
- ISO 3166 code: MT-24
- Patron saint: Transfiguration of Our Saviour
- Day of festa: 6 August
- Website: Official website

Lija (Maltese: Ħal Lija) is a small village in the Eastern Region of Malta. Together with Attard and Balzan, it forms part of Malta's "Three Villages" (Maltese: It-Tliet Irħula). Lija has a baroque parish church and seven other small chapels. The parish church is dedicated to Our Saviour. Lija became a parish in 1594, after the small community detached itself from the neighbouring town, Birkirkara. The population of Lija was 3,785 in July 2024. This included 2,098 males and 1,687 females; 2,901 Maltese nationals and 884 foreign nationals.

== Culture ==
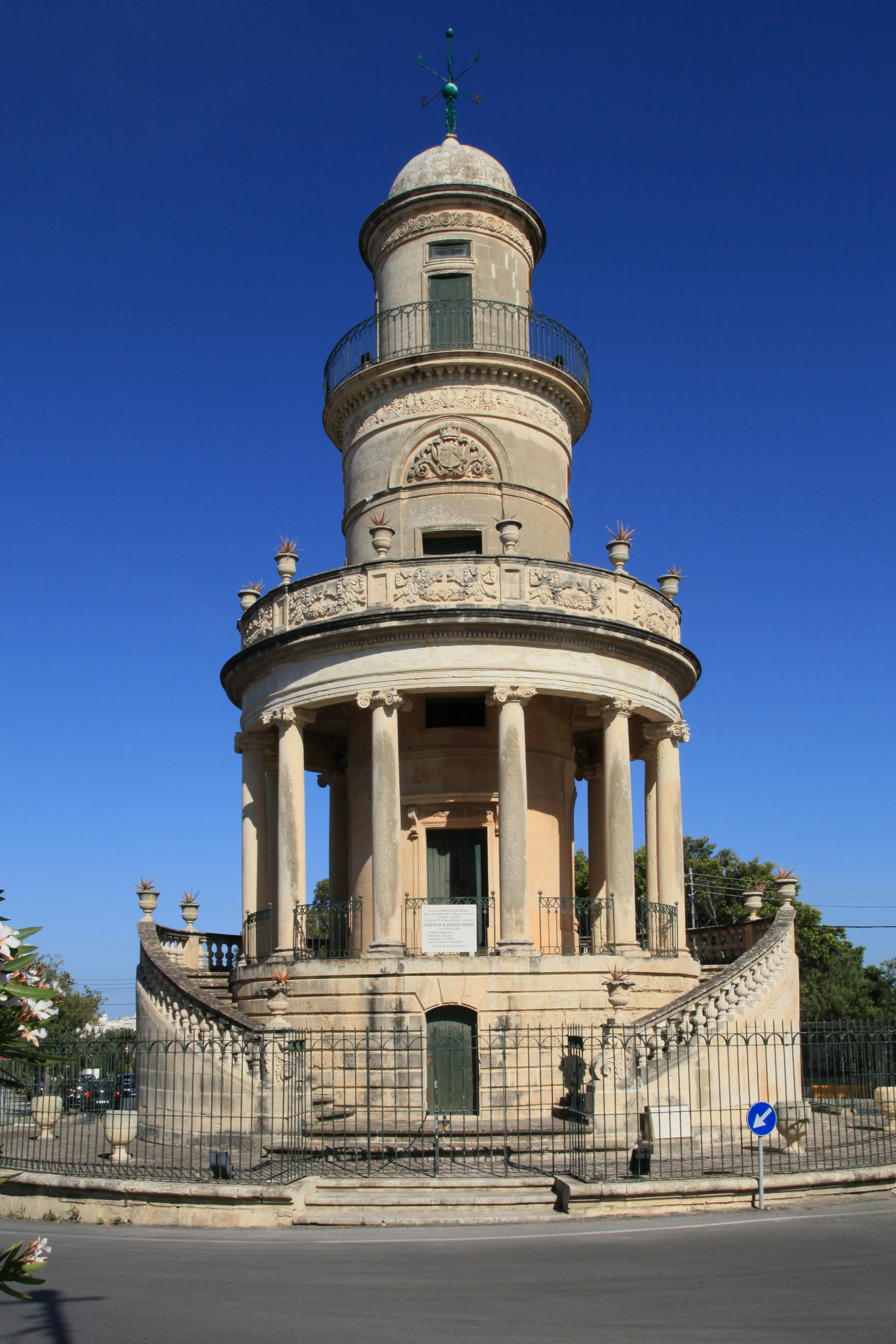
Lija Belveder

Lija is mostly known for its fireworks displays that attract thousands of locals and tourists during the festa period held in the first week of August. These displays are well renowned and claimed to be the best around the island. The Lija fireworks team also won an international fireworks competition held in Monaco back in 1980. In 2006, the Lija fireworks factory placed second in a Fireworks festival organised at the Grand Harbour in Malta's capital, Valletta.

Lija has several old houses and large citrus gardens. The Lija Belvedere Tower and Villa Francia are the main attraction. The official University Residence of the University of Malta was also situated in this village and was still running until 2020. .

British author Anthony Burgess, whose works include A Clockwork Orange, resided in Lija for three years (1968-1970). At Lija there is also Villa Parisio, where politician Mabel Strickland, daughter of Lord Gerald Strickland, lived.

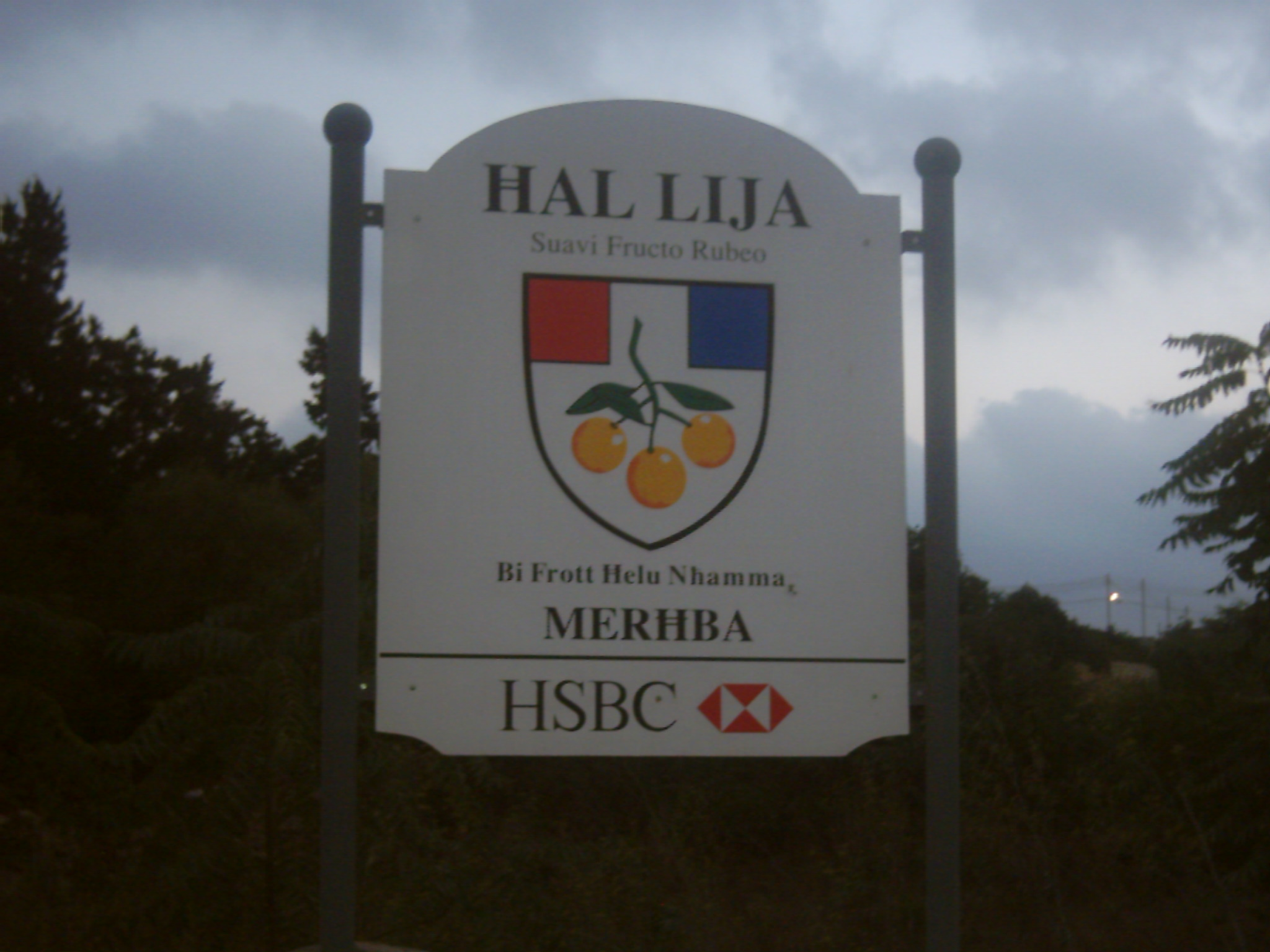
Entering Lija

== Government ==
It has the head office of Transport Malta.

== Sports ==
=== Football Club ===
Lija Athletic F.C. is the village's football club. This club has been promoted to Malta's Premier (highest) Division five times in its history, most recently in the 2020/21 season. Considering the small size of the village and the resource and financial limitations, this was deemed to be a huge success by local sports enthusiasts. Lija Athletic, with the collaboration of the Local Council, inaugurated a new synthetic pitch on 6 July 2007 (Jum Ħal Lija or "Lija Day"). This pitch is situated in the village's primary school grounds. During the year 2024, the club celebrated its 75th anniversary since its foundation in 1949, although this was not one of triumph, ending the 2024/25 season relegated to the National Amateur League 1.

=== Youth Football Academy ===
The local football club Lija Athletic F.C. also incorporates the Lija Iklin Football Academy. It was founded back in 2002 by then president Mr Charles J.Scerri, alongside the Iklin Local Council and the 'Skema Żgħażagħ Iklin'. During the years the academy has been recognized as one of central Malta's leading football academy's with over 250 players registered. The academy includes teams in each age category, catering for boys and girls.

=== Bocci Club ===
The Lija Bocci Club has been operating since the 1980s and has won various honours in the local scene. Currently they compete in the 1st Division of the Premier Category while also competing in the Reserves category. The Club operates and has its facilities in the Ġnien Ċentru Rikreattiv in Lija.

=== Other Sports ===
The village of Lija also incorporates a state-of-the-art Padel Court and a Tennis Court, both located in Ġnien Ċentru Rikreattiv in the heart of Lija.
