= St Andrew's Scots Church, Malta =

St Andrew's Scots Church
- Saint Andrew's Scots Church, A Union of the Church of Scotland and the Methodist Church of England, South East District
- Saint Andrew's International Church
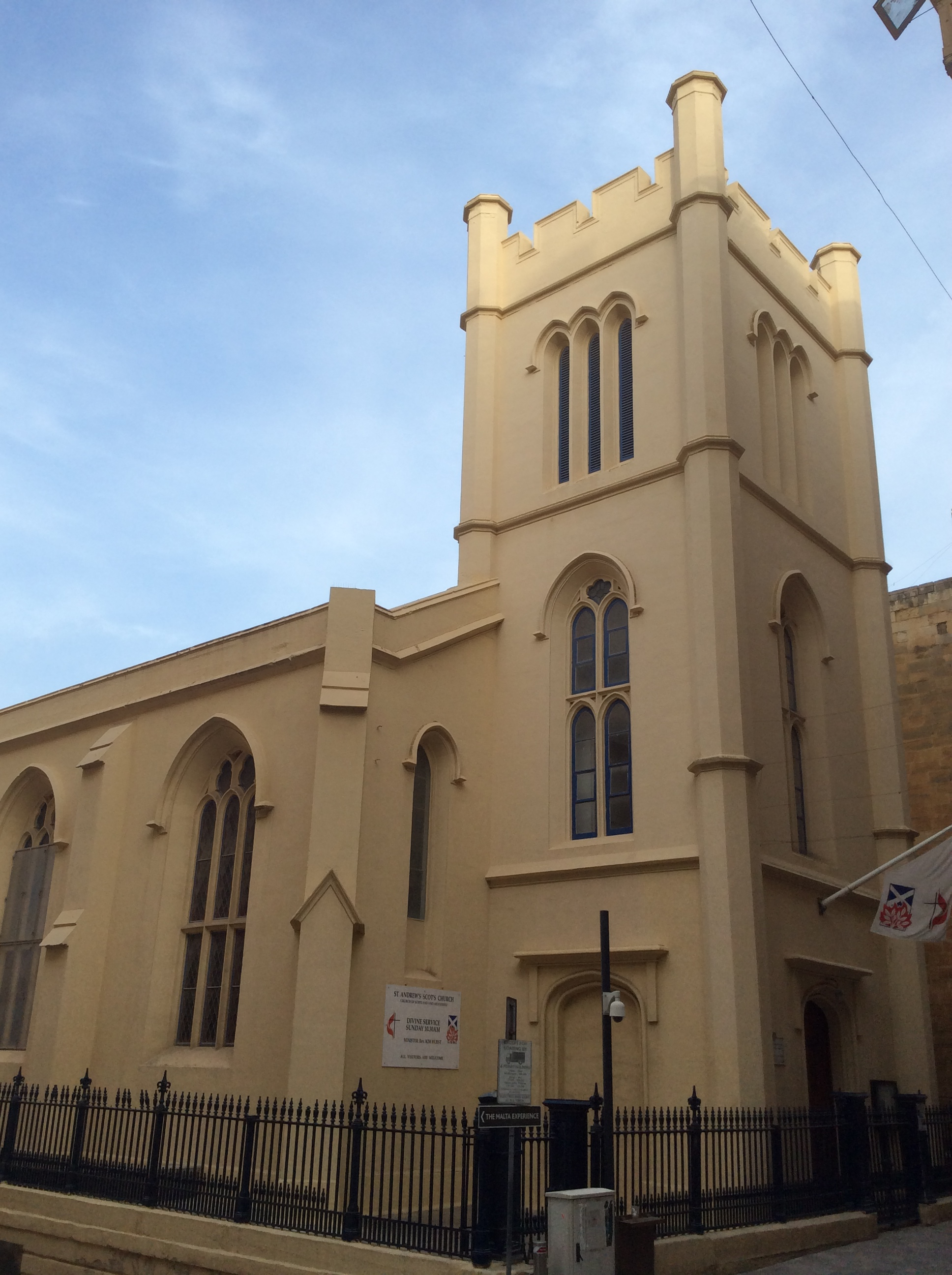
- St Andrew's Scots Church

- Location within Malta
- 35°53′51.4″N 14°30′35.3″E
- Location: Valletta
- Country: Malta
- Denomination: Church of Scotland (Presbyterian); Methodist Church of Great Britain

History
- Status: Active
- Founded: 1824

Architecture
- Functional status: Worship Service every Sunday at 10:30
- Architect: Giuseppe Bonavia
- Architectural type: Neo-Gothic
- Completed: 1857

St Andrew's Scots Church, sometimes known as the Church of Scotland, is a 19th-century church in Valletta, Malta. The church was built to the neo-Gothic design of Maltese architect Giuseppe Bonavia. It is still an active church today, as a joint congregation of the Church of Scotland, as part of the Presbytery of Europe, and the British Methodist Church South-East District.

== History ==
=== Casa Torrensi ===
The site was previously occupied by Casa Torrensi, built during the Order of St. John in the 17th-century, and carried the address number of 60. The site is located in the proximity of the Demandolx townhouses, of which two from three survived the war. The remaining two are today occupied by the Ministry of Finance.

=== The church ===
The site was bought by the Reverend John Keeling in 1824 in order to build the first non-Catholic church in Malta. It is the first Neo-Gothic building on the Maltese islands. Initially the church was built for the Methodist community, only to be later acquired by the Church of Scotland and used by the Presbyterian community. Since the turn of the 20th-century it has a mixed congregation that includes presbyterians, methodists, other protestants/reformists and some Catholics.

The church was built in 1857 by the Reverend Dr. George Wisely. He ministered a small methodist congregation from the year it was built till 1896.

It was the first neo-Gothic church to be built in Malta, on the designs of Maltese architect Giuseppe Bonavia.

Wiseley was minister of St Andrew's and Presbyterian Chaplain to the Forces in Malta from 1854 to 1914. The current minister is the Rev. Beata Thane from the Church of Scotland. Previous Ministers were the Rev. Kim Hurst from the Methodist Church, the Rev. Doug McRoberts, a Church of Scotland minister, who succeeded the Rev. David Morris, a Methodist who in 2002 had followed the Rev. Colin Westmarland (from 1975 onwards) who had been the first minister not to be a UK military chaplain.

== See also ==
- Culture of Malta
- History of Malta – Maltese history
- List of Churches in Malta
- Religion in Malta
