= Environment and Resources Authority =

- Maltese: Awtorità għall-Ambjent u r-Riżorsi

Agency overview
- Formed: 4 April 2016
- Preceding agency: Malta Environment and Planning Authority
- Jurisdiction: Malta
- Headquarters: Hexagon House, Marsa; 35°53′10.5″N 14°29′50.3″E
- Website: era.org.mt

The Environment and Resources Authority (ERA, Maltese: Awtorità għall-Ambjent u r-Riżorsi) is the regulatory agency responsible for the natural environment in Malta. It was formed from the demerger of the Malta Environment and Planning Authority in 2016, which also resulted in the creation of the Planning Authority.
