= Malta Environment and Planning Authority =

Former national agency responsible for the environment and planning in Malta

- Maltese: L-Awtorità ta' Malta dwar l-Ambjent u l-Ippjanar

Agency overview
- Dissolved: 4 April 2016
- Superseding agencies: Planning Authority; Environment and Resources Authority
- Jurisdiction: Malta
- Headquarters: St Francis Ravelin, Floriana Sir Luigi Camilleri Street, Victoria, Gozo
- Website: www.mepa.org.mt

The Malta Environment and Planning Authority (MEPA, Maltese: L-Awtorità ta' Malta dwar l-Ambjent u l-Ippjanar) was the national agency responsible for the environment and planning in Malta. It was established to regulate the environment and planning on the Maltese islands of Malta, Gozo and other small islets of the Maltese archipelago. MEPA was bound to follow the regulations of the Environment Protection Act (2001) and the Development Planning Act (1992) of the Laws of Malta. The national agency was also responsible for the implementation of Directives, Decisions and Regulations under the EU Environmental Acquis as Malta is a member of the European Union, while considering other recommendations and opinions of the Union. The Authority employed over 420 government workers, from a wide range of educational backgrounds, all within their merit of profession.

On 4 April 2016, MEPA was dissolved and two new authorities were established to take its place: the Planning Authority and the Environment and Resources Authority.

== Role ==
MEPA acted as the national representation under a number of international environmental conventions and multilateral agreements. These included information supported by the Aarhus Convention:

- On access to information;
- Public participation in decision-making;
- Access to justice in environmental matters.

== Governance ==
The Agency was governed by a board of professionals, whose responsibility was to provide strategic guidance within, laid by the laws of Malta. The board comprising a maximum of 15 personnel was led by the Executive Chairman, Perit Vincent Cassar. Members within the board included two representative members of the Parliament of Malta, who were knowledgeable and experienced about matters relating to the environment and development such commercial, industrial and social affairs. A number of appointed boards and committees provided strategic guidance or expert advice to the directorates to ensure that the organization fulfilled its functions and responsibilities efficiently and effectively, in line with legal obligations.

== Responsibility ==
MEPA's operational functions and responsibilities were carried out by the work of four main structures, namely:

- The Chairman’s Office was responsible for providing the framework within which the MEPA Board together with the Commissions and Committees operate.
- The secretariat was the point of reference for issuing and communicating the Board's and Commissions' decisions and in this context was a primary point of contact for ministries, departments and agencies as well as the general public.
- The Communications Office and Complaints office were an integral part of the function of this office.

== Aim ==
The Chief Executive Officer was responsible for the implementation of the aims and supervised and control the Directorates. The CEO and other directors were responsible for developing the necessary strategies. The Planning Directorate processed environment and planning applications. It was responsible for enforcement, policy development and plan making, transport planning and research and other.

== Enforcement ==
The Enforcement Directorate was responsible for both Development Control and Environmental Protection and for supporting the Authority in enforcement campaigns including Direct Action, enforcement, surveillance and actions as necessary to ensure compliance with the building development permits and to protect the environment to help achieve sustainable environmental improvement. The Environment Protection Directorate advised Government on environmental standards and policies, drew up plans and provided a licensing regime to safeguard and monitor the environment and controlled the activities having environmental impact. The Directorate for Corporate Services was responsible for Human Resources, Information Technology, Mapping and Land-surveying, support services and Finance. There were a number of boards and committees, which provide strategic guidance for the Directorates to ensure the organization fulfilled its functions and responsibilities efficiently and effectively, in line with its legal obligations.

== Grading of property ==
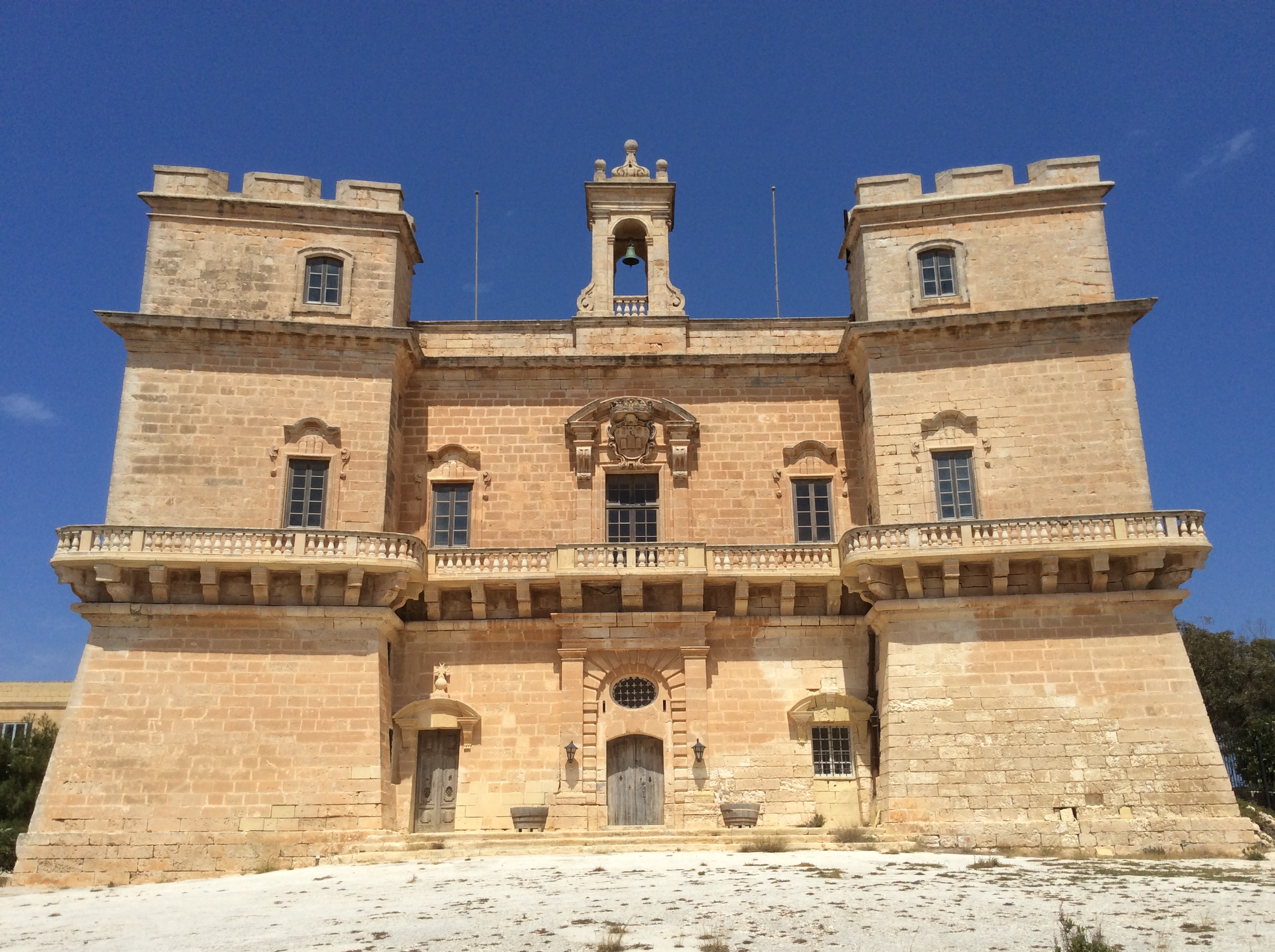
Selmun Palace, a scheduled property

Here is an incomplete list of graded property by MEPA according to category. The below property are named according to the official name used by MEPA and not as how they are known among the public.

Grade 1: Building at this grade have great historical and architectonical values and may not be altered

- Palazzo Dorell
- Palazzo Parisio (Valletta)
- San Anton Palace
- Villa Bologna
- Villa Francia
- Lija Belvedere Tower
- La Borsa
- Ponsonby's Column

Grade 2: Building at this grade have historical and architectonical value and can have moderate alterations

- Palazzo Dragonara
- Palazzo Nasciaro

Grade 3: Building at this grade are not considered important and can be demolished
