= Lija Belvedere Tower =

Building in Lija, Malta

Coordinates: 35.9020°N 14.4487°E

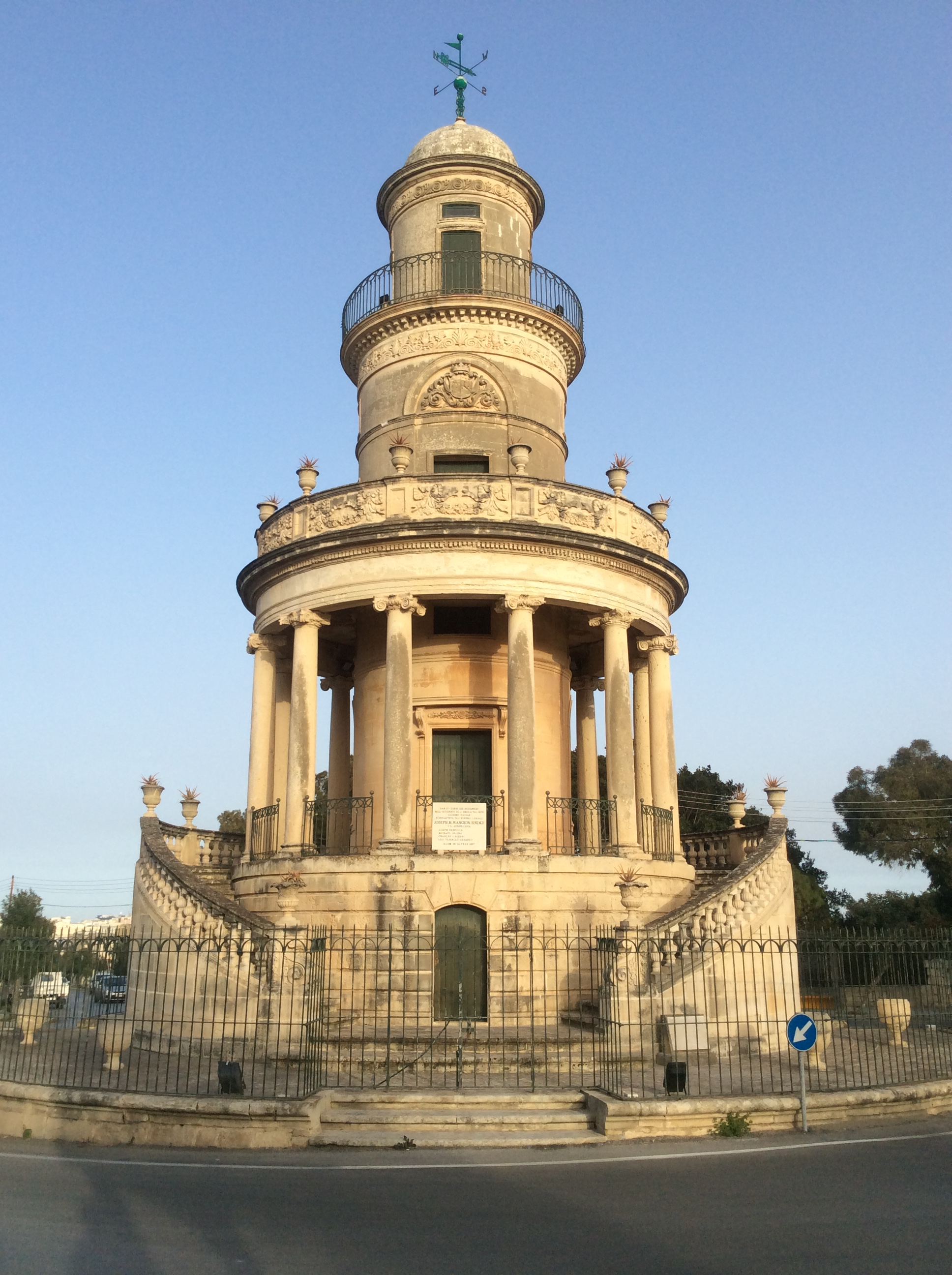
- View of the Lija Belvedere Tower
- Interactive map of the Lija Belvedere Tower area

General information
- Status: Intact
- Type: Folly
- Architectural style: Neoclassic
- Location: Lija, Malta
- Named for: Lija
- Completed: 1857
- Owner: Government of Malta

Technical details
- Material: Limestone

Design and construction
- Architect: Giuseppe Bonavia

The Lija Belvedere Tower (Maltese: Torri Belvedere) is a belvedere in Lija, Malta. It was built in the 19th century as a folly within a private garden, and it is now located on a roundabout.

== History ==
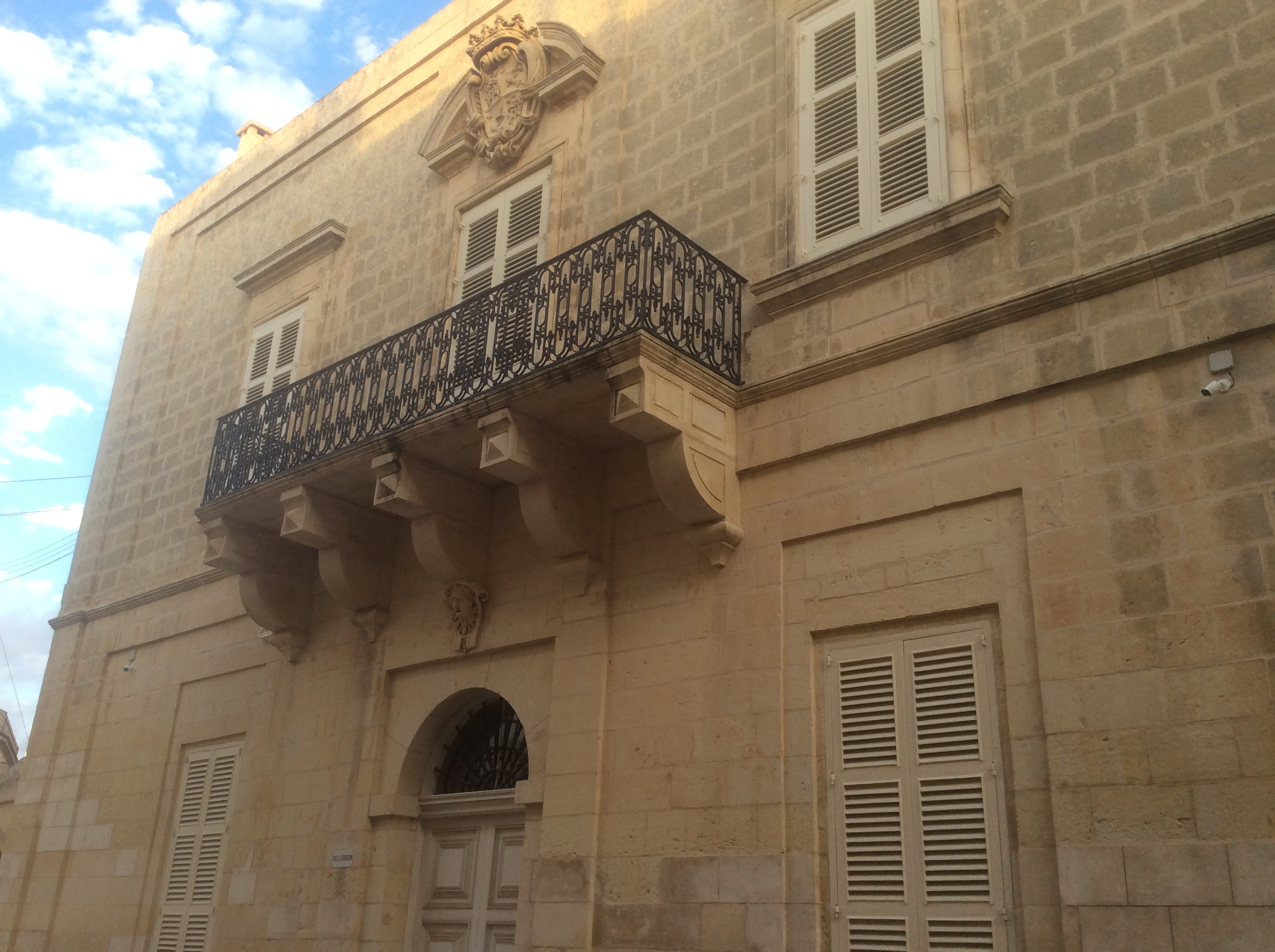
Villa Gourgion

The belvedere tower was built in 1857 as a folly within the gardens of Villa Gourgion, a 17th-century villa which belonged to the Marquis De Piro. It was designed by the architect Giuseppe Bonavia.

In the 1950s, part of the villa's garden was destroyed to make way for Transfiguration Avenue. The belvedere was retained as a roundabout, on the avenue and is now one of Lija's landmarks.

The tower was restored between 1995 and 1996, and is listed as a Grade 1 property by the Malta Environment and Planning Authority. It is also listed on the National Inventory of the Cultural Property of the Maltese Islands as part of Villa Gourgion.
