= Planning Authority (Malta) =

Government agency responsible for land use and planning on Malta

- Maltese: Awtorità tal-Ippjanar

Agency overview
- Formed: 4 April 2016
- Preceding agency: Malta Environment and Planning Authority
- Jurisdiction: Malta
- Headquarters: St Francis Ravelin, Floriana; St Martha Street, Victoria, Gozo; 35°53′24.2″N 14°30′10.2″E; 36°02′33.6″N 14°14′48.9″E
- Agency executive: Martin Saliba, Executive Chairperson
- Website: www.pa.org.mt

The Planning Authority (PA, Maltese: Awtorità tal-Ippjanar), sometimes still popularly mistakenly referred to as the previous MEPA, is a government agency which is responsible for land use and planning in Malta.

It was established on 4 April 2016 from the demerger of the Malta Environment and Planning Authority, which also resulted in the creation of the Environment and Resources Authority.

== Structure ==
The Planning Authority consists of a number of boards and committees:

- Executive Council
- Planning Board
- Planning Commission
- Agricultural Advisory Committee
- Design Advisory Committee
- Development Planning Fund

== Criticism ==
The Planning Authority is often criticized by locals and NGOs for approving permits for apartment flats that are deemed uncharacteristic for Malta's traditional landscape, with the flats considered overly large and made from non-limestone materials. It is also criticized for removing old villas and other buildings, despite the local populace often protesting against this.
