= La Borsa =

Historic building in Malta

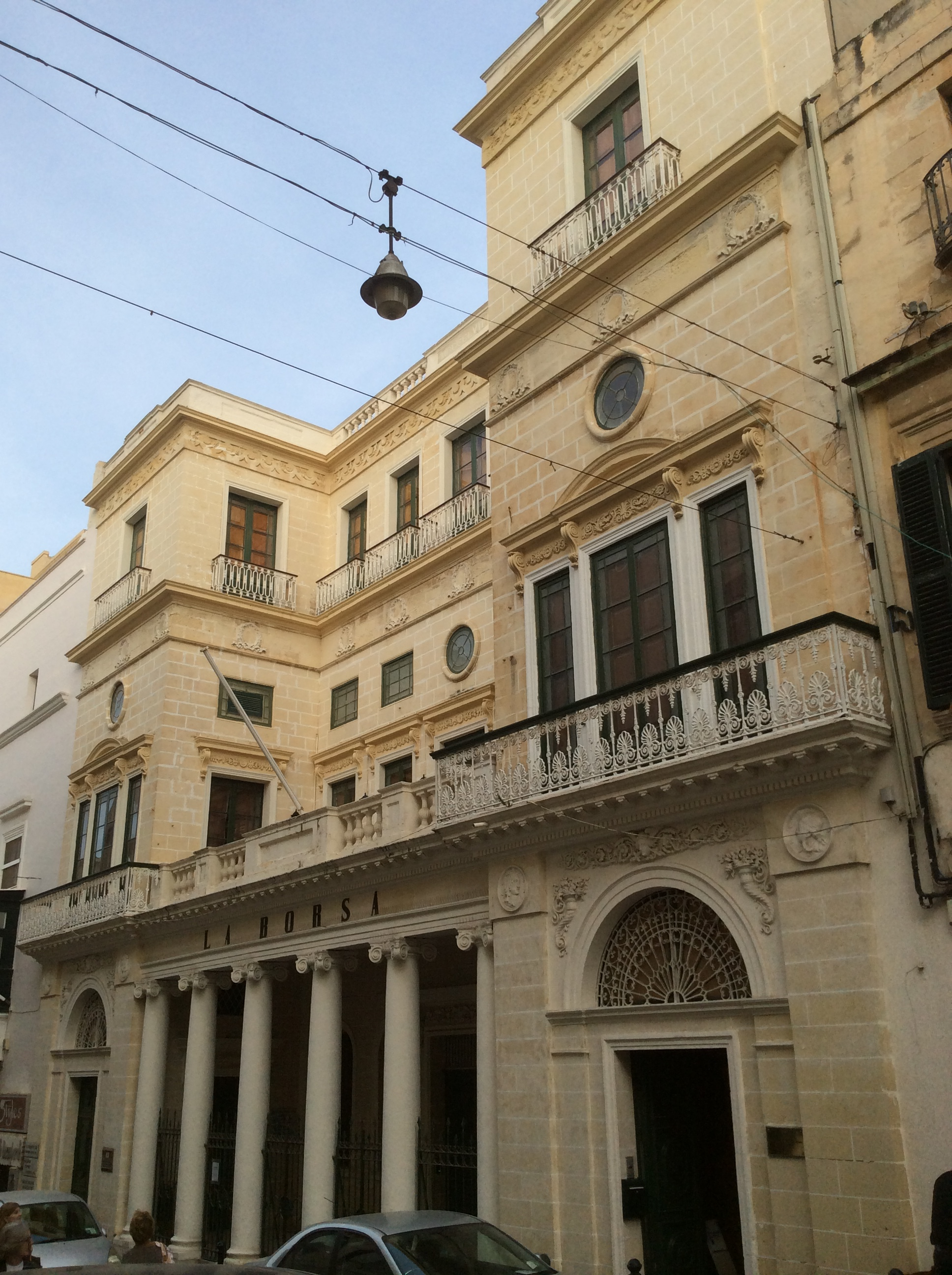
- View of La Borsa
- Alternative names: Exchange Buildings

General information
- Architectural style: Neoclassical and rococo
- Location: Valletta, Malta
- Coordinates: 35°53′57.76″N 14°30′52.46″E
- Completed: March 1857

Design and construction
- Architect: Giuseppe Bonavia

La Borsa, also known as the Exchange Buildings, is a 19th-century building in Valletta, Malta, which houses The Malta Chamber of Commerce, Enterprise and Industry.

The site of La Borsa was originally occupied by a house which belonged to the Priory of Castile. In 1853, the house was handed over to The Malta Chamber of Commerce and Enterprise, which had been formed in 1848. It was demolished to make way for new premises which were designed by the Maltese architect Giuseppe Bonavia. Works were undertaken by the contractor Michelangelo Azzopardi, and the building was inaugurated in March 1857. Some features within the building include the Lewis Farrugia Courtyard, Sir Agostino Portelli Hall, the Aula Conciliaris (Council Room), the Banif Lecture Hall and the BOV Meeting Room.

It is scheduled as a Grade 1 national monument by the Malta Environment and Planning Authority.

== Architecture ==
La Borsa was designed by Giuseppe Bonavia in the Neoclassical architectural style. Its design contrasts with Valletta's traditional architecture. Its façade has an imposing symmetrical colonnade in the Ionic order. It has three floors above street level and an underground level. The building's design is rather simple but elegant at the same time.
