= Royal Opera House, Valletta =

Former opera house in Valletta, Malta

Coordinates: 35.8967°N 14.5103°E

Royal Opera House
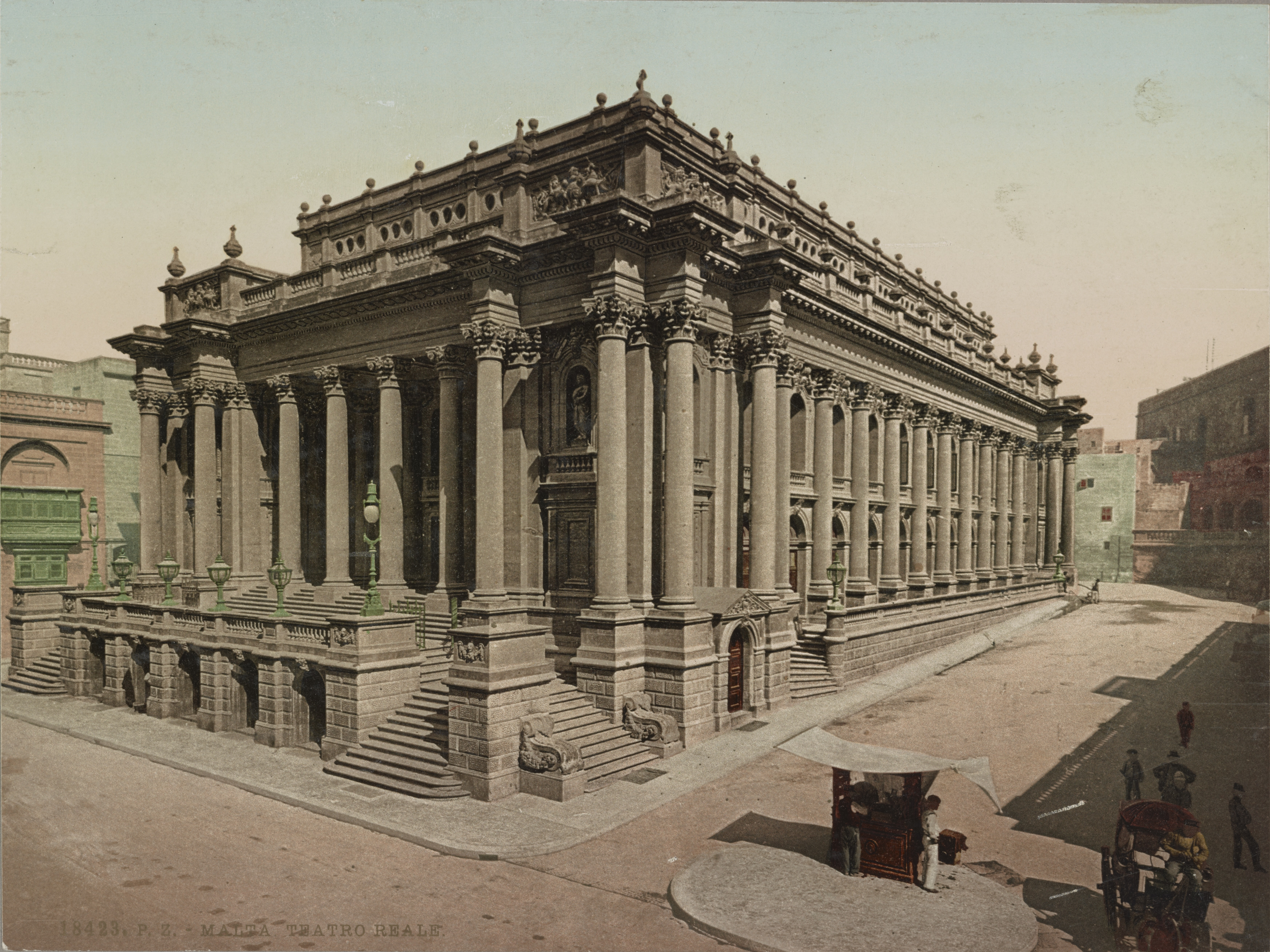
- Royal Opera House in 1911
- Interactive map of Royal Opera House
- Address: Republic Street; Valletta; Malta
- Capacity: 1295
- Type: Opera House

Construction
- Opened: 1866
- Rebuilt: Reopened as open-air theatre in 2013
- Years active: 1866–1873; 1877–1942
- Architect: Edward Middleton Barry

The Royal Opera House, also known as the Royal Theatre (Maltese: It-Teatru Rjal, Italian: Teatro Reale), was an opera house and performing arts venue in Valletta, Malta. It was designed by the English architect Edward Middleton Barry and was erected in 1866. In 1873 its interior was extensively damaged by fire but was eventually restored by 1877. The theatre received a direct hit from aerial bombing in 1942 during World War II. Prior to its destruction, it was one of the most beautiful and iconic buildings in Valletta. After several abandoned plans to rebuild the theatre, the ruins were redesigned by the Italian architect Renzo Piano and in 2013 it once again started functioning as a performance venue, called Pjazza Teatru Rjal.

== History ==
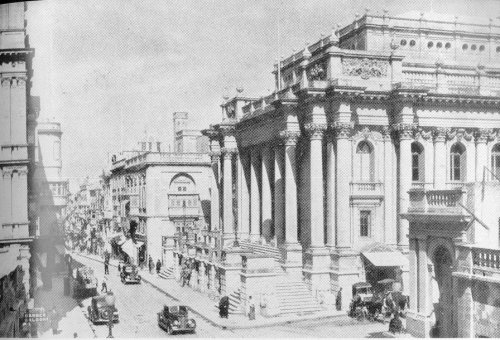
The Opera House in 1935.

The design of the building was entrusted to Edward Middleton Barry, the architect of Covent Garden Theatre, and the classic design plan was completed by 1861. The original plans had to be altered because the sloping streets on the sides of the theatre had not been taken into consideration. This resulted in a terrace being added on the side of Strada Reale (nowadays Republic Street) designed by Maltese architects.

The building of the 206 feet (63 m) by 112 feet (34 m) site started in 1862, after what was the Casa della Giornata was demolished. After four years, the Opera House, with a seating capacity of 1,095 and 200 standing, was ready for the official opening on 9 October 1866.

The theatre was not to last long; on 25 May 1873, a mere six years after its opening, it was brought to a premature end by a fire. The exterior of the theatre was undamaged but the interior stonework was calcified by the intense heat.

It was decided to rebuild the theatre, and after the issuing of tenders for the work and a lot of arguing whether the front had to be changed or not, the theatre was ready. On 11 October 1877, nearly four and a half years after the fire, the theatre reopened with a performance of Verdi's Aida.

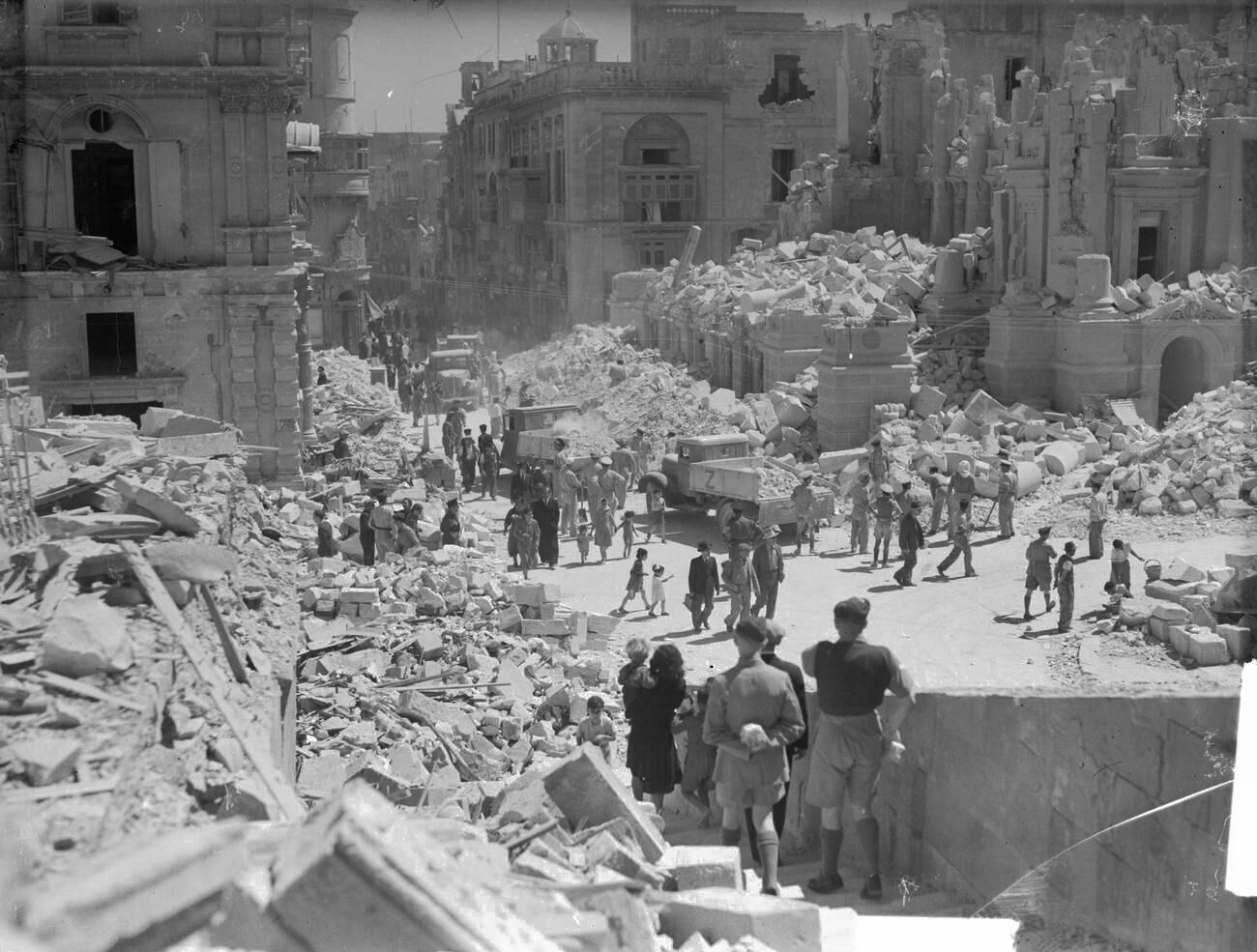
Strada Reale in Valletta after an air raid. The ruins of the Opera House can be seen on the right.

Some 65 years later, tragedy struck the Royal Opera House again:

On the evening of Tuesday, April 7, 1942, the theatre was devastated by Luftwaffe bombers. The next morning a people hardened by aerial bombing inspected the remains of their national theatre.... The portico and the auditorium were a heap of stones, the roof a gaping hole of twisted girders. The rear end starting half way from the colonnade was however intact.

The remaining structures were razed in the late 1950s as a safety precaution. There is a claim that German prisoners-of-war in Malta offered to rebuild the theatre in 1946 with the Government declining due to Union pressure; the more likely reason might be that few of these prisoners of war could be expected to be qualified masons.

All that remained of the Opera House were the terrace and parts of the columns.

== Site ruins and reconstruction plans ==
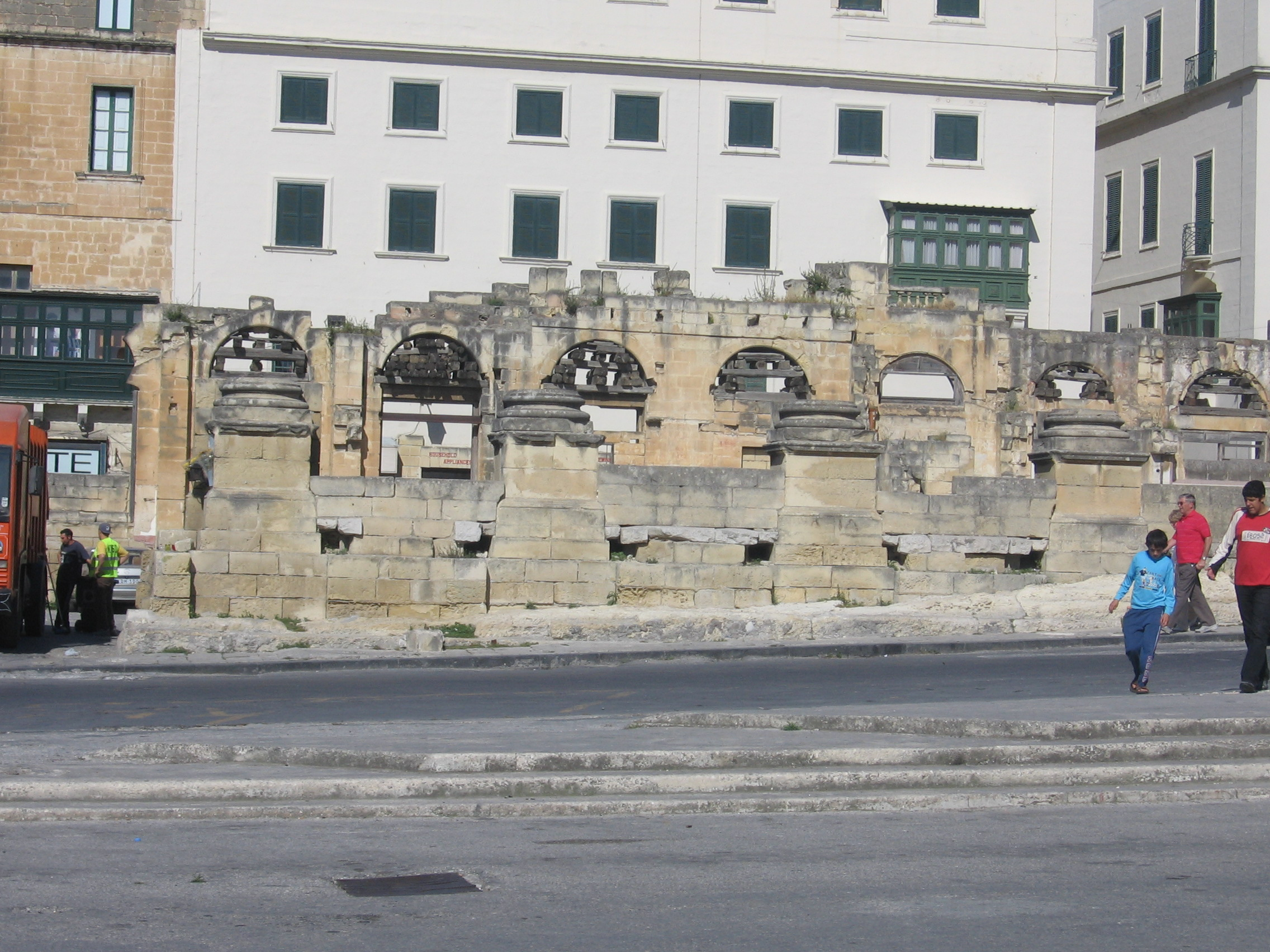
The ruins of the Opera House, in 2006, with the interior used as a car park

Although the bombed site was cleared of much of the rubble and all of the remaining decorative sculpture, rebuilding was repeatedly postponed by successive post-War governments, in favour of reconstruction projects that were deemed to be more pressing.

In 1953 six renowned architects submitted designs for the new theatre. The Committee chose Zavellani-Rossi's project and recommended its acceptance by Government subject to certain alterations. The project ground to a halt on Labour's re-election, contending that it was not in a position to spend so much money on a theatre when so many other projects needed attention. Although a provision of £280,000 for the reconstruction of the theatre had been made in the 1955-56 budget, these were never used. By 1957 the project had been shelved and after 1961 all references to the theatre in the country's development plans were omitted.

In the 1980s contact was made with the architect Renzo Piano to design a building to be constructed on site and to rehabilitate the entrance of the city. Piano submitted the plans which were approved by the Government in 1990 but work never started. In 1996 the incoming Labour Government announced that reconstruction of the site into a commercial and cultural complex together with an underground car park would be Malta's millennium project. In the late 1990s the Maltese architect Richard England was also commissioned to come up with plans for a cultural centre. Each time, controversies killed off all initiatives.

== Pjazza Teatru Rjal ==
Pjazza Teatru Rjal
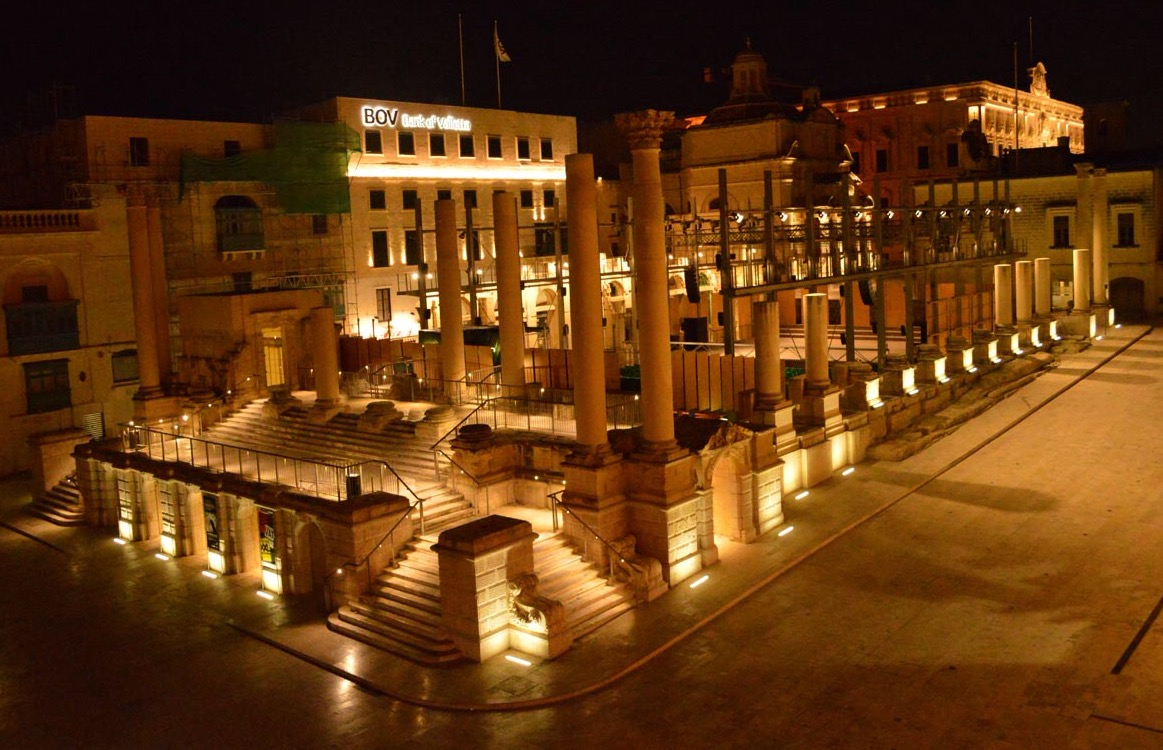
- Pjazza Teatru Rjal, illuminated at night
- Interactive map of Pjazza Teatru Rjal
- Address: Republic Street; Valletta; Malta
- Type: Theatre

Construction
- Opened: 2013
- Years active: 2013–present
- Architect: Renzo Piano

Website
- pjazzateatrurjal.mt

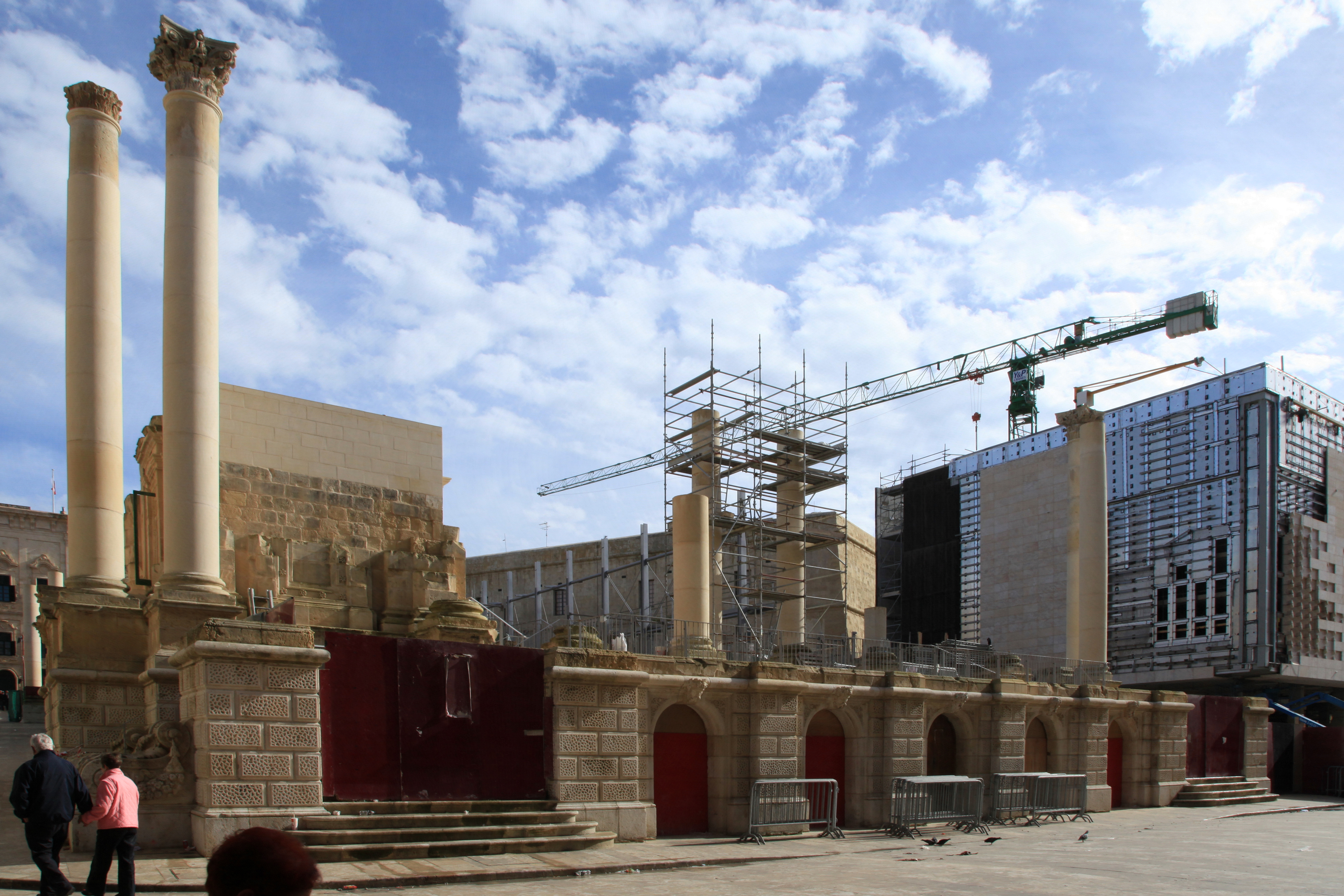
Pjazza Teatru Rjal under construction.

In 2006 the government announced a proposal to redevelop the site for a dedicated House of Parliament, which by then was located in the former Armoury of the Grandmaster's Palace. The proposal was not well received since it had always been assumed that the site would eventually be developed into something that would house a cultural institution; however, Renzo Piano was again approached and started to work on new designs. The proposal was ostensibly shelved until after the general elections of 2008 and, on 1 December 2008, Prime Minister Lawrence Gonzi revived the proposal with a budget of €80 million. Piano dissuaded the Government from building a Parliament on site of the Opera House, instead planning a House of Parliament on present-day Freedom Square and a re-modelling of the city gate. Piano proposed an open-air theatre for the site.

The development of the theatre by Piano is the most controversial in its time. The government still went ahead with the plans and the open-air theatre was officially inaugurated on 8 August 2013. The theatre was named Pjazza Teatru Rjal after the original structure. The name translates to Royal Theatre Square, but the venue is always referred to by its Maltese name, even when written about in English.
