= De Piro =

Maltese noble family

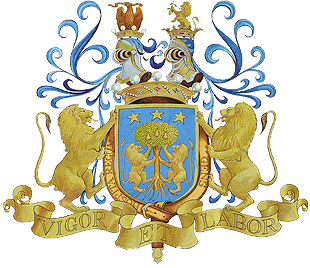
The de Piro coat of arms

The de Piro family is a Maltese noble family, of Italian origins, which settled in Malta with the Order of St John in 1530.

== History ==
The family hails originally from Como where the ruins of the Castel Grumello de Piro, owned by Corrado de Piro in the fourteenth century, can be seen. Cosimo de Piro left Rhodes in the general exodus of the Knights of St John and settled in Malta following its granting to the Order by Emperor Charles V in 1530, where Grand Master Fra’ Philippe Villiers de L'Isle-Adam made him Commander of the Grand Master's Arsenal. The family was made Patricians of Rome on 11 June 1590. Giovanni Pio, was created Baron of Budach in 1716 by Grand Master Perellos and Marquis de Piro in the Kingdom of Castile by King Philip V of Spain in 1742.

He was Secretary of the Inquisition (1720), Curator of the Holy Office from 1728 and Lieutenant of the regimental company to which the Grand Master's famigliari belonged. Giovanni Pio established the family's fortunes through a combination of judicious investments and financial management, and an advantageous marriage to Anna Antonia Gourgion. He was predeceased by his son, and was succeeded in his titles by his grandson Vincenzo (1736–1799), Procurator of the Inquisition and Colonel Commandant of the Royal Sicilian Regiment, who married Maria Testaferrata Abela. His eldest son Antonio inherited the barony, while his second son Giuseppe was nominated to the Marquisate.

From 15 September 1799 to 8 September 1800 Giuseppe was captain of the ‘Cacciatori Maltesi’ who fought against Napoleon Bonaparte; under British rule he became Colonel of the Royal Malta Fencible Regiment, was appointed CMG, and was always selected to convey personally any dispatches to Lord Nelson. In successive generations, the family provided many men of note: Sir Giuseppe Maria GCMG, 4th Baron of Budach (1794–1870) was the first Maltese Captain Commandant of the Maltese Militia, married Antonia Moscati Gatto Xara 3rd Baroness of Benwarrad and lived in the magnificent Palazzo Parisio, where Napoleon had chosen to spend his days in Malta. Giuseppe, 6th Baron of Budach (1845–1916) was Chamberlain to the Pope.

He was succeeded by his nephew, son of his younger brother Alessandro (1849–1899) who married Orsola Agius Caruana and brought to the family a palace in Florence. Another of Alessandro and Orsola's sons is Servant of God Monsignor Giuseppe de Piro, founder of the Missionary Society of St Paul. Giuseppe Lorenzo, 6th Marquis de Piro (born 1858) was educated at Stonyhurst College, Chamberlain to Pope Leo XIII, ADC to the Governor of Malta. His only daughter, Adelina Victoria, succeeded as 7th Marchioness but died childless, when the marquisate was reunited with the barony. Igino, 7th Baron of Budach (1874–1942) joined the King's Liverpool Regiment, fought in the Boer War and was present at the Siege of Ladysmith.

On his retirement from military service, he returned to Malta, was elected President of the Senate (and later resigned on the principle of ‘no taxation without representation’), served on the Committee of Privileges of the Maltese Nobility and represented Malta at the coronation of King George VI. He gave the land on which the Basilica of Ta' Pinu in Gozo was built. His son Jerome, 8th Baron of Budach and 8th Marquis de Piro (1914–1996), served in the Second World War with the Royal Malta Artillery, served as President of the Committee of Privileges of the Maltese Nobility, and represented Malta at the Coronation of Queen Elizabeth II.

== Nobility ==
- Made Patricians of Rome on 11th June 1590.
- Barone di Budach (Budacco/Budaq) was conferred by Grand Master Perellos, by a diploma of 23rd April 1716 to Gio Pio de Piro.
- Most Illustrious and Noble (1727),
- Marques de Piro in Spain (1742), granted by King Philip V of Spain to Gio Pio de Piro new commercial representatives of the Spanish Crown in Malta.

== Their fief ==
The noble family de Piro settled in Valletta, Malta, at Casa Rocca Piccola, a 16th-century palace.

After the French occupation of Malta, the family acquired Palazzo Parisio also located in Valletta, this property was later purchased by the Government of Malta. In addition, the family owns the land of the Barony of Budack and the Marquisate of Piro, both in Malta.

== Family legacy ==
The main legacy of the de Piro family is the long-lasting historical and architectural heritage work of the building and historical records of their main residence in Valletta, the renowned Casa Rocca Piccola.

== Family today ==
Jerome de Piro, the 8th Baron, married Philomena (Phyllis) Cassar Torreggiani daughter of Antonio Cassar-Torreggiani and Margaret Cali (daughter of the artist Giuseppe Cali). They had 5 children Nicholas (married to Frances Wilson) Madeleine(married to Dr. John O'Connell), Mary de Piro (married to Simon Bailey) Elizabeth (married to Ralph Bianchi) and Margaret (married to the late Paul Bianchi), all with issue.

Nicholas de Piro, 9th Baron of Budach and 9th Marquis de Piro, was born in 1941, he is married to Frances Wilson, is a published author, art historian and poet. Nicholas and his wife Frances have four children Cosimo, Clement, Louisa and Anton’, and grandchildren Serafina, Nicholas, Mary Benedicta, Edward, Isabella, Alexander, Maximilian, Olympia and Elisabeth.
