= Casa Rocca Piccola =

16th-century palace in Malta

Coordinates: 35°53′59.5″N 14°30′55.5″E

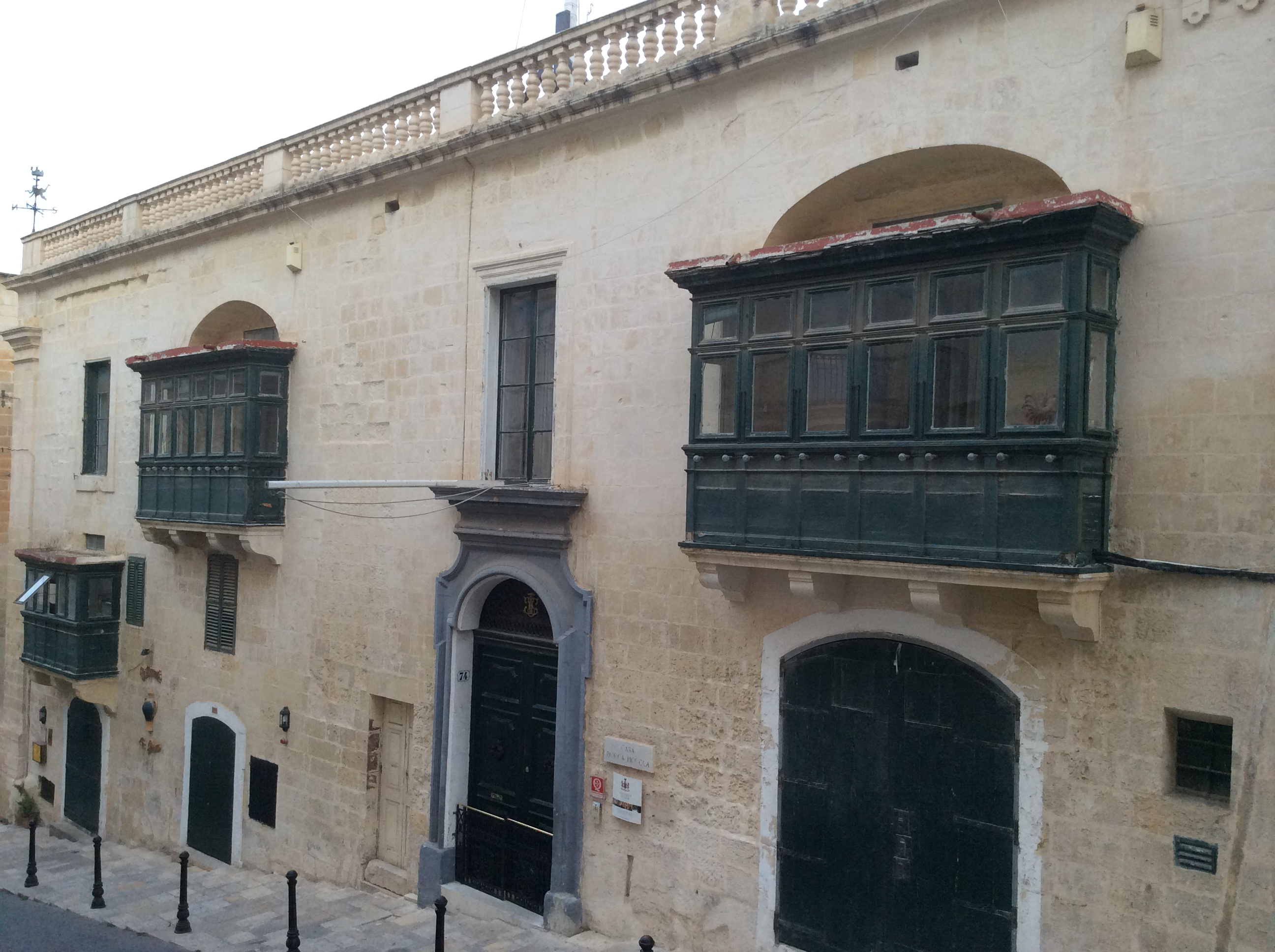
- Entrance of Casa Rocca Piccola
- Location: Valletta
- Type: Palace
- Website: www.casaroccapiccola.com

Casa Rocca Piccola is a 16th-century palace in Malta, and home of the noble Maltese family de Piro. It is situated in Valletta, the capital city of Malta. There are daily tours from 10am till 5pm (last admission 4pm). The palace includes a BnB with 5 rooms and a restaurant called La Giara Restaurant.

== History ==
The Casa Rocca Piccola was built in 1580 an era in which the Knights of St John, having successfully fought off the invading Turks in 1565, decided to build a prestigious city to rival other European capitals such as Paris and Venice. Palaces were designed for prestige and aesthetic beauty in most of Valletta's streets, and bastion walls fortified the new sixteenth-century city. Casa Rocca Piccola was one of two houses built in Valletta by Admiral Don Pietro la Rocca. It is referenced in maps of the time as "la casa con giardino" meaning, the house with the garden, as normally houses in Valletta were not allowed gardens. Changes were made in the late 18th century to divide the house into two smaller houses. Further changes were made in 1918 and before the second world war an air raid shelters was added. The Casa Rocca Piccola Family Shelter is the second air-raid shelter to be dug in Malta.

== Design and Building ==
Casa Rocca Piccola was designed with long enfilades of interconnecting rooms on the first floor, while leaving the ground floor rooms for kitchens and stables. The house has over fifty rooms, including two libraries, two dining rooms, many drawing rooms, and a chapel.

== Collections ==
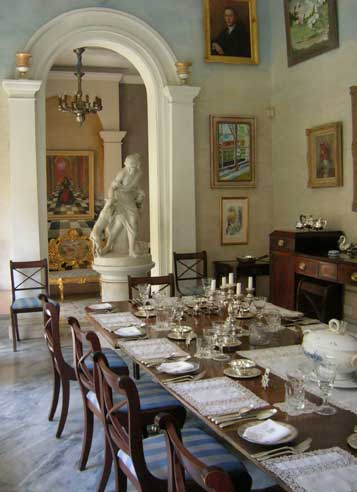
Casa Rocca Piccola's dining room

The house is furnished with collections of furniture, silver and paintings from Malta and Europe. The de Piro family archives, Archivium de Piro, are housed in The Archive Room at Casa Rocca Piccola. They contain details records of family and state business dating from the late 16th century to the present day. These include business contracts, marriage contracts, bills, wills, and court cases. The archives have been used for research projects at the University of Malta and the University of Oxford.

Casa Rocca Piccola houses Malta's largest private collection of antique costumes. There is both formal and informal wear from the 18th to the 20th century. Malta has a long tradition of lace making. Casa Rocca Piccola houses the largest private collection of Maltese lace. Lace was used in different ways for different occasions, both religious and secular. Casa Rocca Piccola founded and hosts the annual HSBC Malta Lace Competition.

Casa Rocca Piccola has had tenants since the 16th century.

== Architecture ==
The building saw several modifications over the years with the main design being Palladian architecture. In the early 20th century part of the garden was built, to extend the house, in the Art Deco style.
