= Palazzo Parisio (Valletta) =

Palace in Malta

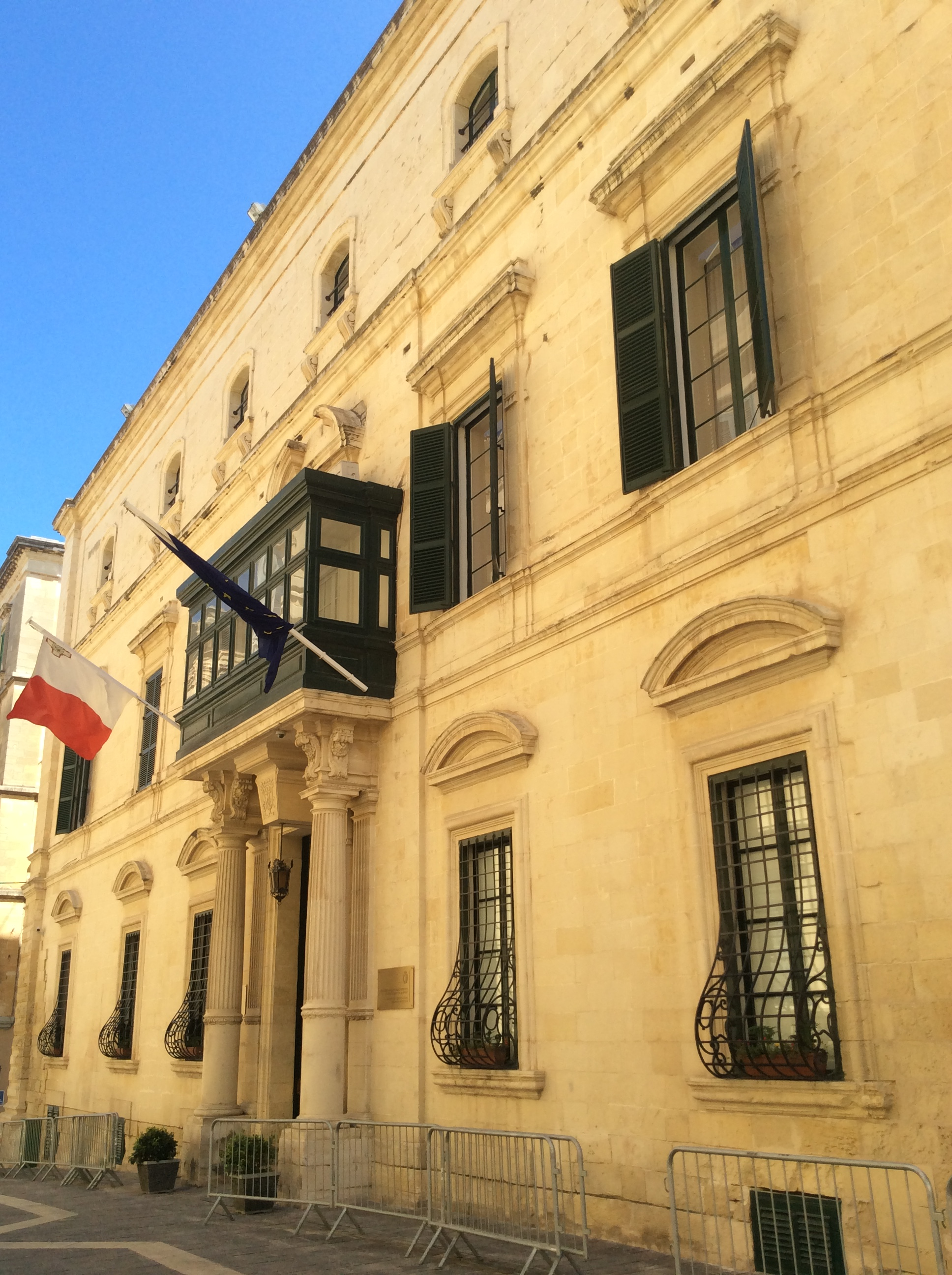
- Front façade of Palazzo Parisio
- Interactive map of the Palazzo Parisio area
- Alternative names: Casa Parisio

General information
- Status: Intact
- Type: Palace
- Architectural style: Neoclassical and Baroque
- Location: Valletta, Malta
- Coordinates: 35°53′46.7″N 14°30′41.6″E
- Current tenants: Ministry for Foreign Affairs
- Named for: Paolo Parisio Muscati
- Construction started: c. 1740
- Completed: 1744
- Owner: Government of Malta

Technical details
- Material: Limestone
- Floor count: 3

Design and construction
- Architect: Peruzzi

Website
- Ministry for Foreign Affairs

Palazzo Parisio, sometimes known as Casa Parisio, (Note: "Palazzo" (pl. palazzi): is any large building property of the state or private (often much smaller than the term palace implies in the English-speaking world). While palazzo is the technically correct appellation, and postal address, no aristocrat would ever use the word, instead referring to his or her own house, however large, as "casa". "Palazzo" followed by the family name was the term used by officials, tradesmen, and delivery men. During the rule of the Order it was known as Casa Parisio/Parisi or Casa del Barone Parisio/Parisi.) is a palace in Valletta, Malta. It was built in the 1740s by Domenico Sceberras, and eventually passed into the hands of the Muscati and Parisio Muscati families. It was Napoleon's residence for six days in June 1798, during the early days of the French occupation of Malta. The palace was eventually acquired by the de Piro family, and was later purchased by the Government of Malta. It was used as the General Post Office from 1886 to 1973, then the Ministry for Agriculture, and it now houses the Ministry for Foreign Affairs.

== Location ==
Palazzo Parisio is on Merchants Street, originally called Strada San Giacomo, one of the main streets in Valletta. The palace is adjacent to Auberge de Castille, which is now the office of the Prime Minister. It faces Auberge d'Italie, which houses Muza, the National museum of art.

== History ==
=== Construction and early history ===
The site of Palazzo Parisio originally contained two town houses, which belonged to Fra Michel Fonterme dit la Chiesa and Francesco This. The houses were purchased by Fra Giovanni di Ventimiglia, the Balì of Manosca, in 1608. His descendants exchanged the houses with Maria Sceberras in 1717.

In about 1740, Domenico Sceberras demolished the town houses and began to build the palace. It was completed in 1744 by Margherita Muscati, his sister, and remained in the hands of the Muscati family. Eventually, it was inherited by Anna Muscati, who married Domenico Parisio. By the late 18th century, the palace belonged to Paolo Parisio Muscati, who named the building Palazzo Parisio.

=== French occupation ===
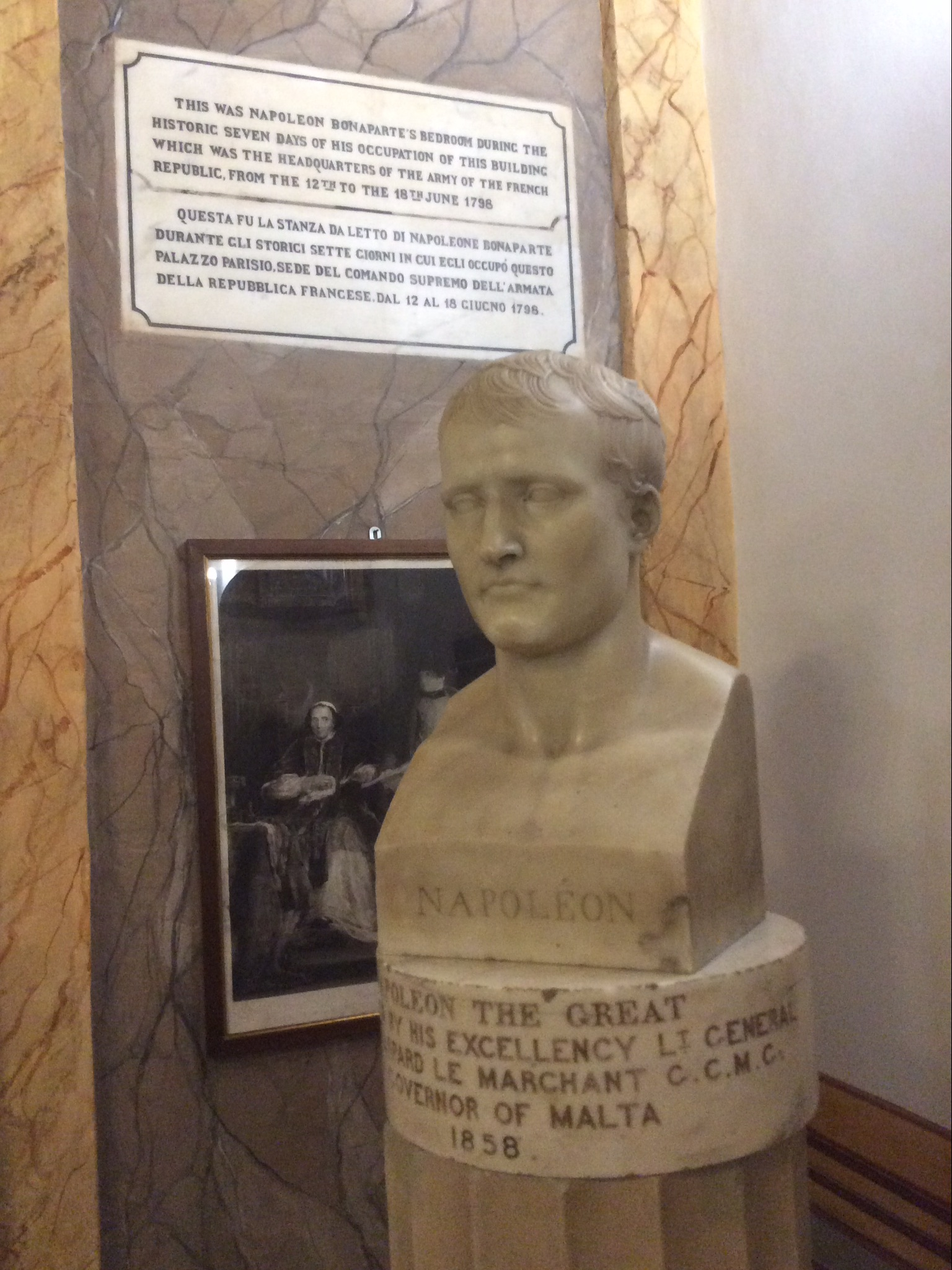
Bust of Napoleon commemorating his stay at the palace.

After the French invasion of Malta, Napoleon stayed at Palazzo Parisio for six days from 12 to 18 June 1798, before embarking on the Egyptian campaign. Following the Maltese uprising against French rule, Parisio Muscati left Valletta to join the Maltese insurgents, where he commanded the Naxxar battalion.

=== Nineteenth century ===
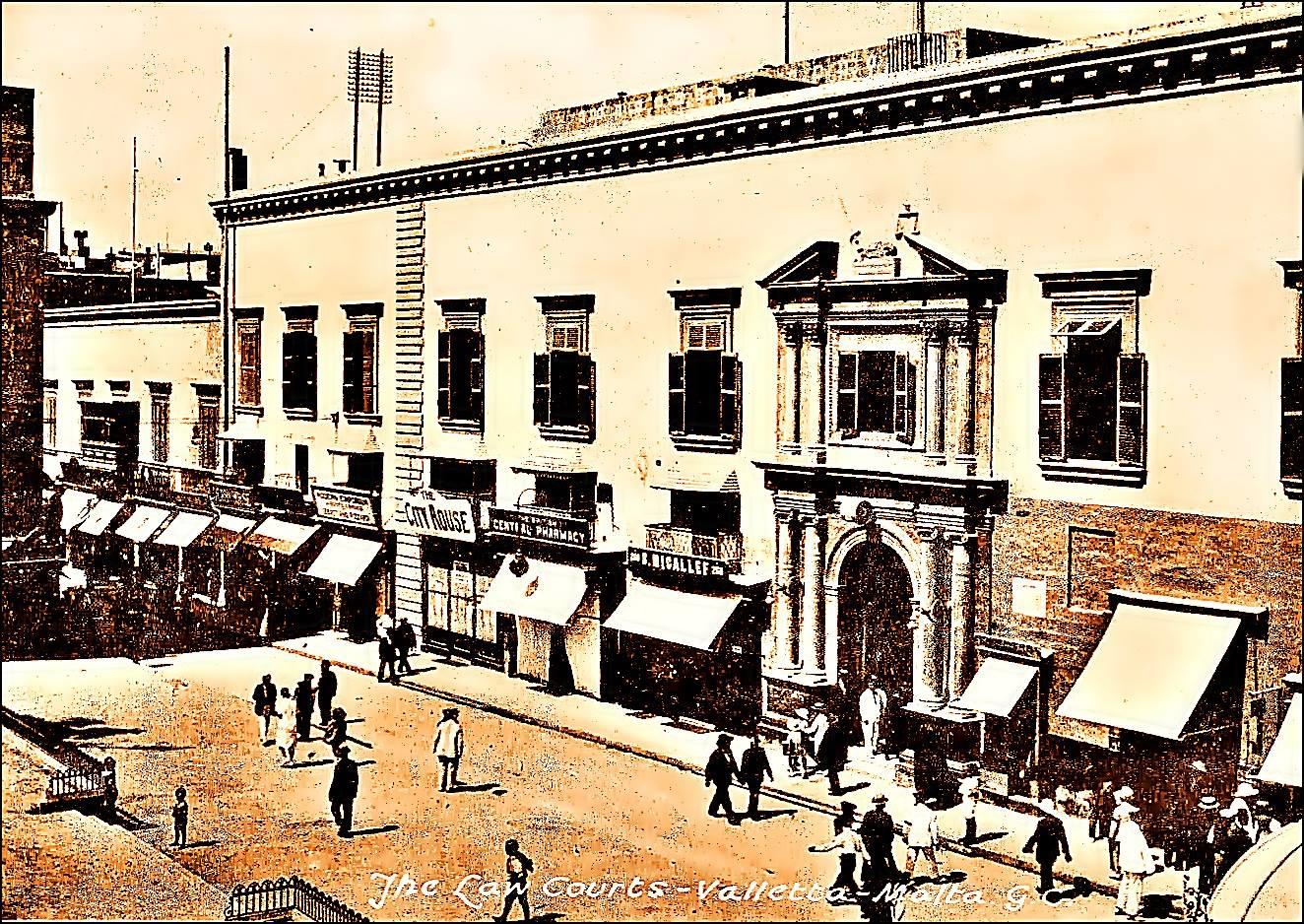
Casa Caccia (left) and the Auberge (right)

After Malta became a British protectorate in 1800, Pario family returned to the palace. On 26 November of that year, Ralph Abercrombie arrived in Malta on board HMS Diadem, and stayed at the palace until he left for Egypt on 20 December. From 25 January to 14 May 1841, Lord Lynedoch, a personal friend of Parisio Muscati, also took up temporary residence at the palace during his stay in Malta.

Following Parisio Muscati's death in December 1841, the palace was passed to his wife Antonia Muscati Xara. She married Joseph de Piro and the palace passed into the hands of the de Piro family after she died in 1856. The de Piro family had eventually came to an agreement with the British government to exchange the palace with Casa Caccia.

=== General Post Office ===
By the 1880s, Palazzo Parisio was co-owned by around 100 people, and was in poor condition. In 1886 the postmaster-general, Ferdinand Inglott, persuaded the owners to lease, and eventually to sell, the palace to the government. It was renovated, and opened as the General Post Office (GPO) in May 1886. The ground floor was used as a livery yard for horses to be used by postmen.

A third floor which housed the Audit Office was added after World War I. The building was included on the Antiquities List of 1925.

On 24 April 1942, during World War II, the palace was partially destroyed by aerial bombardment. The GPO moved to the primary school of Ħamrun until it returned to the ruined palace on 16 January 1943. The palace was rebuilt after the war, but some of the frescoes were lost.

On 4 July 1973, the GPO moved from Palazzo Parisio to Auberge d'Italie, just across the street. The central mail room, registered letter branch and poste restante were moved to the former Garrison Chapel, which is now occupied by the Malta Stock Exchange.

=== Ministry for Foreign Affairs ===
The first ministry that the building served was the Ministry for Posts and Agriculture. The Ministry for Foreign Affairs moved to the palace in October 1973. The exterior and interior of the building were subsequently restored. Approximately one hundred workers, including diplomats, work in the building. Since 2014 the building has been considered unsafe, according to appointed architects, and is in process of refurbishment.

The palace is scheduled as a Grade 1 national monument by the Malta Environment and Planning Authority. It is also listed on the National Inventory of the Cultural Property of the Maltese Islands.

== Architecture ==
Palazzo Parisio was designed by the architect Peruzzi, and it contains elements from both neoclassical and baroque architecture.

The palace consists of three blocks, which surround a central courtyard. The façade contains an elaborate columned doorway, supporting a timber balcony. There are three windows on either side of the doorway.

Exterior of Palazzo Parisio
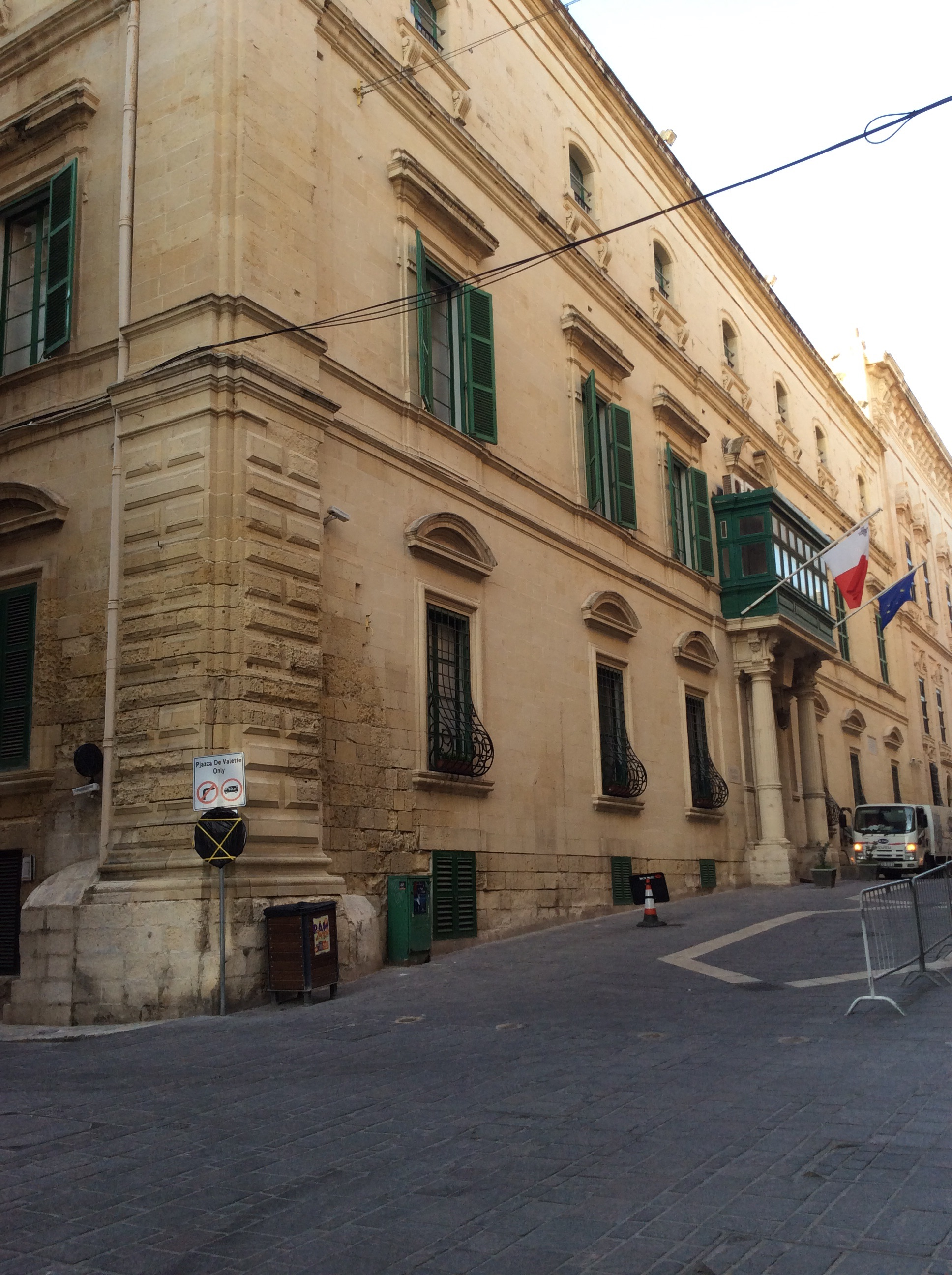
Palazzo Parisio from Merchants Street

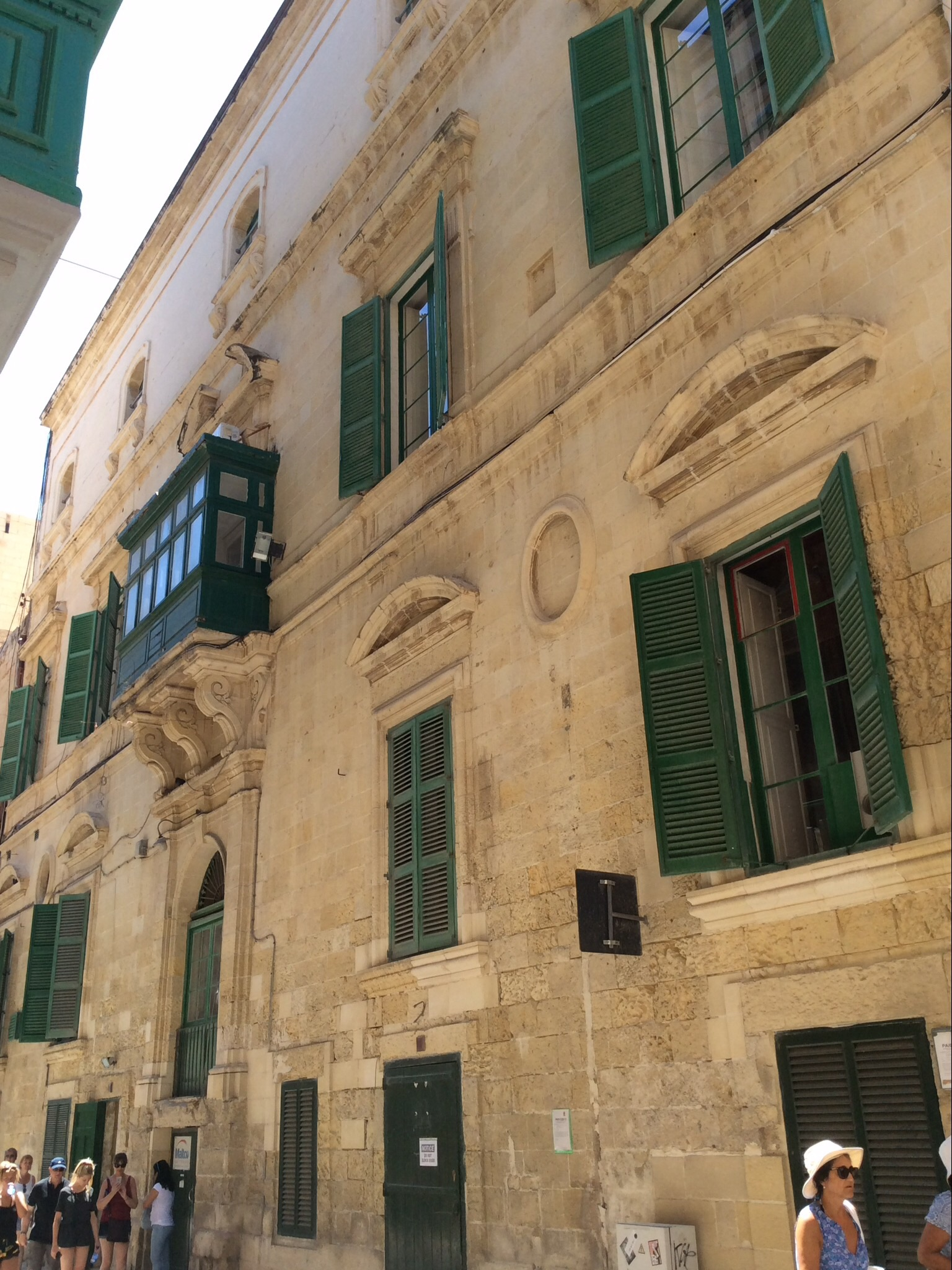
Side façade along Melita Street

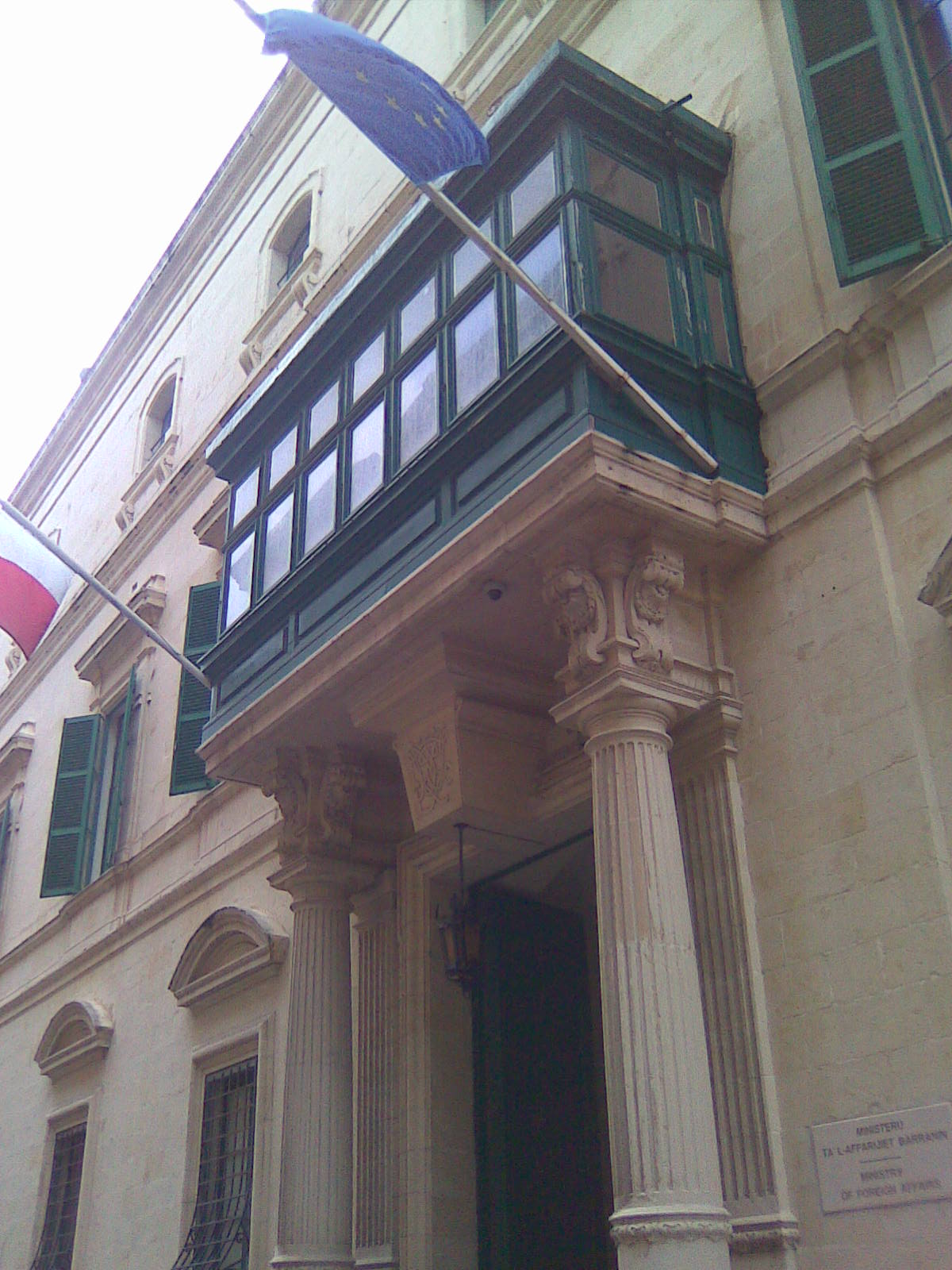
Doorway and balcony

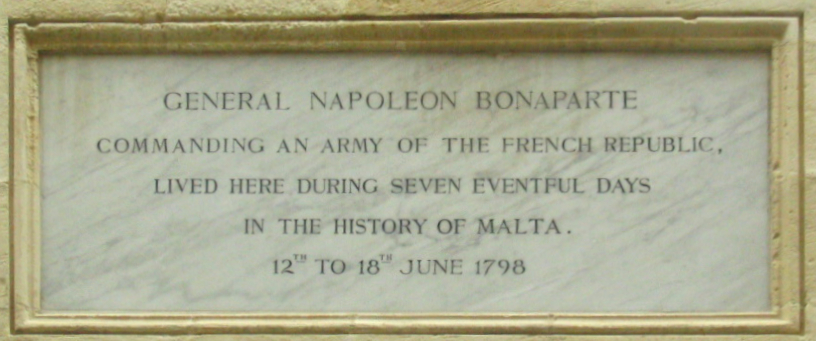
Plaque commemorating Napoleon's stay

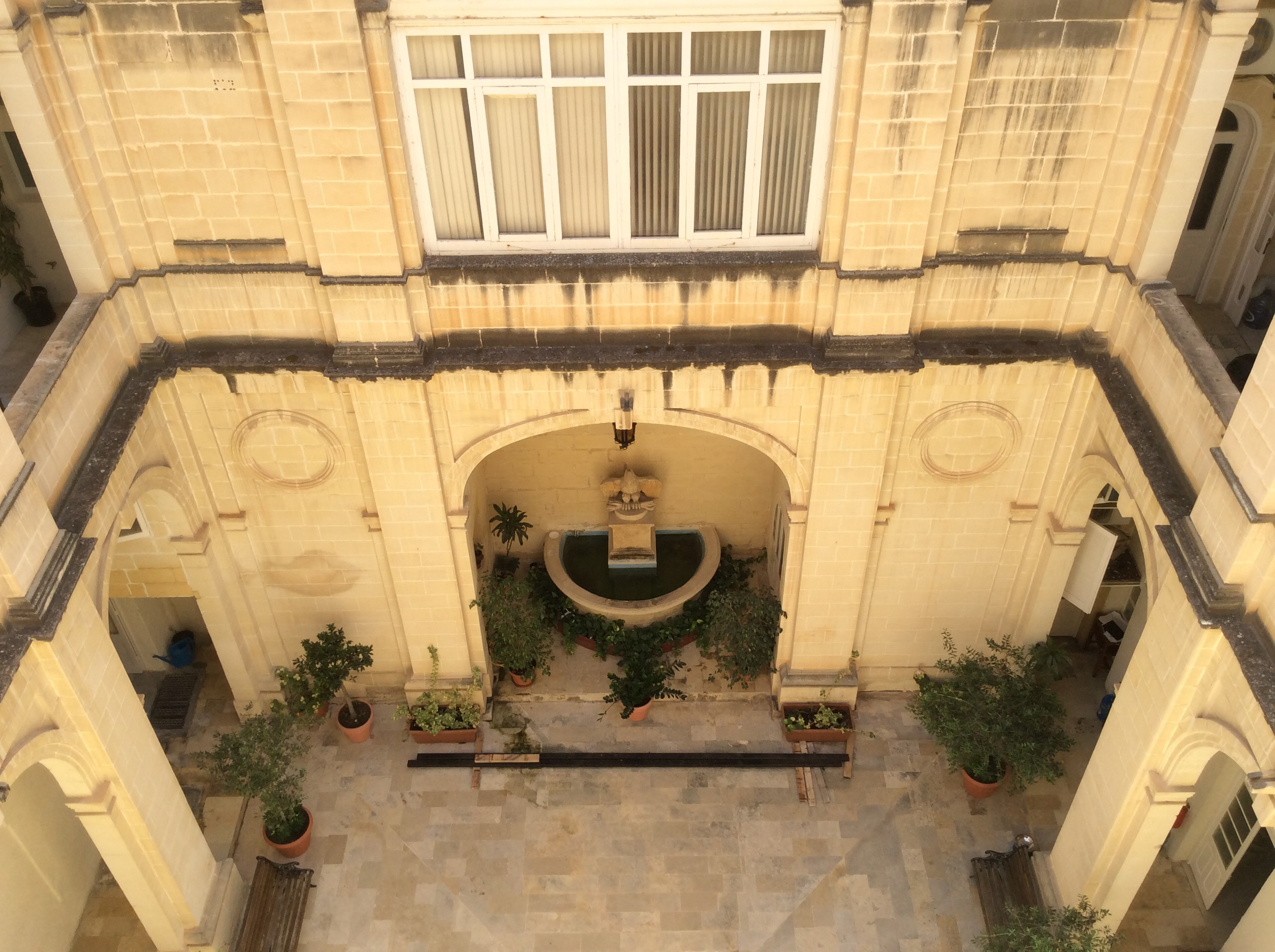
Courtyard
Interior of Palazzo Parisio
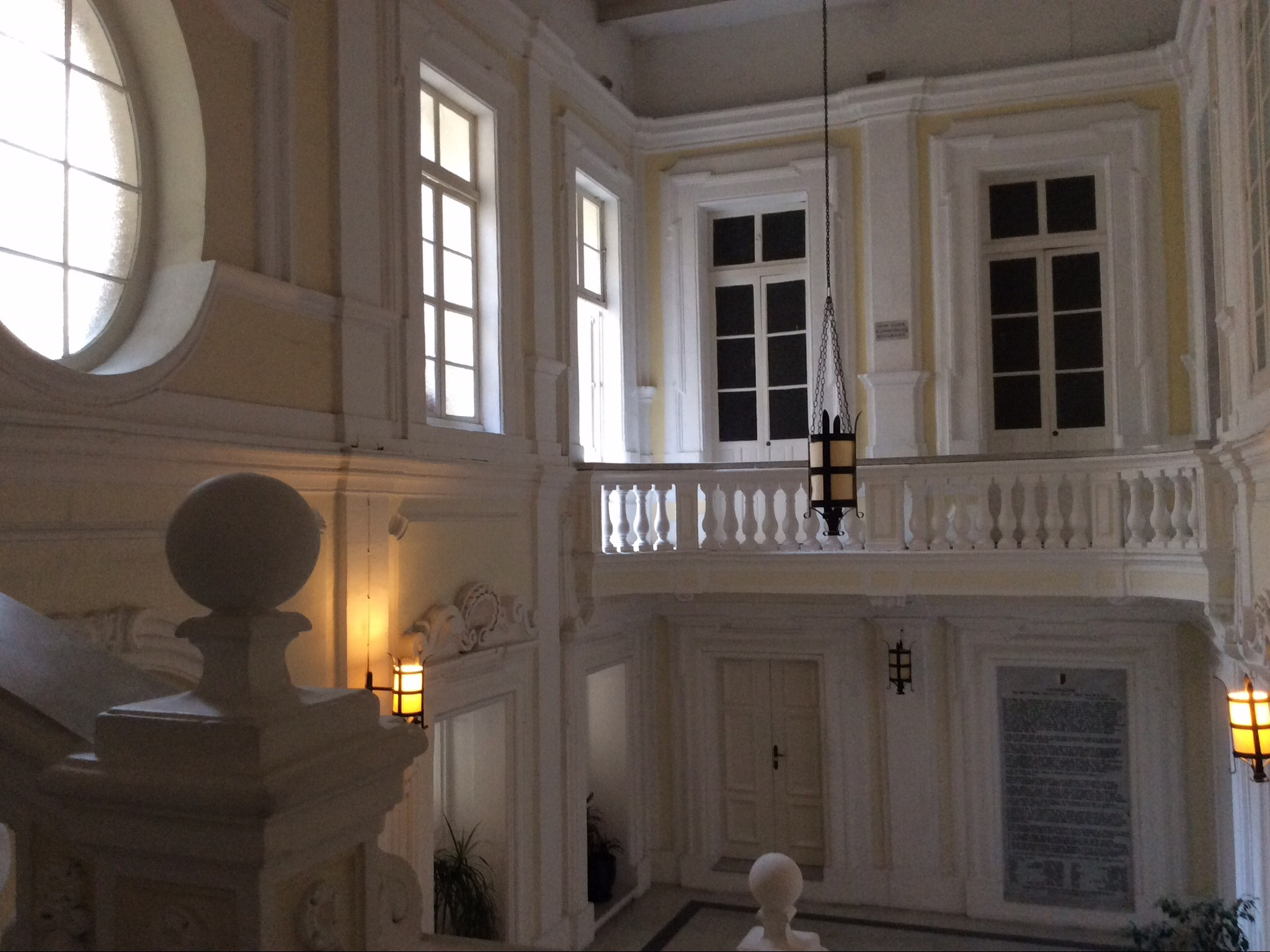
Rustic interior

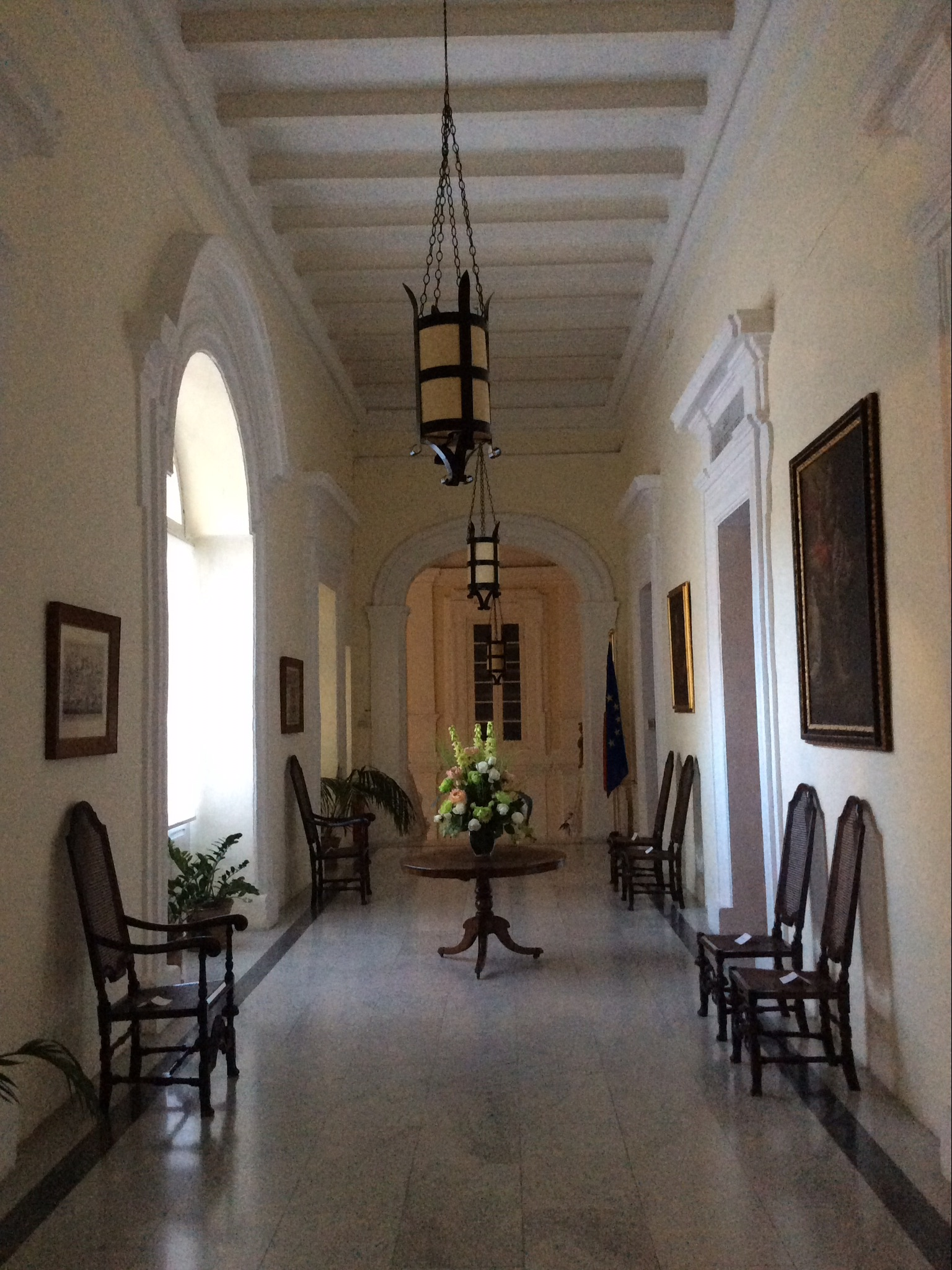
Hallway

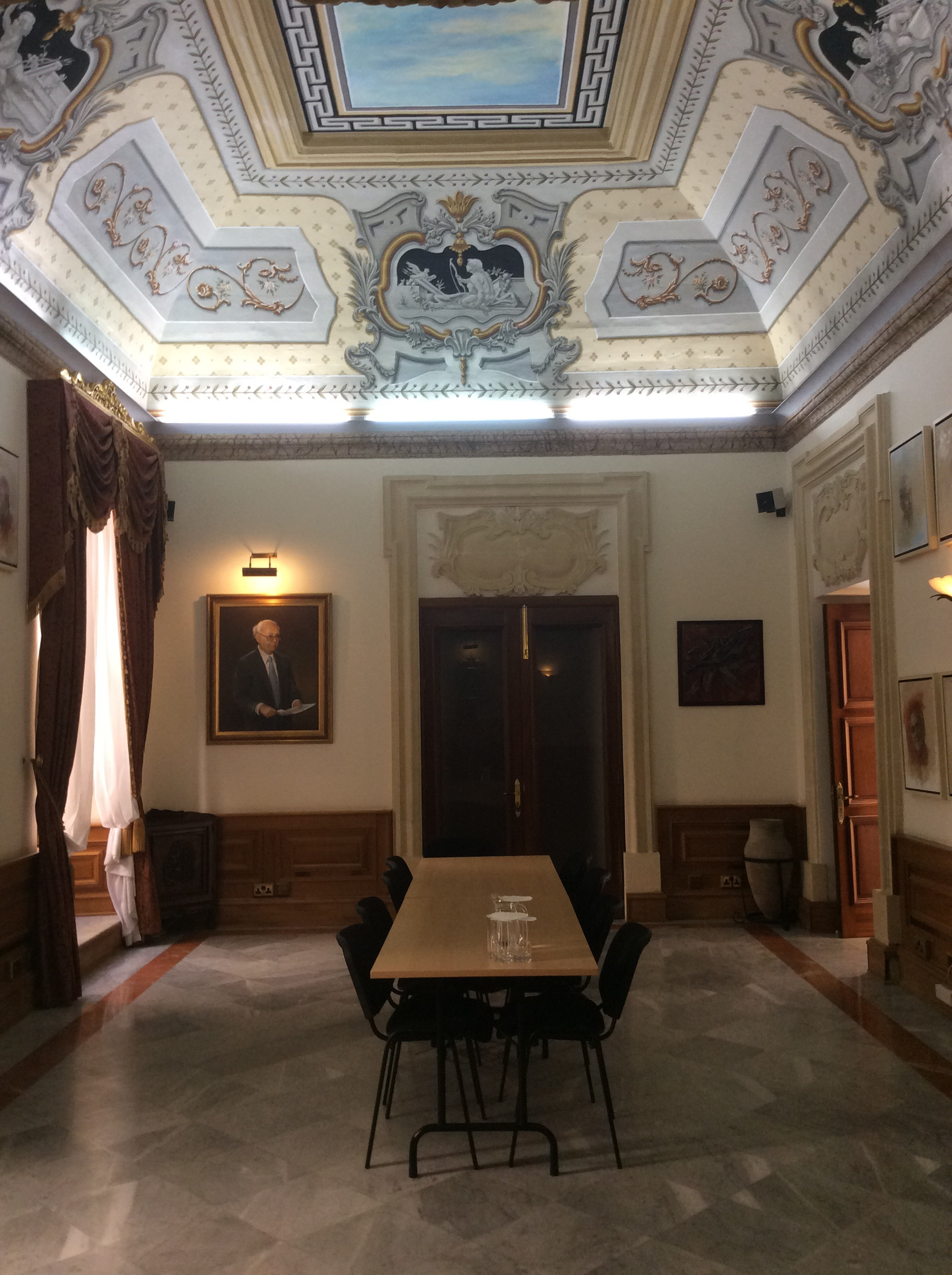
Pardo Hall

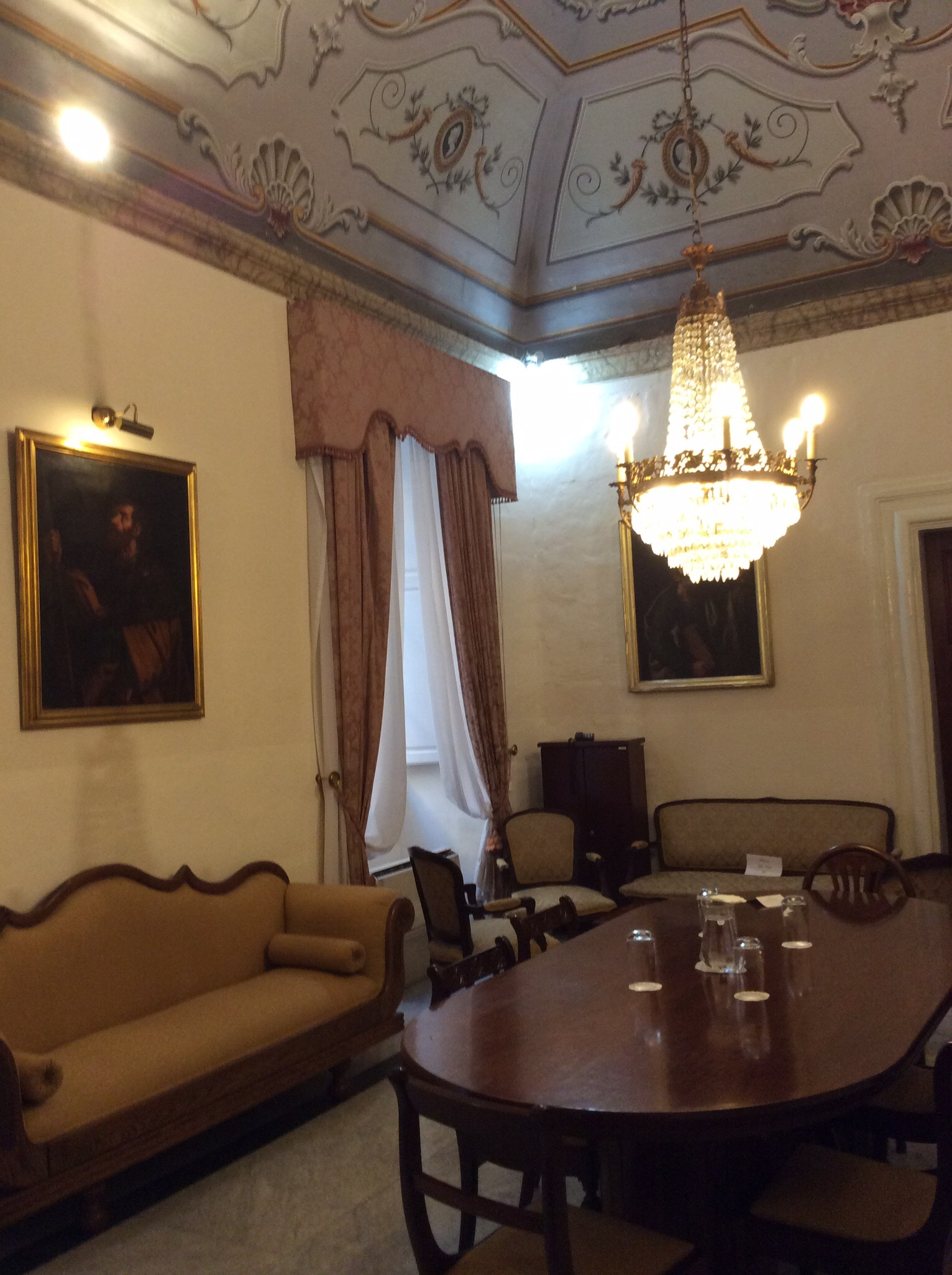
Pardo Hall

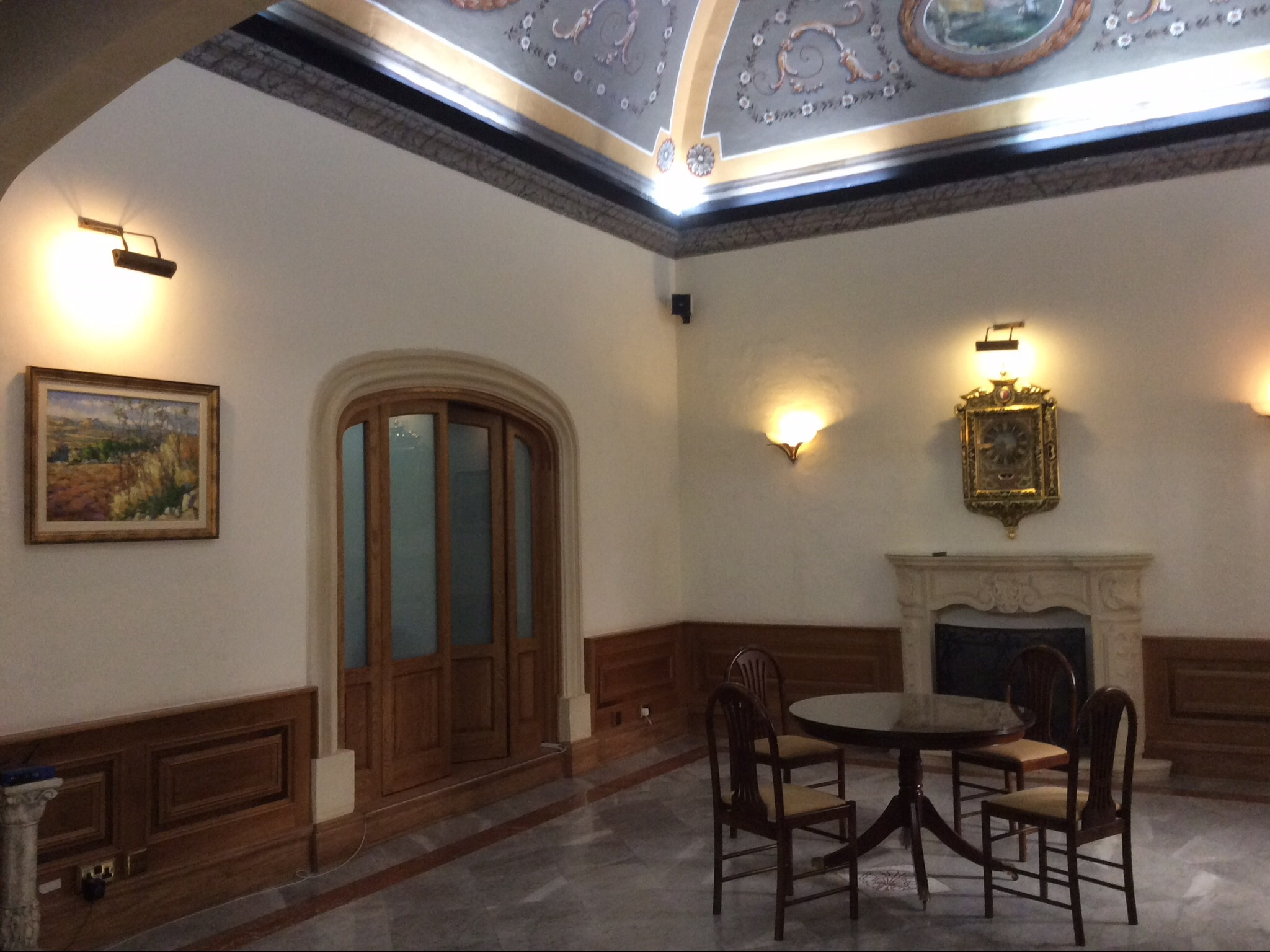
Pardo Hall

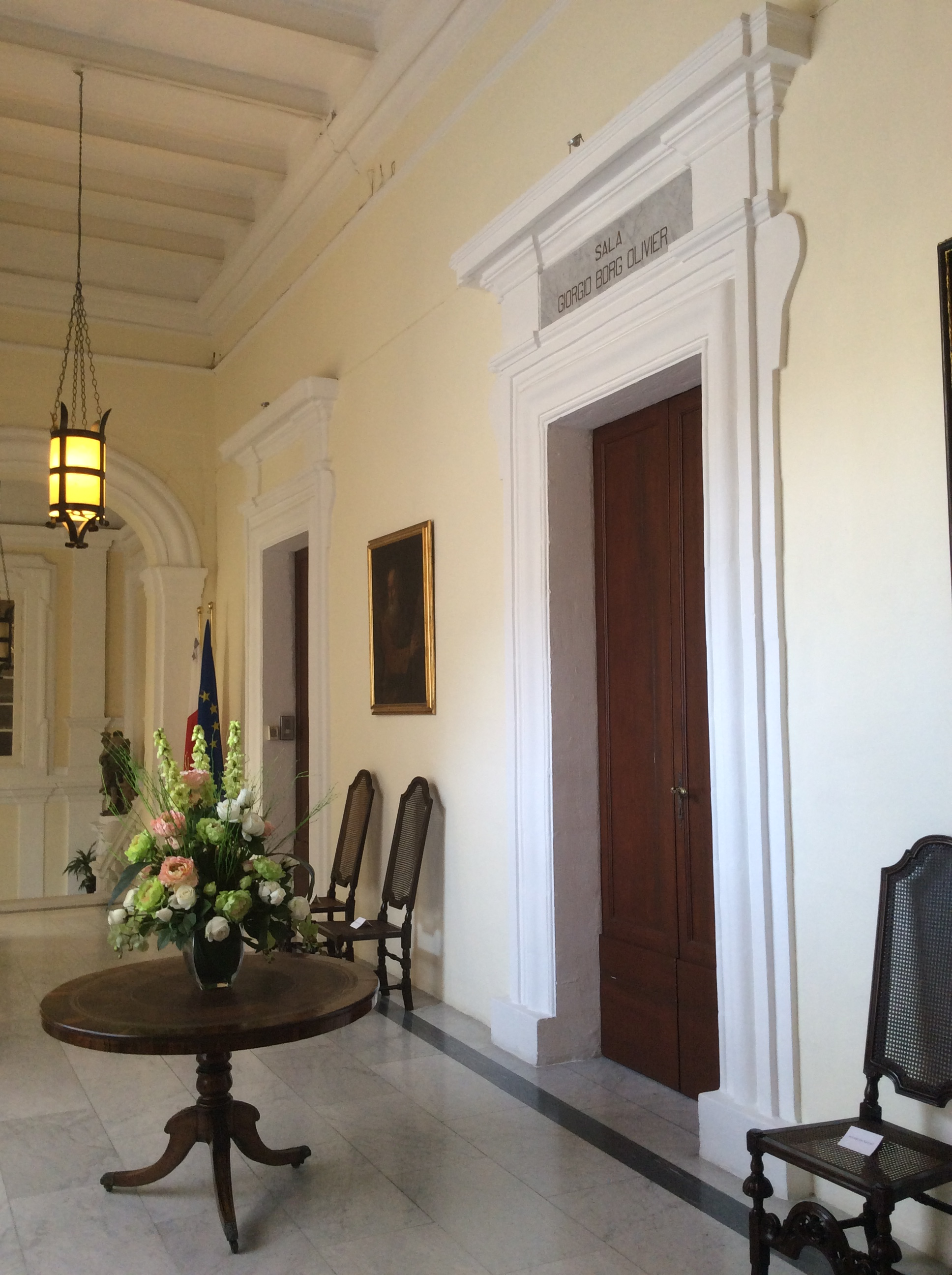
Entry to Sala Giorgio Borg Olivier

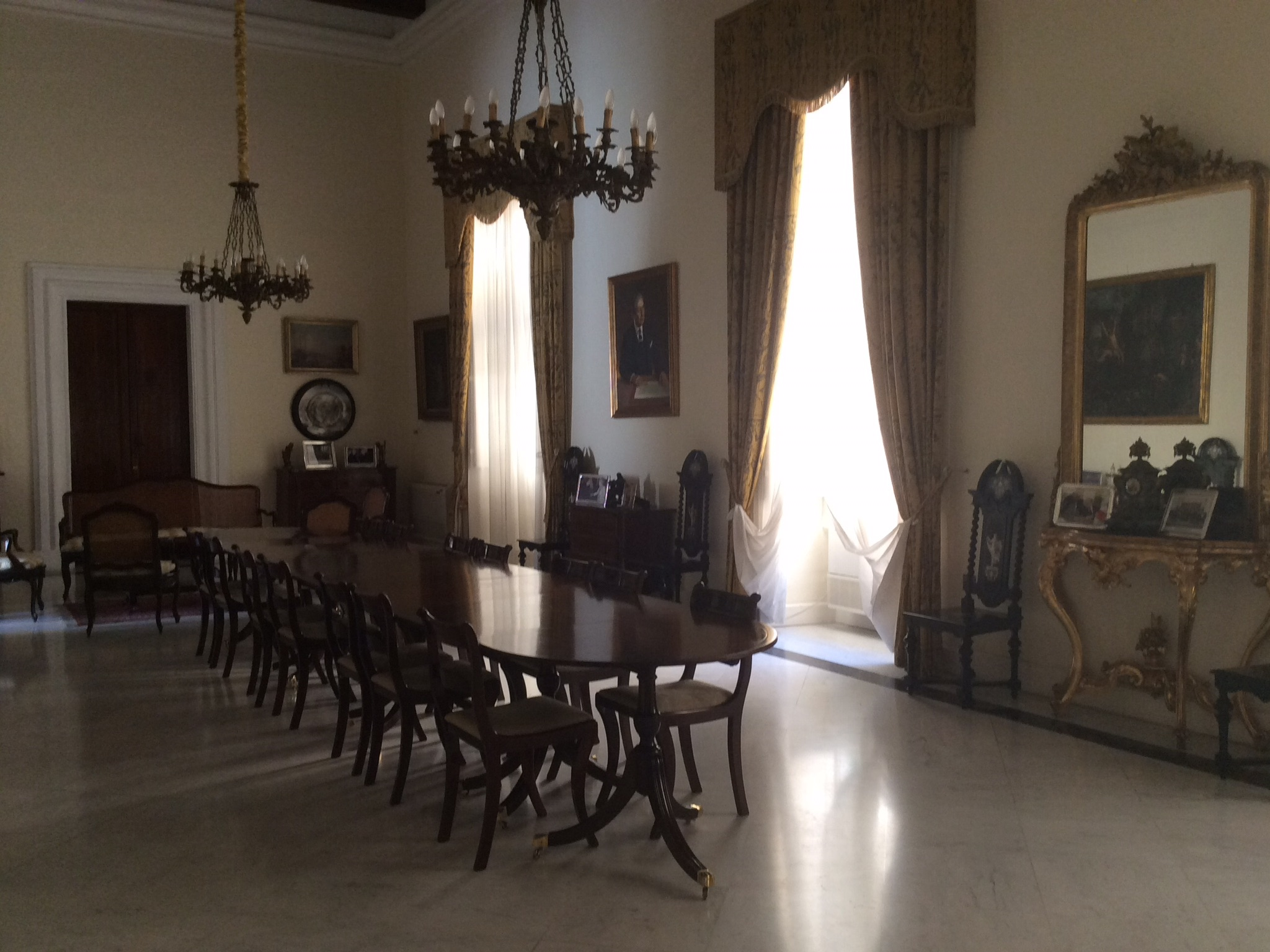
George Borg Olivier Hall

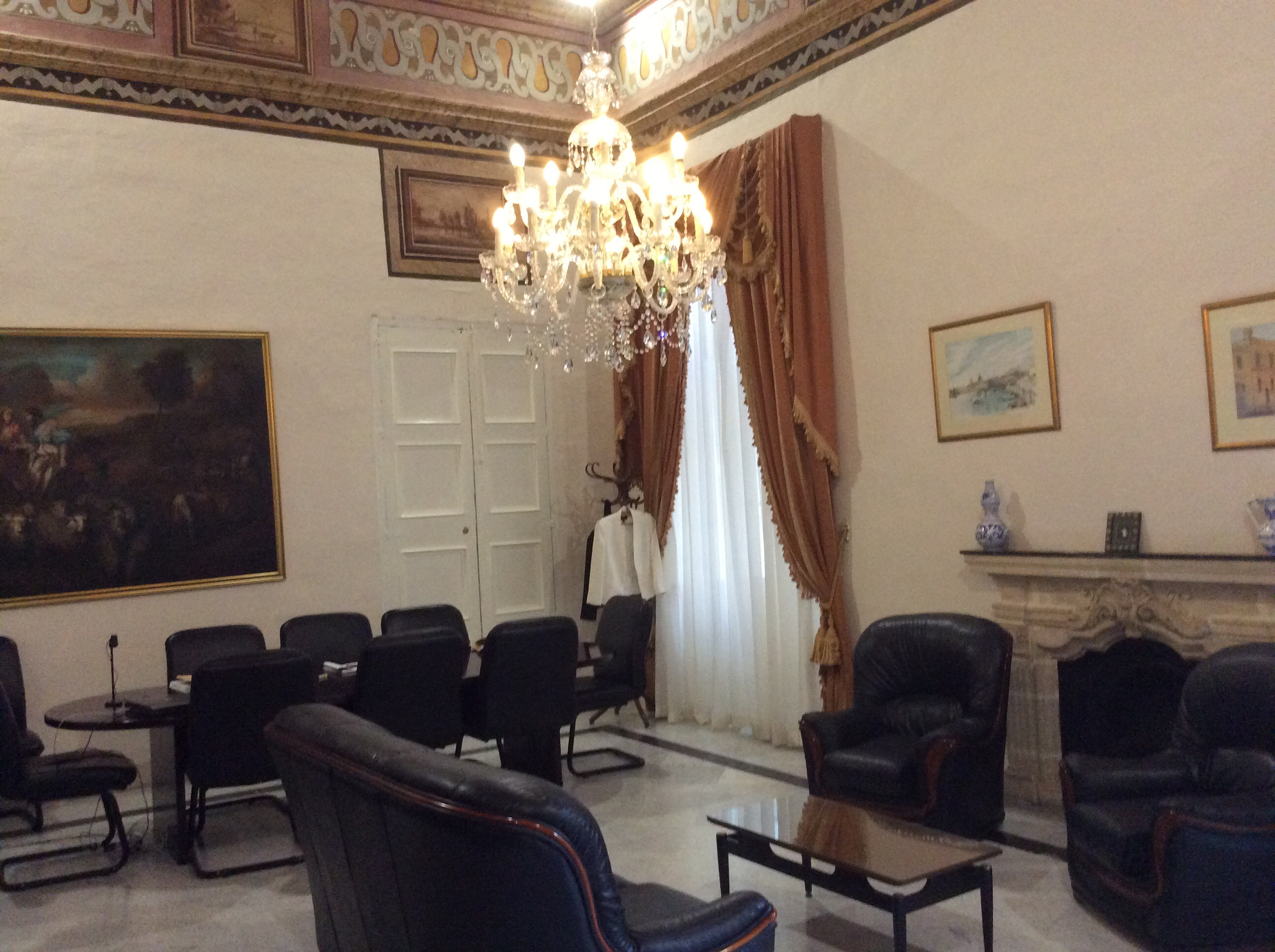
First floor

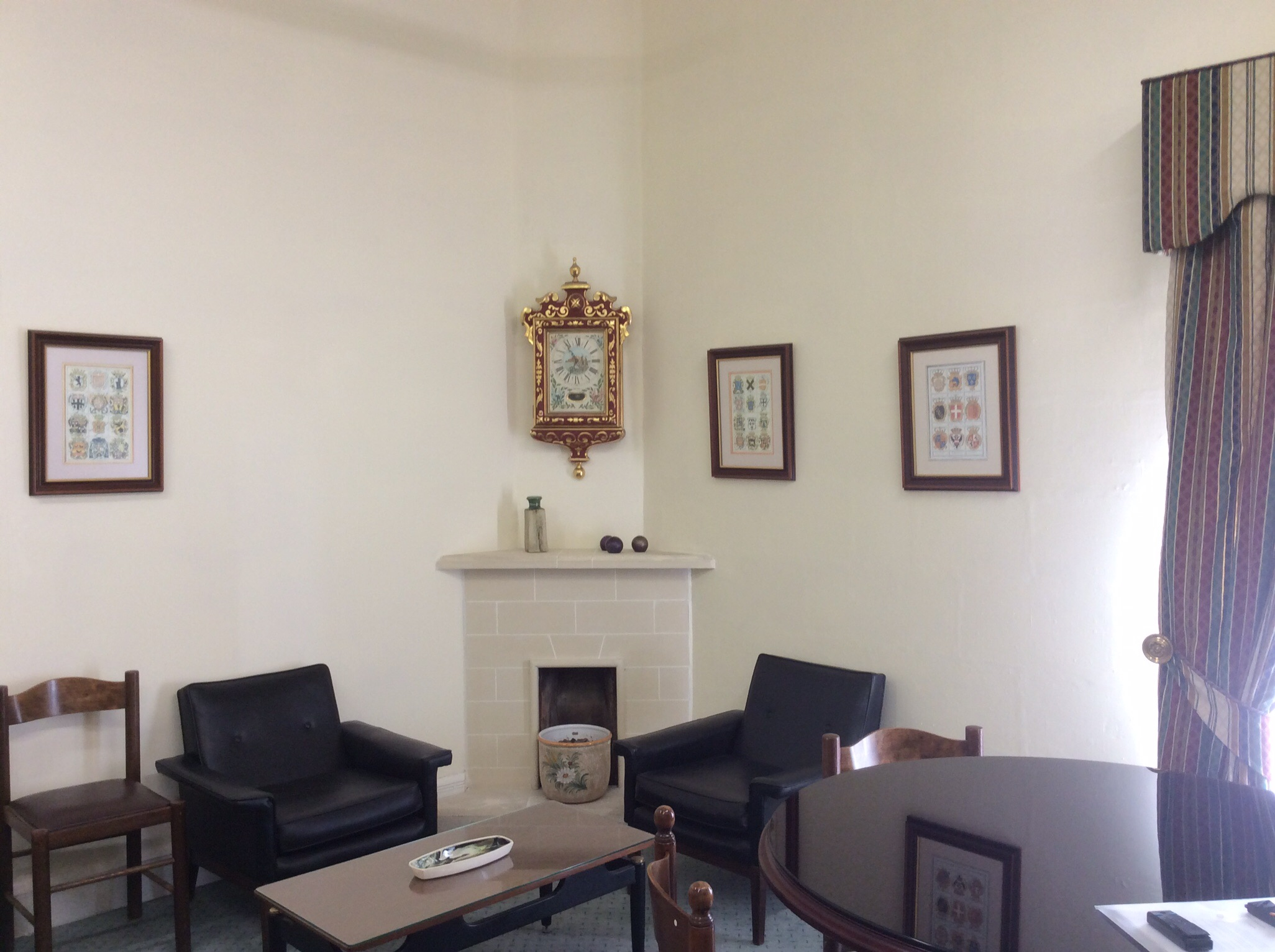
Second floor

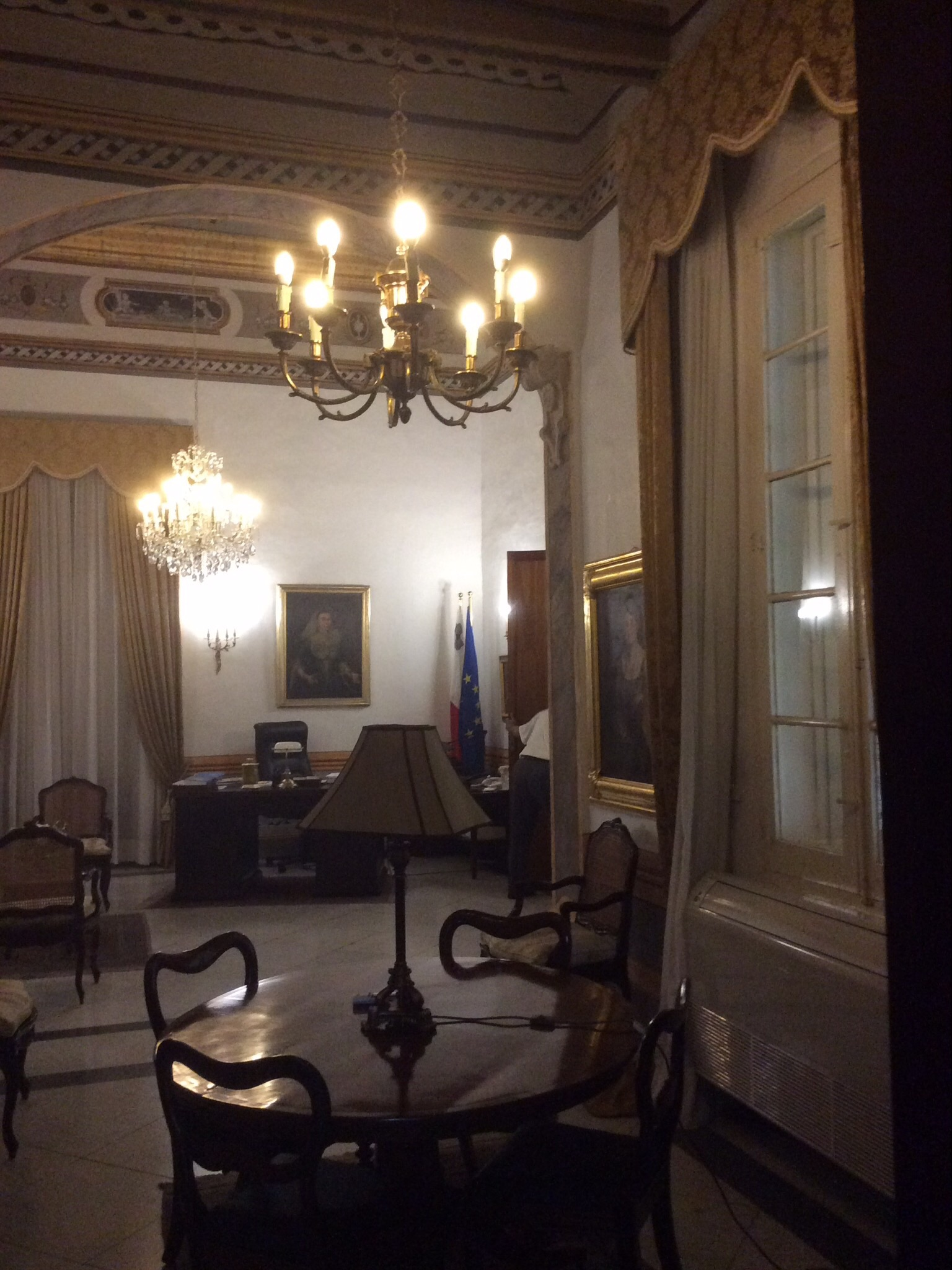
Napoleon's bedroom

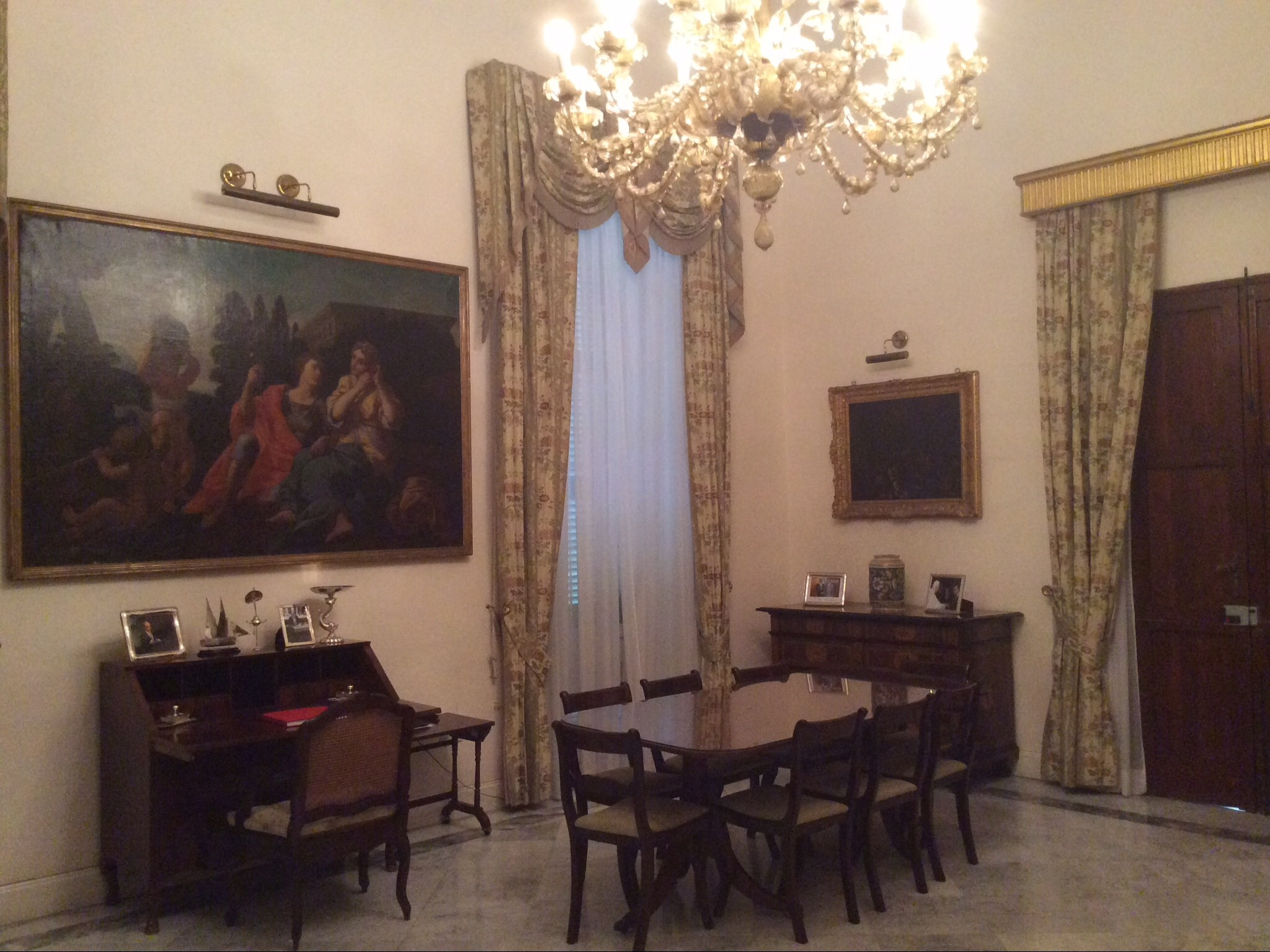
Cabinet where visiting dignitaries sign

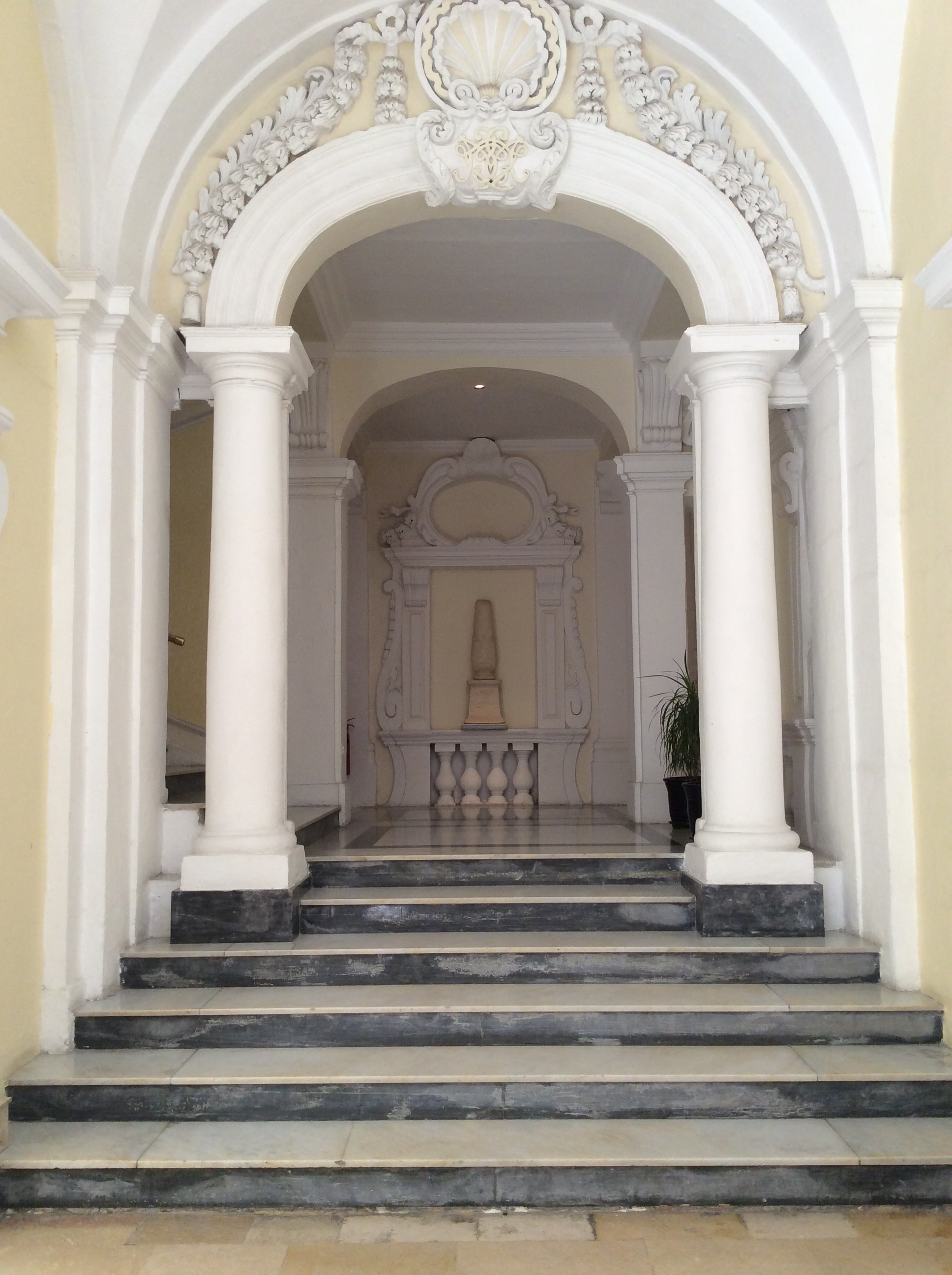
Cippi of Melqart

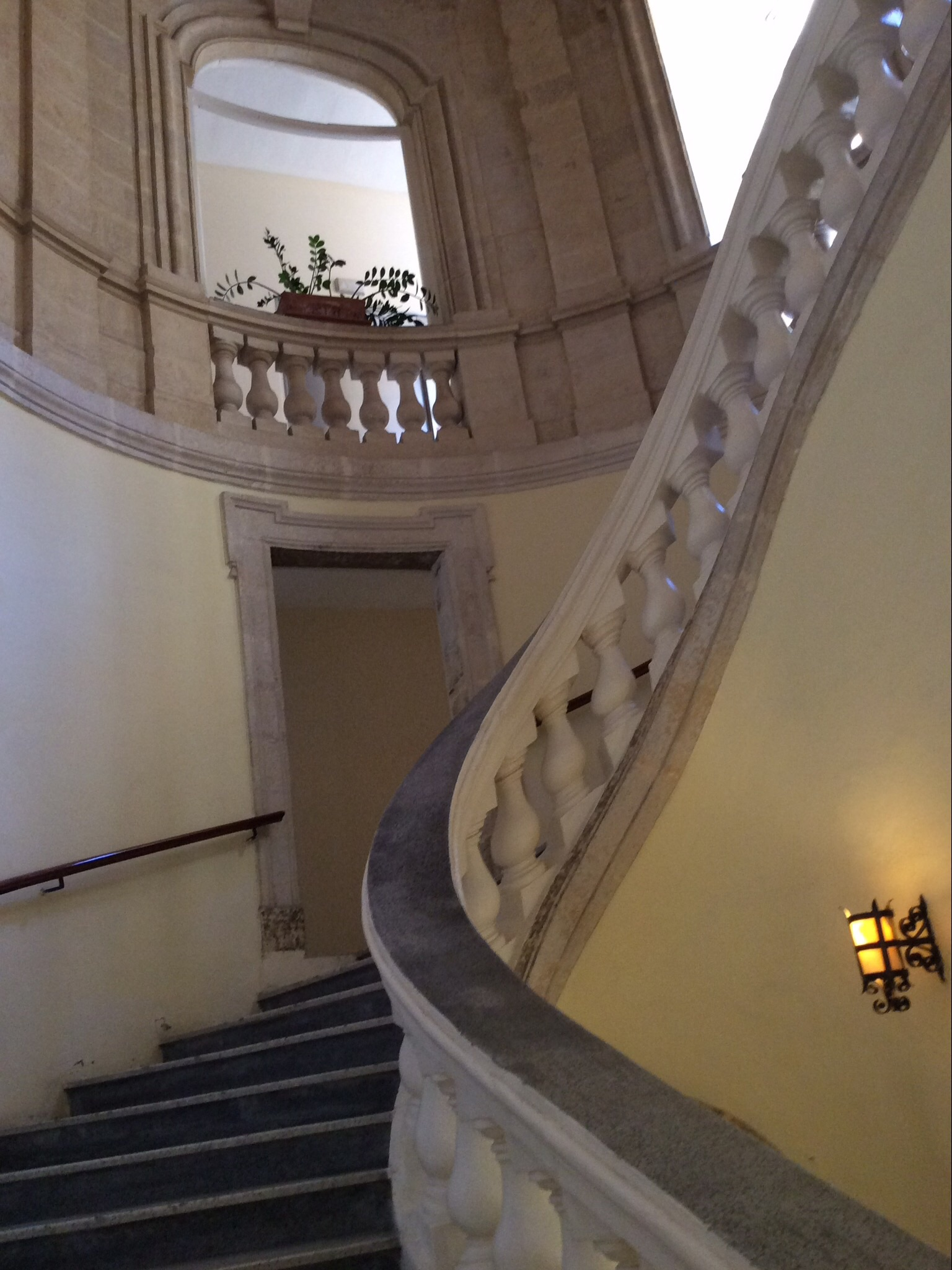
Stairs

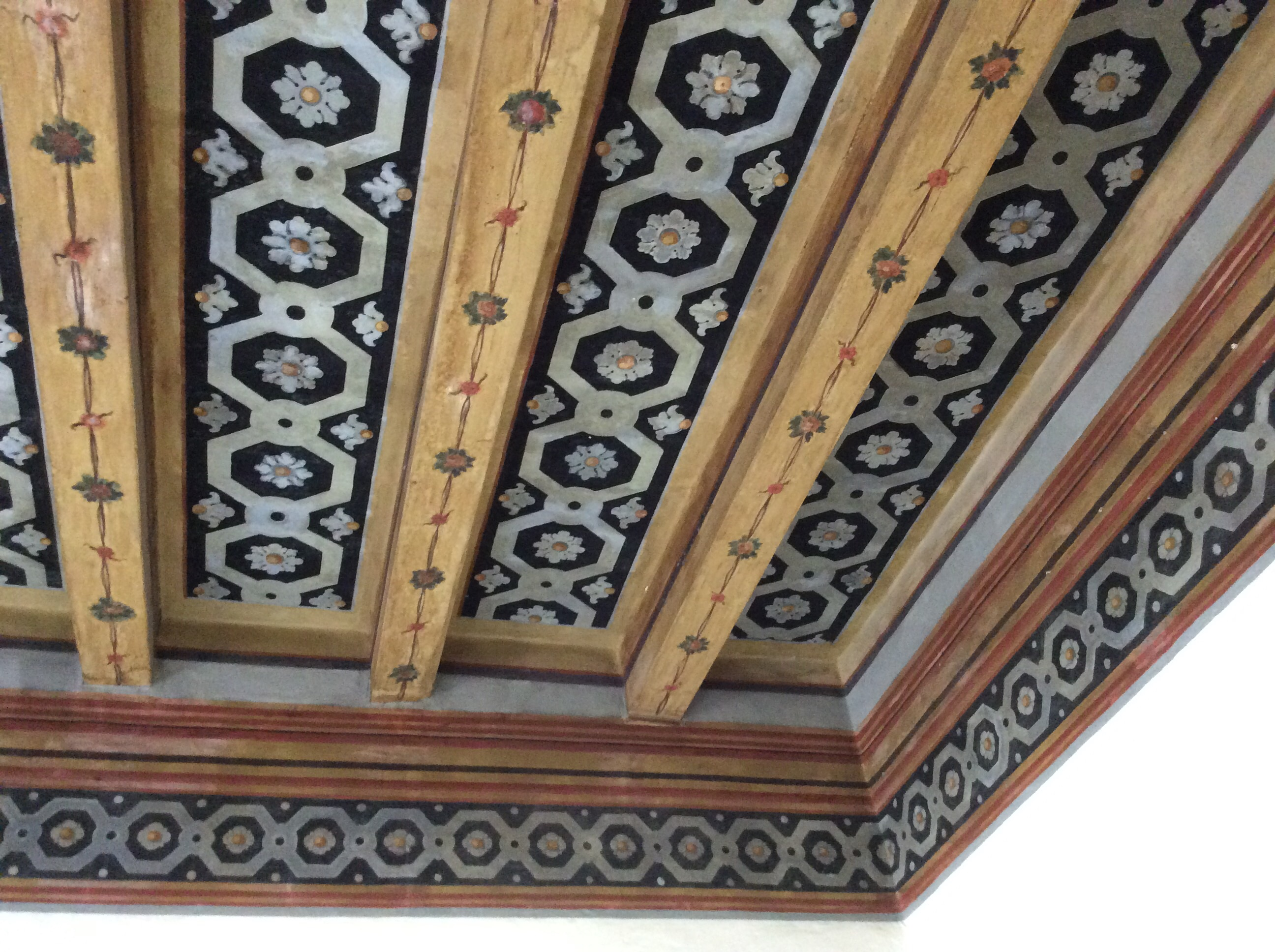
Decorated wooden ceiling beams

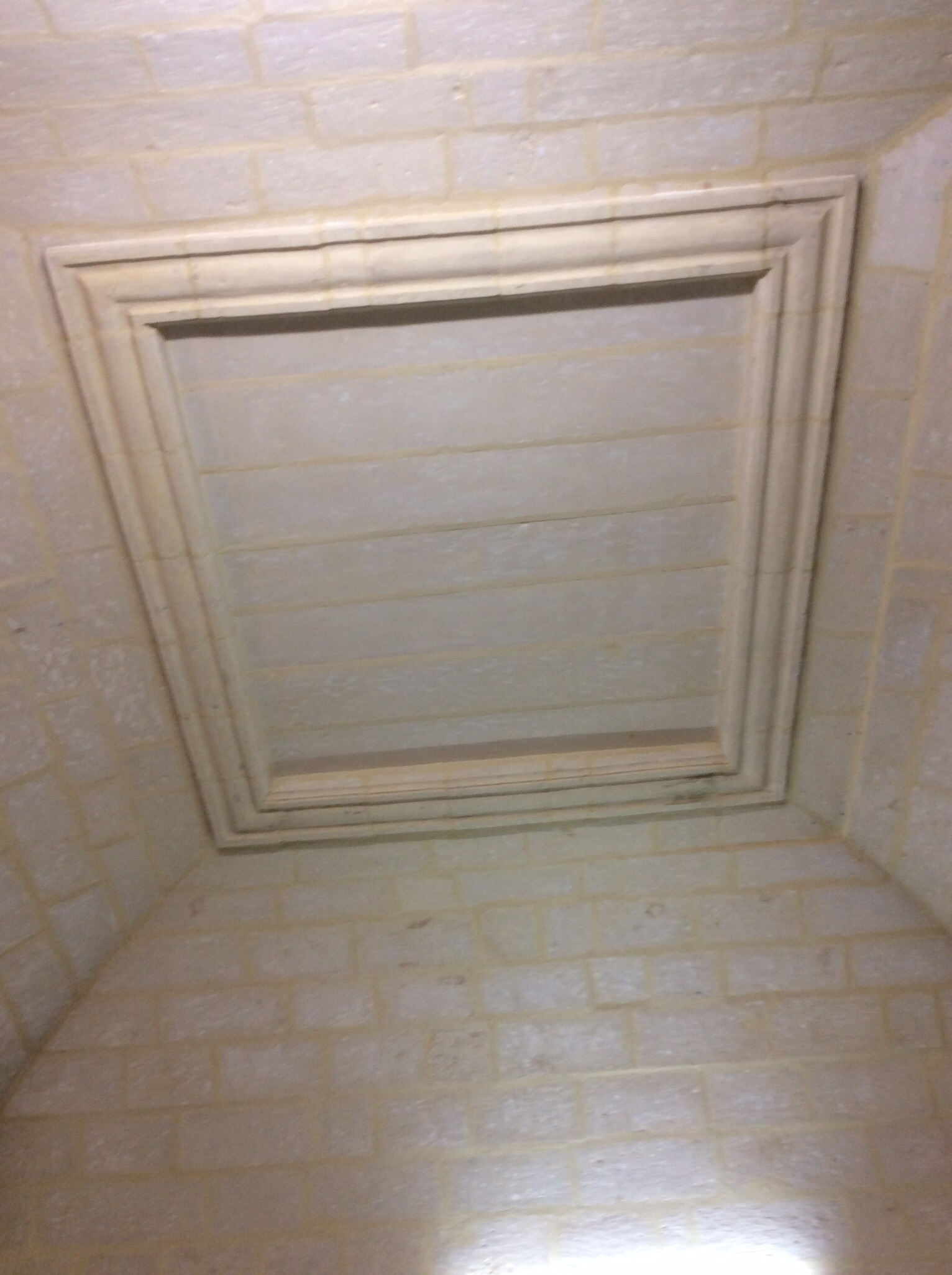
Frescoes lost in World War II

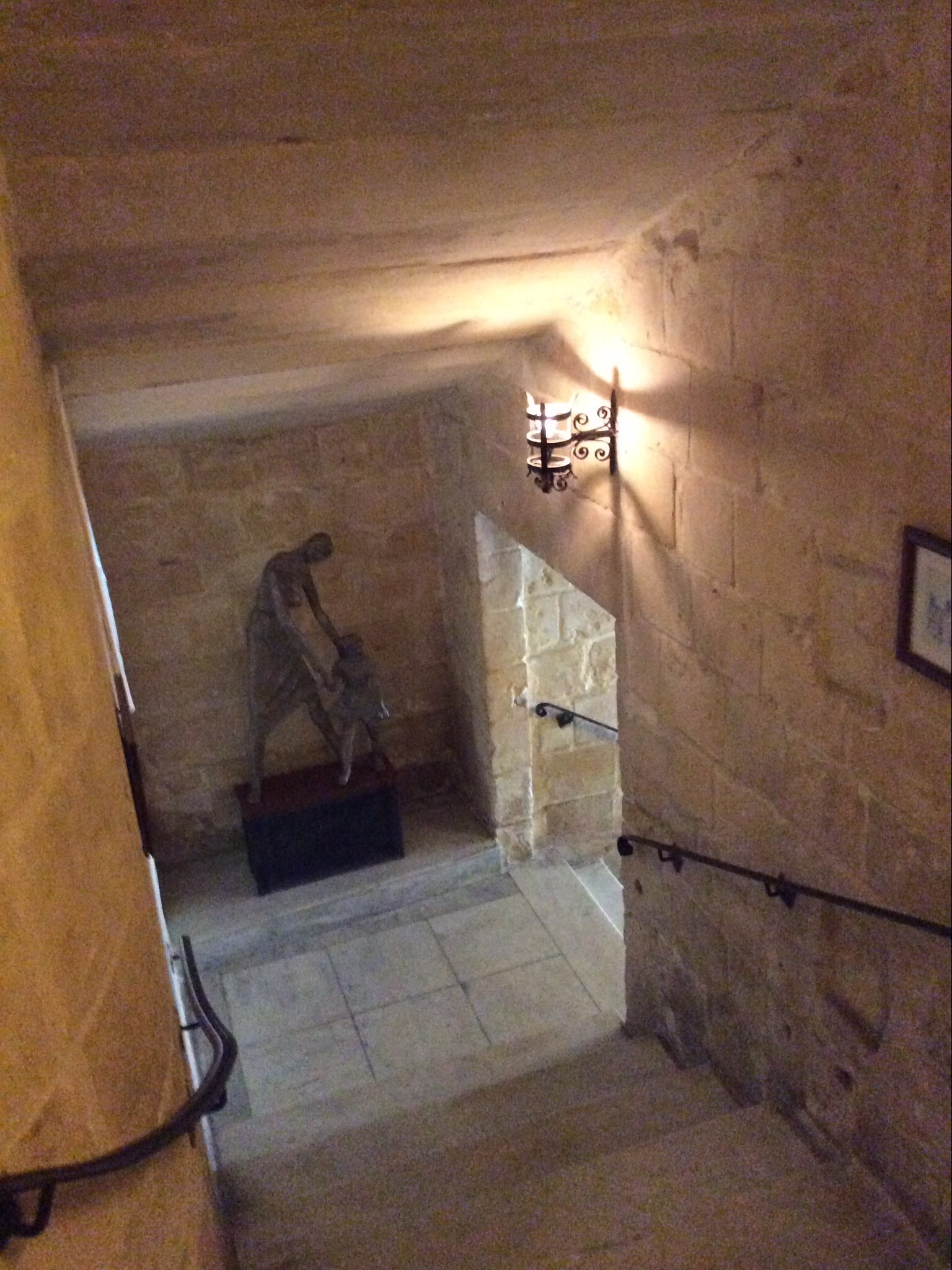
Underground stairs

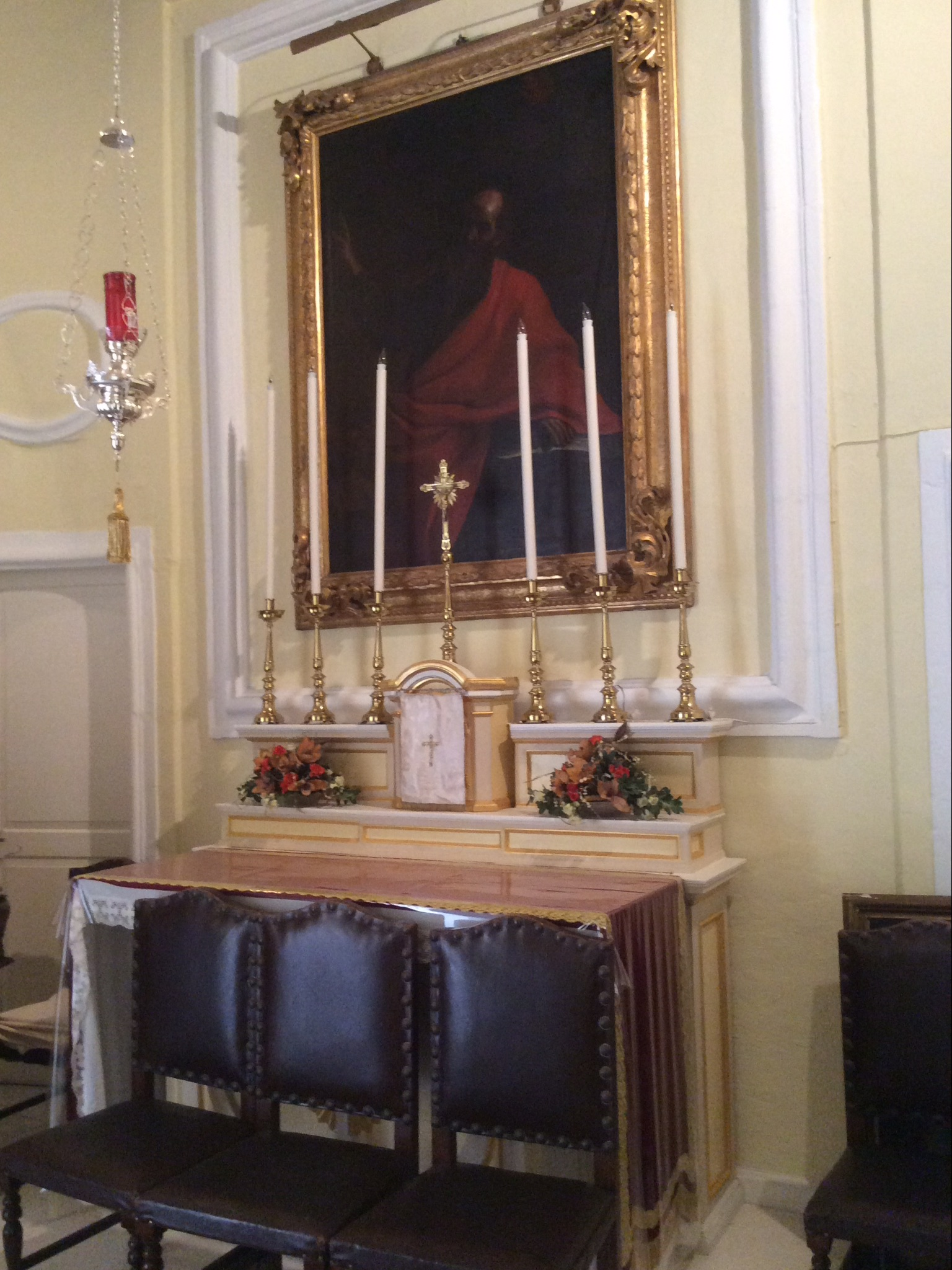
Chapel

== Art ==
The ceilings and walls of the palace have a number of frescoes painted by the Maltese artist Antonaci Grech. Some were destroyed when the palace was bombed in World War II, but others remain in good condition.

A number of paintings are found in the palace; those by the Italian artist Mattia Preti are older than the palace itself.

Frescoes and other artworks in Palazzo Parisio
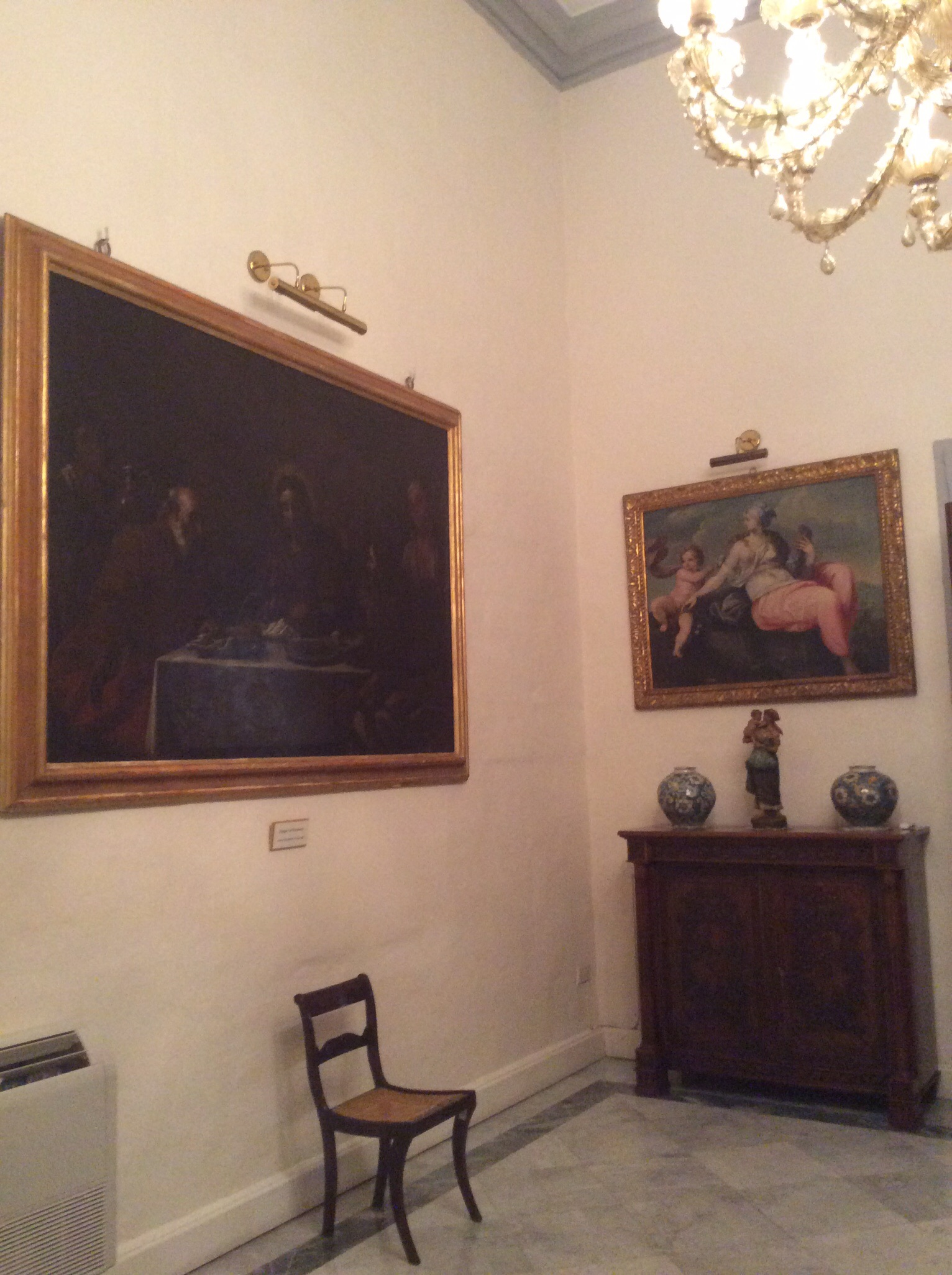
Supper at Emmaus, a c. 1680 painting by Mattia Preti

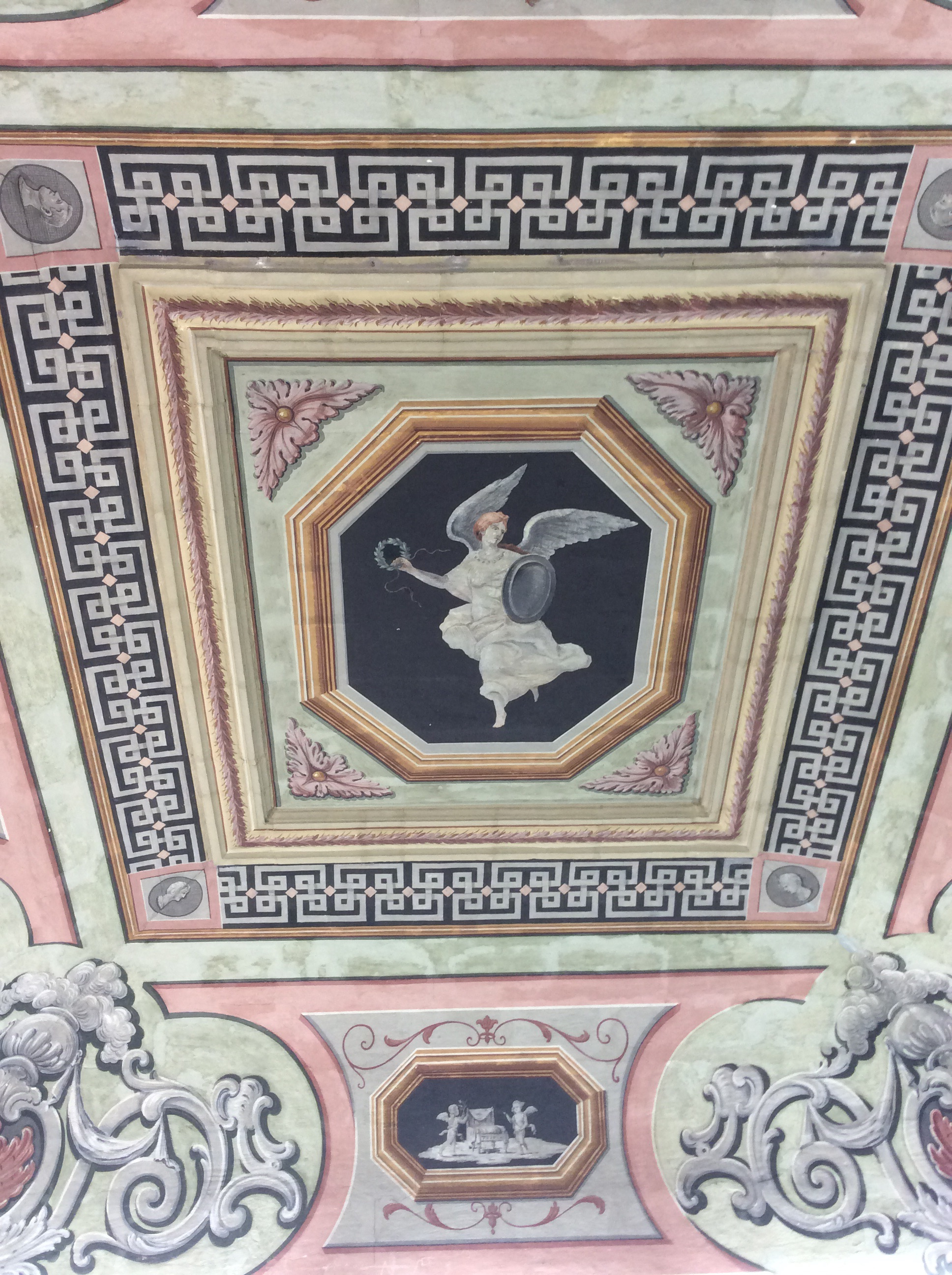
Ceiling fresco

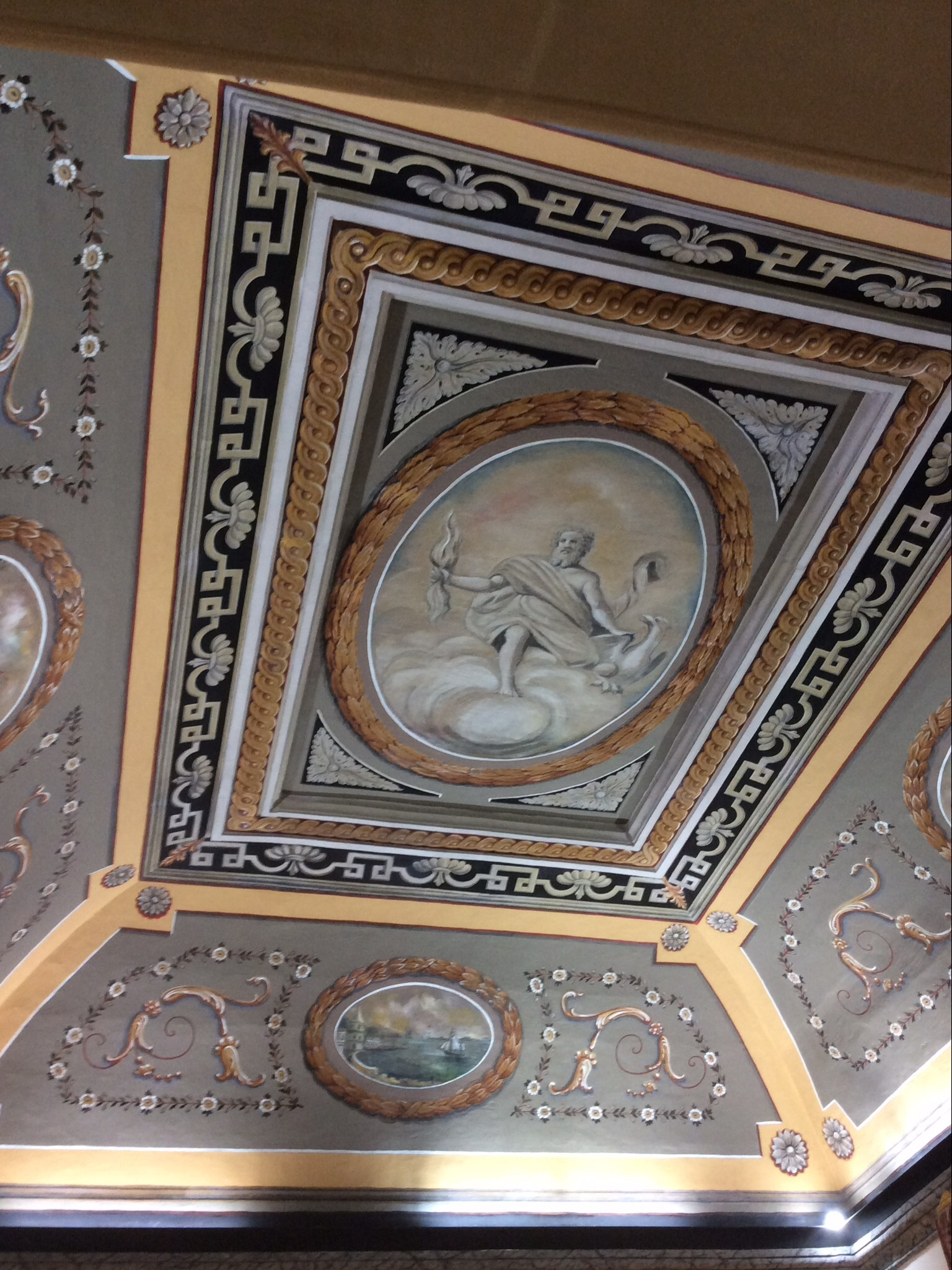
Ceiling fresco

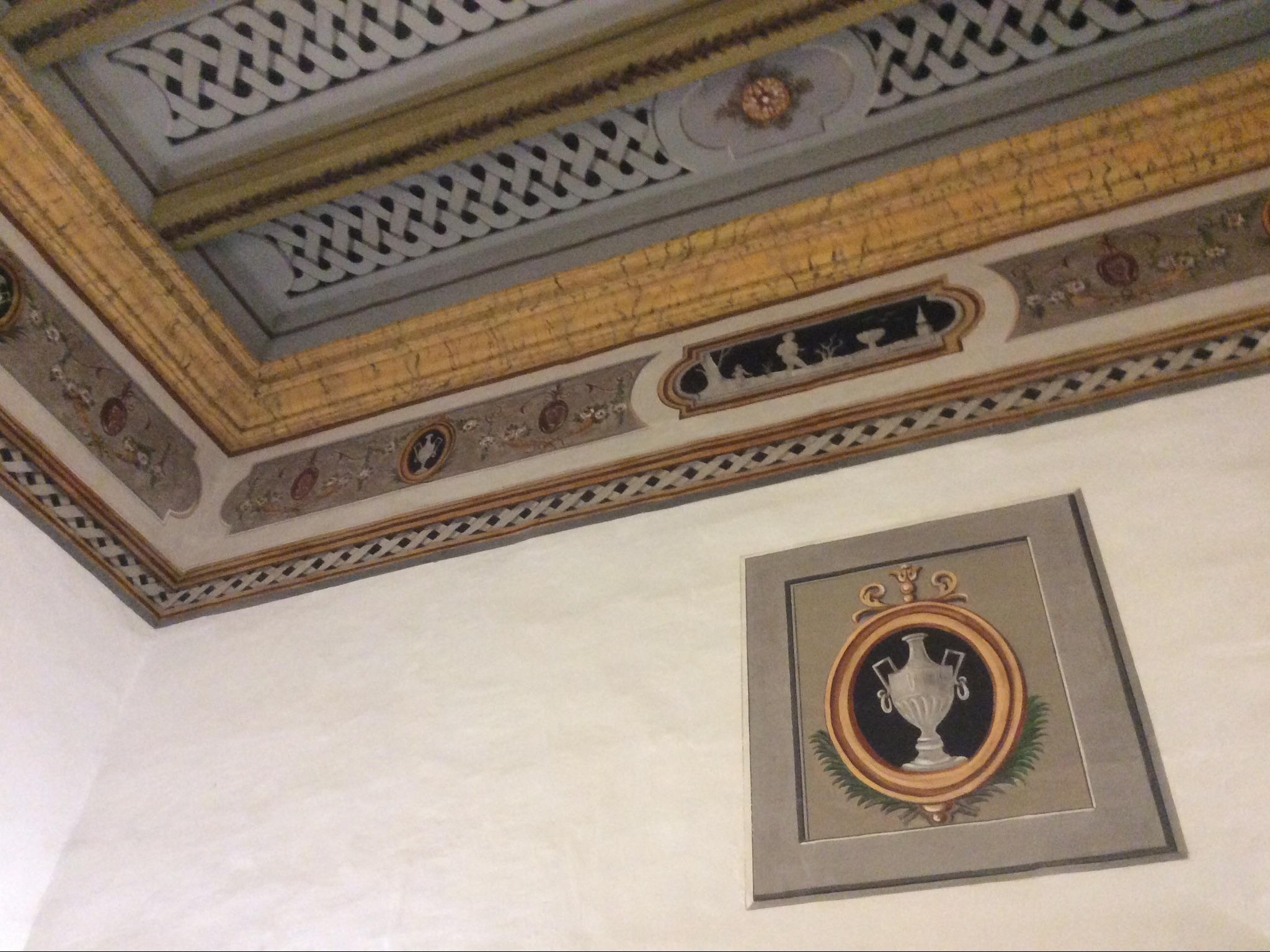
Wall and ceiling frescoes

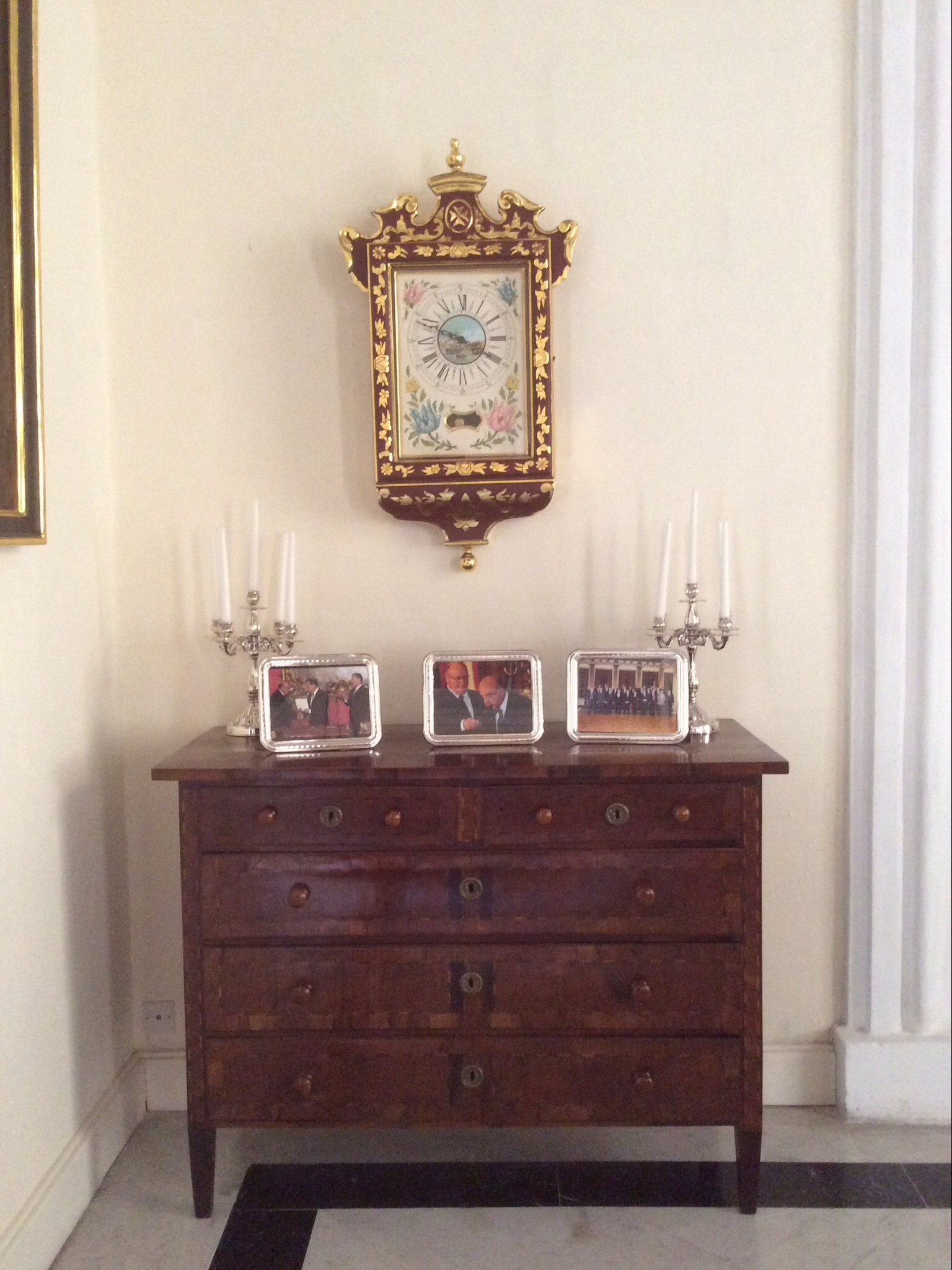
Traditional Maltese clock and cabinet

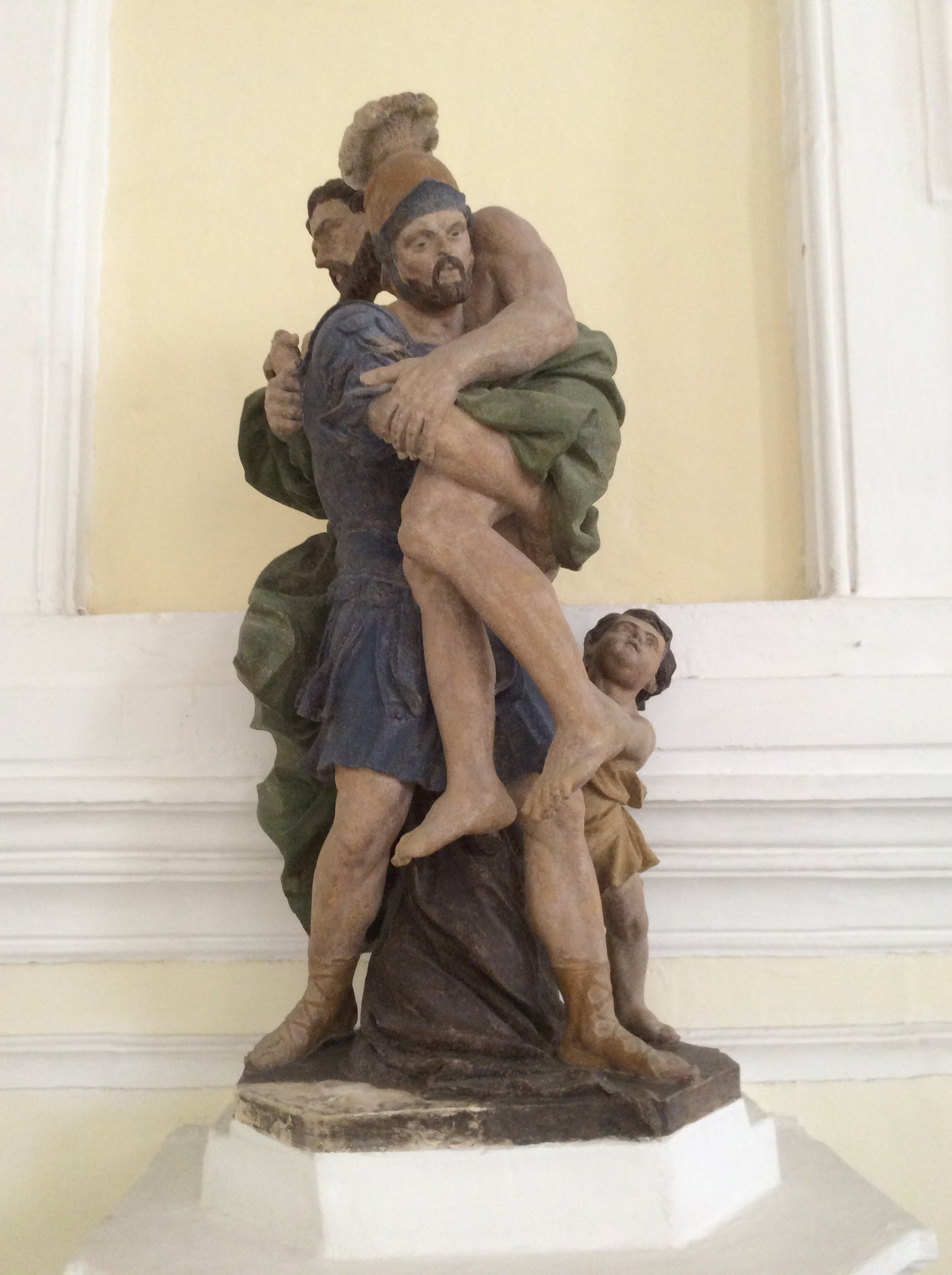
Restored 18th century statue

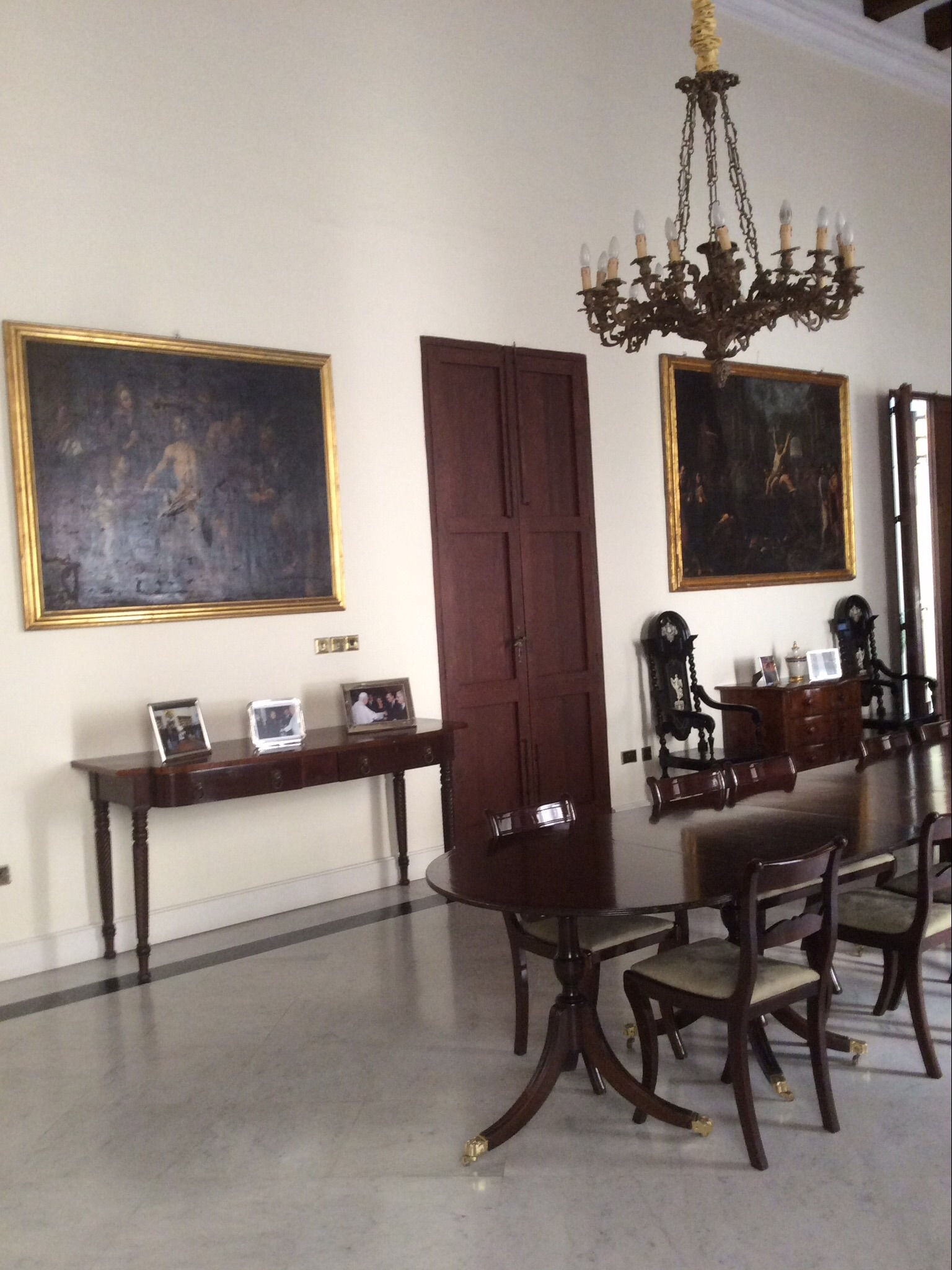
Artworks and furniture at Giorgio Borg Olivier Hall

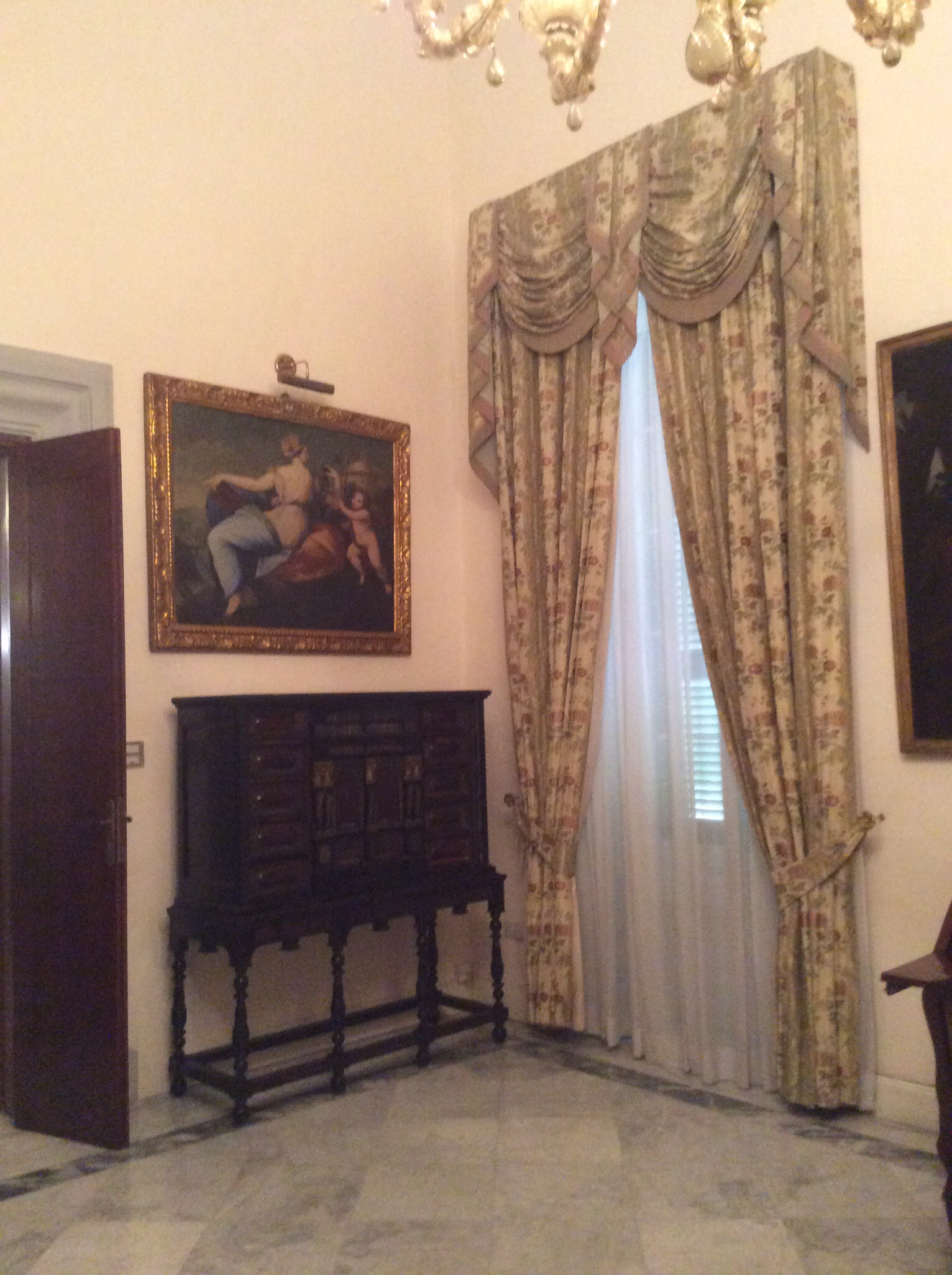
Painting and antique Chinese cabinet

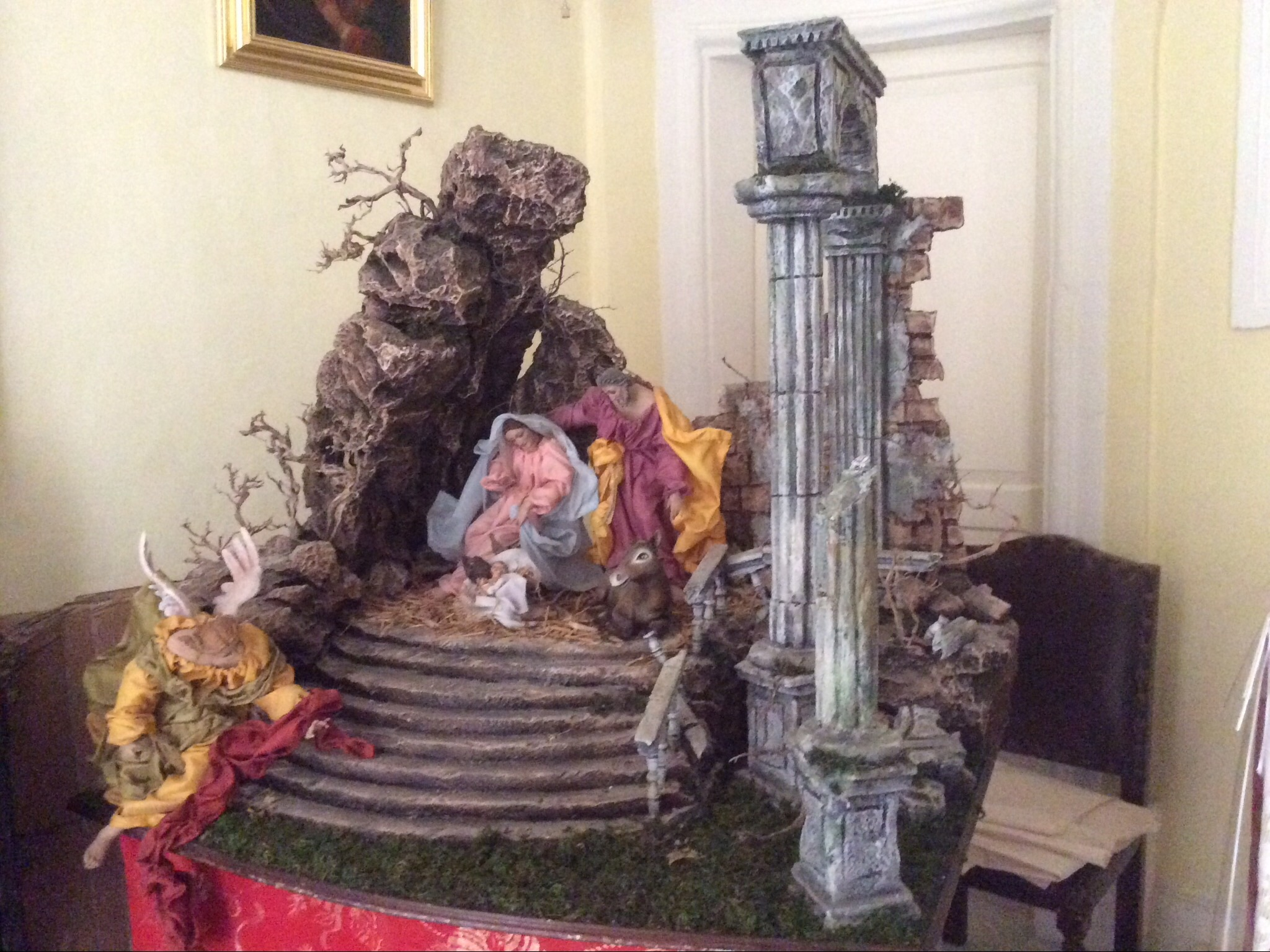
Neapolitan handmade crib

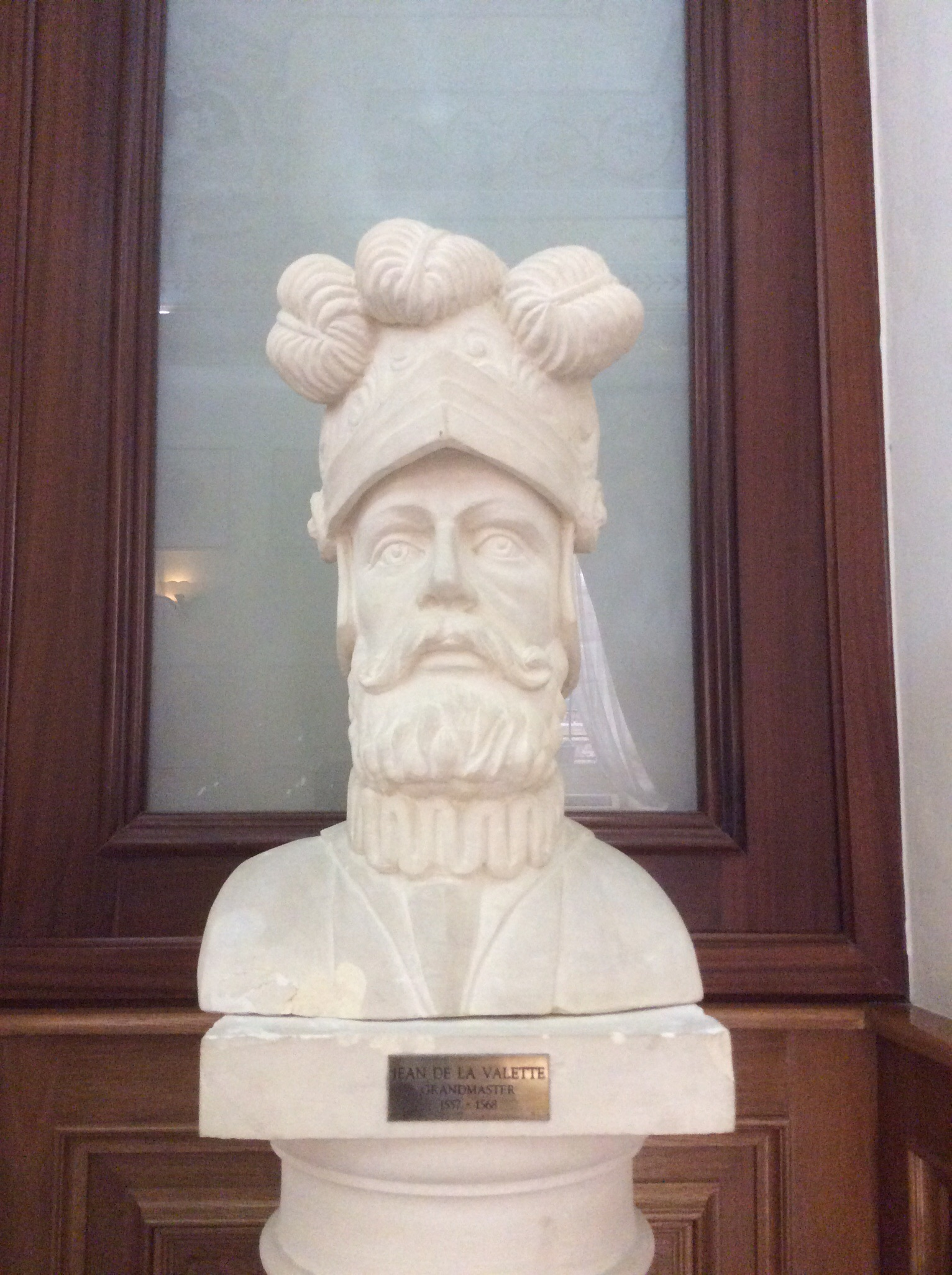
Bust of Jean de Valette

== See also ==
- Palazzo Parisio (Naxxar)
- Villa Parisio
