= Mary de Piro =

Maltese artist

Mary de Piro is a Maltese artist (born in Valletta, 1946).

She studied art at a young age while at boarding school at Badia a Ripoli in Florence and later at the Accademia di Belle Arti di Firenze. Her first exhibition was held in Wisconsin, in the course of a stay in the United States. Her first solo exhibition in Malta brought her critical acclaim owing to the confidence of her brushwork and choice of large format canvases. This led to commissions from corporate patrons, through curator Richard England. In 1975 she moved to the UK, where she raised a family while continuing to paint, moving into the field of portraiture and sacred art. Over the years she mainly participated in collective exhibitions in the England, Malta, and Italy. Mary de Piro is best known for her landscape paintings, particularly those which evoke the Mediterranean light of the Maltese countryside.

== Exhibitions ==
Personal exhibitions

- 1968 La Grande Italia, Boston Store, Milwaukee, Wisconsin, United States
- 1969 Mazaron Gallery, Paceville, Malta
- 1971 National Museum, Auberge de Provence, Valletta, Malta
- 1975 Nails Cellars Gallery, Devon, England
- 1977 ‘Window on Mary de Piro’, National Museum of Fine Arts, Valletta, Malta
- 2005 Mary de Piro (duo exhibition), Casino Maltese, Valletta, Malta
- 2014 Palazzo de Piro, Mdina, Malta
- 2016 Bank of Valletta Head Office, Malta

Collective

- 1967 Bank of Alderney Art Gallery, Valletta
- 1967 National Museum of Malta, Valletta, Malta
- 1969 Biennale Internazionale di Pittura Contemporanea, Pistoia, Italy
- 1969 Sacred Art Exhibition, St John's Co-Cathedral, Valletta; The cathedral, Mdina, Malta
- 1970 The Permanent Art Gallery, MSAMC, Palazzo de La Salle, Valletta
- 1970 Mazaron Art Gallery, Paceville, Malta
- 1970 ‘Art from Malta’, Richard Demarco Gallery, Edinburgh, Scotland
- 1970 River Oaks Gallery, Houston, Texas, United States
- 1973 Barclays Bank Art Exhibition, Barclays Bank, Kingsway, Valletta, Malta
- 1973 Malta Government Tourist Board, Vienna, Austria
- 1982 ‘Maltese Women Artists’, Gallerija Fenici, Valletta, Malta
- 1989 ‘Artisti Maltesi a Firenze’, Galleria Renzo Spagnoli Arte, Florence, Italy
- 1994 ‘European Art’, Chamber of Commerce, Valletta, Malta
- 1994 ‘Wardour Chapel Appeal’, Christie's, London, U.K.
- 1996 Sacred Art Biennale, Cathedral Museum, Mdina, Malta
- 1997 - ‘Art for Youth’, Mall Galleries, London, U.K.
- 1998 ‘Charity Art’, Holy Trinity Brompton, London, U.K.
- 2000 ‘Maltese Talents Abroad’, National Museum of Fine Arts, Valletta, Malta
- 2004 ‘Drawn into the Light’, Contemporary Christian Art Exhibition, Wapping, London
- 2008 ‘Bloodline’, Gallery G, Lija, Malta
- 2008 ‘malta4euro’, European Commission Representation, London, U.K.
- 2008 ‘Mediterraneo: A Sea that unites’, Italian Cultural Institute, London, U.K.
- 2008 - 2015 Annual Exhibition, Hurlingham Club, London, England

== External sources ==
- Personal website
