= Vincenzo Dimech =

Maltese sculptor (1768–1831)

- Born: 29 June 1768; Valletta, Hospitaller Malta
- Died: 2 February 1831 (aged 62); Valletta, Crown Colony of Malta
- Burial place: Church of St. Theresa, Cospicua
- Education: Scuola delle Belle Arte, Naples
- Occupation: Sculptor
- Notable work: Titular statue of St. Mary, Gudja (1807); Titular statue of St. Publius, Floriana (1811); Monument to Sir Joseph Nicholas Zammit, Valletta (1824)
- Spouse: Saveria Mathea de Muso (m. 1802)
- Children: Sigismondo Dimech
- Parents: Francesco Dimech (father); Siniforosa Dimech née Pace (mother)

Vincenzo Dimech (29 June 1768 – 2 February 1831) was a Maltese sculptor. He is best known for his religious sculptures, which include the titular statues of Gudja and Floriana. He also sculpted monuments or architectural features in Valletta and Corfu.

== Biography ==
Dimech was born in Valletta on 29 June 1768, as the son of Francesco Dimech and his wife Siniforosa née Pace. He was baptized at the Porto Salvo Church. Dimech was the cousin of Mariano Gerada, another sculptor. At a young age, he learnt about design and sculpture at his father's studio. He later studied at the Scuola delle Belle Arte in Naples.

By around 1806, he was a professor of Architecture and Sculpture at the School of Design at the University of Malta. Dimech worked on various religious statues, monuments and other sculptures, many of them in Maltese globigerina limestone. He exhibited some of his works in international exhibitions. His work caught the attention of the British authorities, and Governor Thomas Maitland commissioned him to carry out sculptural work at the Palace of St. Michael and St. George in Corfu.

Dimech married Saveria Mathea de Marco in 1802, and they had a son named Sigismondo Dimech, who became a law professor. He died in Valletta on 2 February 1831 at the age of 62, and was buried at the Church of St. Theresa in Cospicua.

== Works ==
=== Religious statues ===
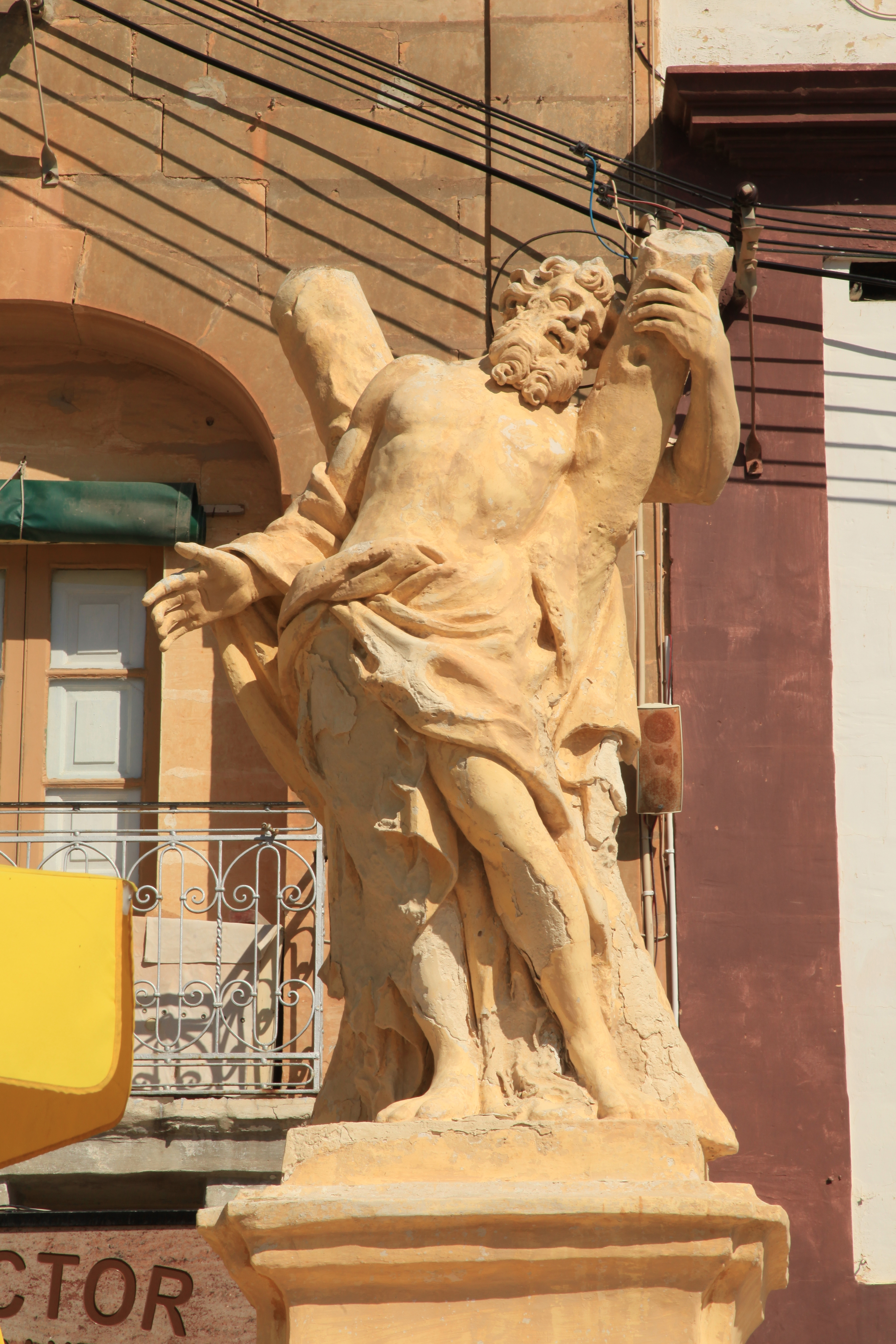
Statue of Saint Andrew, Marsaxlokk (1791)

Dimech is best-known for his religious statues found in various churches around Malta. These include the titular statue of Saint Mary at the Gudja Parish Church and that of Saint Publius at the Floriana Parish Church. Both of these are polychrome statues sculpted out of wood, with the Gudja statue being completed in 1807 and the Floriana statue in 1811.

Other notable works by Dimech in wood include a group of statues representing the baptism of Jesus at the Mosta Parish Church sculpted in 1806, and a statue of Saint Joseph at St Helen's Basilica in Birkirkara which was sculpted in 1826. A statue of Saint Joseph found in the Żurrieq Parish Church is sometimes stated to have been completed by Dimech in around 1825, following the death of its original sculptor Mariano Gerada.

Dimech also sculpted various religious statues in stone, including limestone statues of Saint Andrew in Marsaxlokk (1791) and the prophet Elijah in Cospicua (1818), and a marble statue of the Madonna and Child (commonly known as il-Madonna tan-Nofs) in Senglea (1814).

=== Monuments and other secular works ===
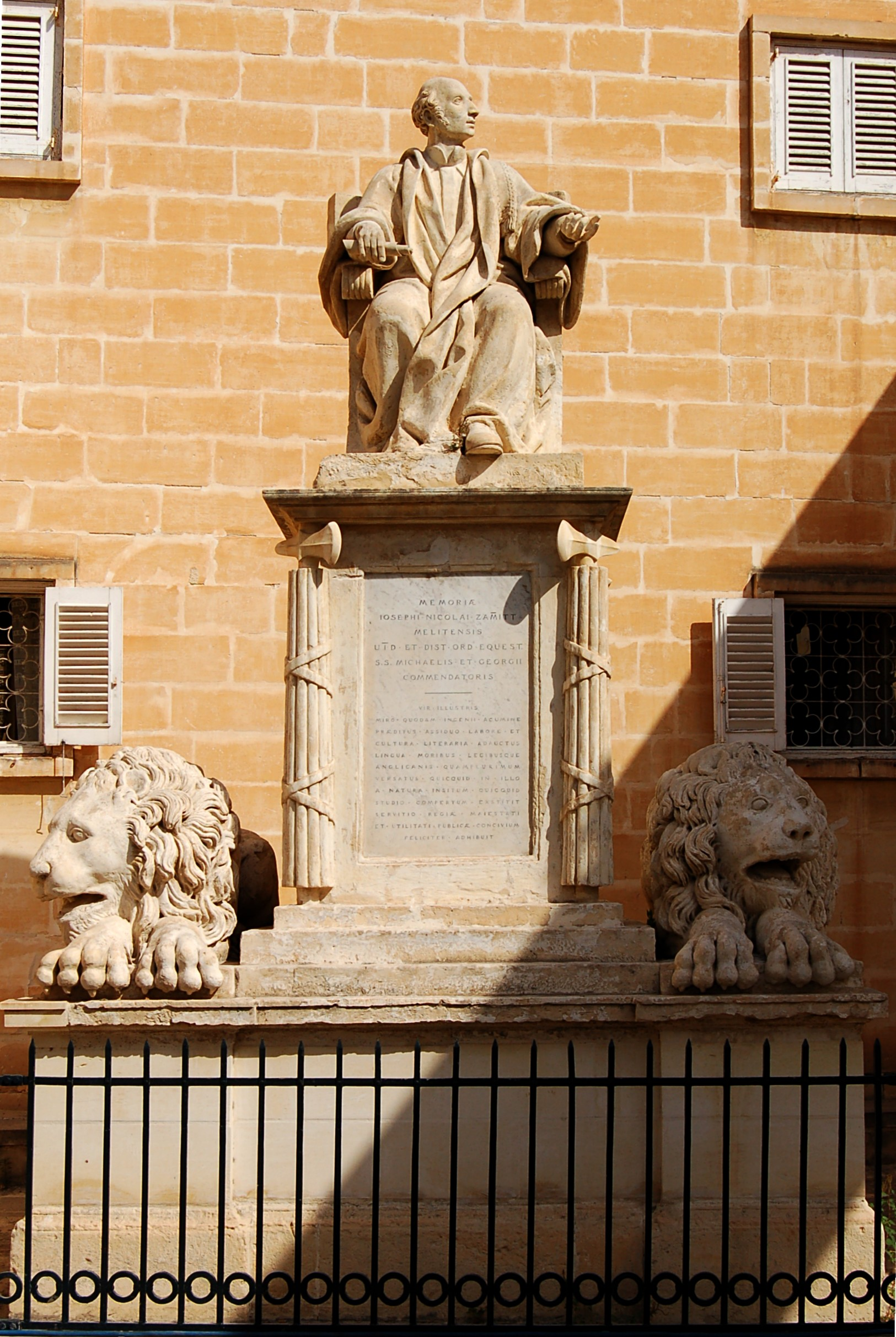
Monument to Sir Joseph Nicholas Zammit, Upper Barrakka Gardens, Valletta (1824)

In 1810, Dimech worked on the sculptural elements of the Monument to Sir Alexander Ball in the Lower Barrakka Gardens. This includes four allegorical statues representing War, Prudence, Justice and Immortality. The monument itself was probably designed by Giorgio Pullicino, Dimech's colleague at the university.

The sculpted British coats of arms which were added to various public buildings during the early years of British rule in Malta are usually attributed to Dimech. These include the arms above the portico of the Main Guard, those in Neptune's Courtyard at the Grandmaster's Palace, the arms at the entrance to the Old University, and those at the now-demolished Porta Reale and Porta Marina.

Dimech also worked on the sculpture at the Palace of St. Michael and St. George in Corfu, which began to be built in 1819. This palace was built out of Maltese limestone, using a Maltese workforce. The palace's interior and exterior sculpture was carried out by Vincenzo Dimech, along with his second cousin Ferdinando Dimech and the Greek sculptor Pavlos Prosalentis.

In 1824, he won a competition for the design of a monument to the judge Sir Joseph Nicholas Zammit at the Upper Barrakka Gardens. This might have been the first time a public competition for a monument was held in Malta. The monument consists of a statue of Zammit sitting on a curule seat, set on a high pedestal decorated with fasces. Two stone lions sculpted by Ferdinando Dimech are located near the pedestal. This monumental statue is considered to be one of Dimech's best works.
