= Ponsonby's Column =

Monumental column in Valletta, Malta

Coordinates: 35°53′56″N 14°30′27.6″E

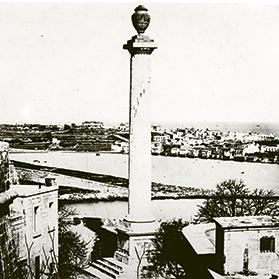
Ponsonby's Column, c. 1860

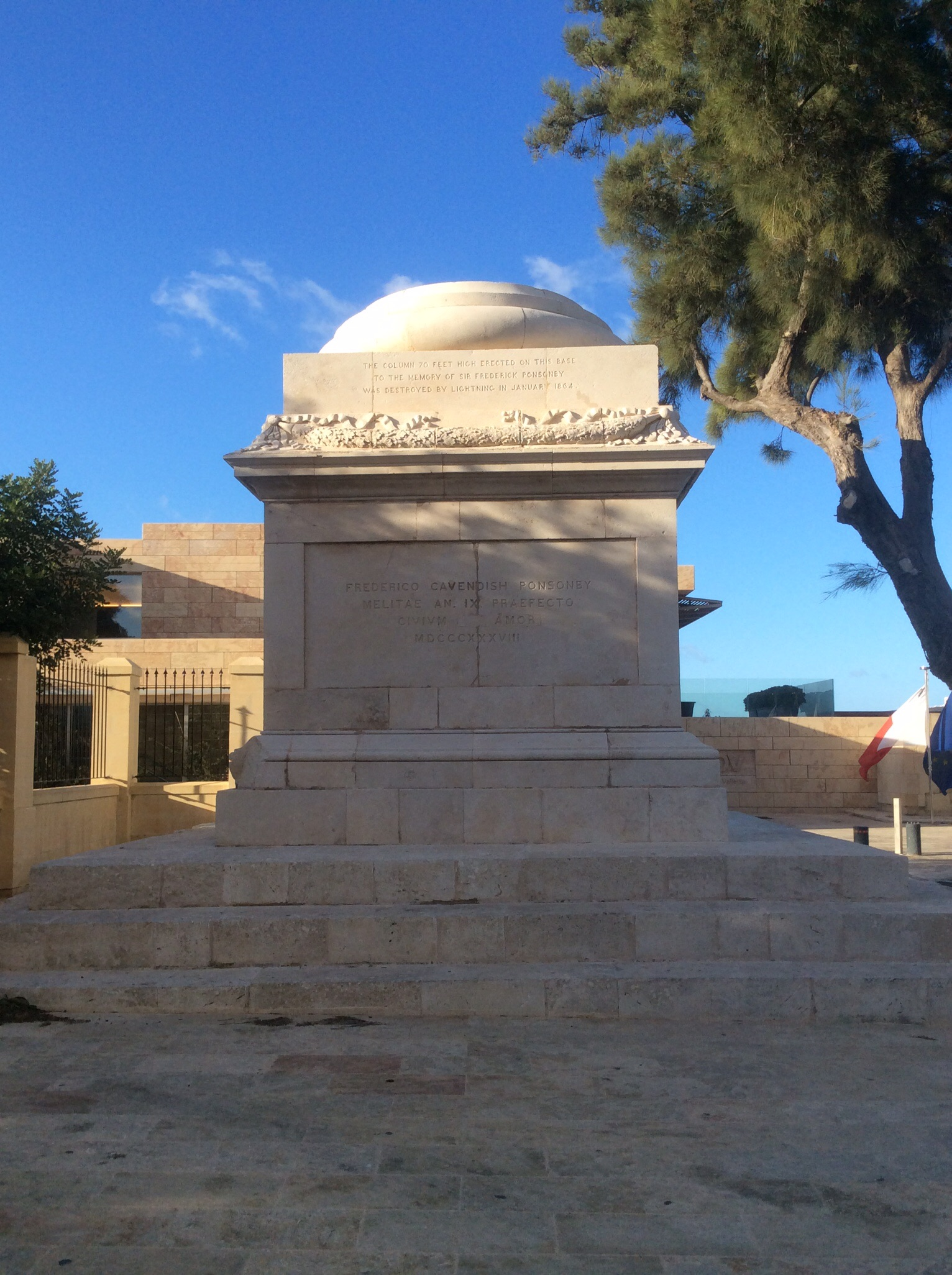
The plinth of Ponsonby's Column, now near Hastings Gardens

Ponsonby's Column, also known as Ponsonby's Cenotaph, was a monumental column in Valletta, Malta. It was built in 1838 as a memorial to Major-General Sir Frederick Ponsonby, a former Governor of Malta, but it was destroyed by lightning in 1864. Its plinth survived, and is now located near Hastings Gardens.

== History ==
Major-General Sir Frederick Ponsonby, an Anglo-Irish aristocrat, was appointed Governor of Malta on 15 February 1827. While Ponsonby was in England in 1836, he resigned from the post of Governor, and died suddenly on 11 January of the following year.

In 1838, a column was built in honour of the dead Governor on St. Andrew's Bastion, overlooking Marsamxett Harbour. Its architect is not known, but it could have been designed by Giorgio Pullicino. The monument consisted of a 70-foot-high Doric column on a plinth, surmounted by an urn. The main inscription read:

FREDERICO CAVENDISH PONSONBY
MELITAE AN. IX. PRAEFECTO
CIVIUM AMOR
MDCCCXXXVIII

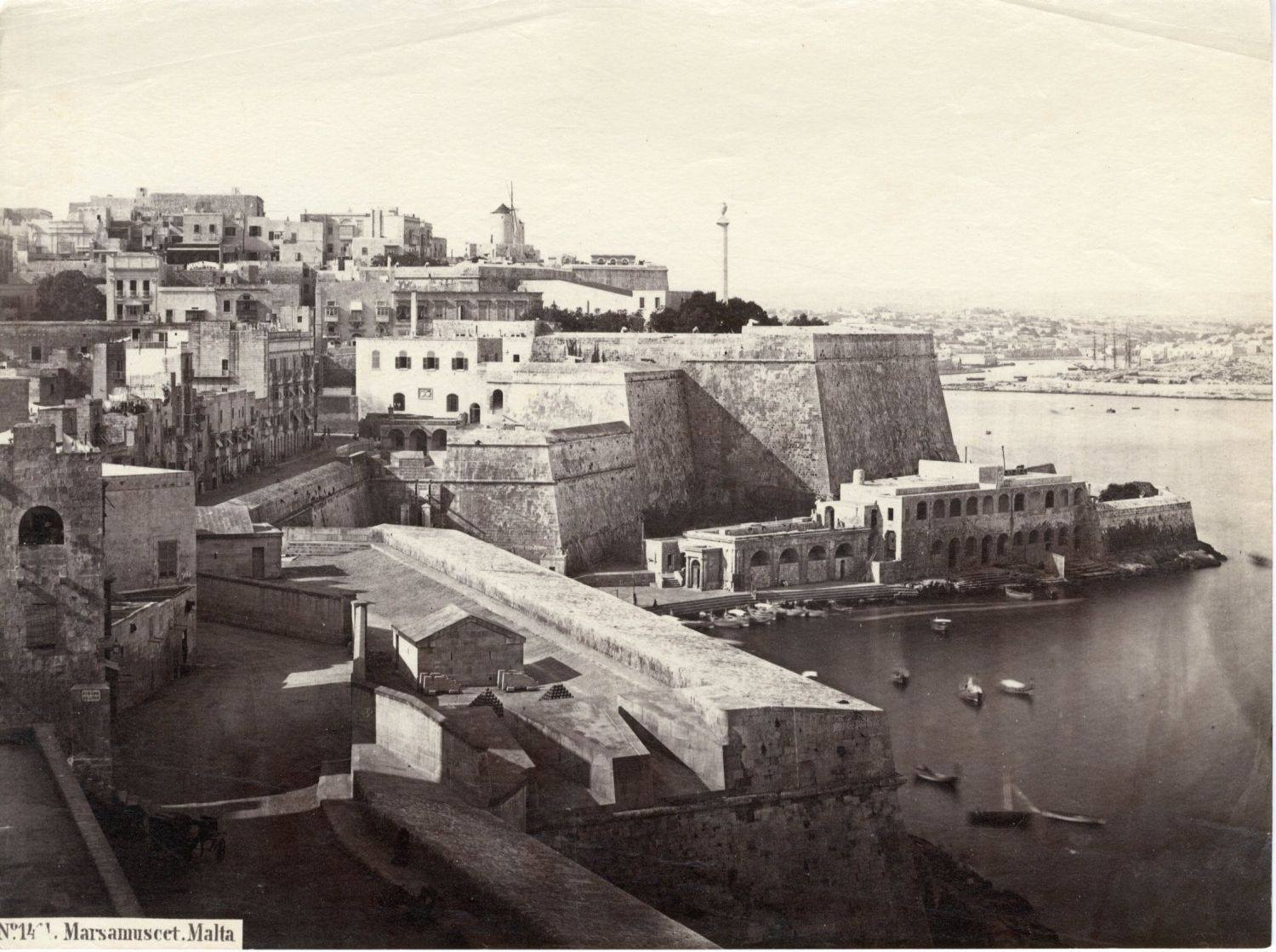
1860 photo of the Marsamxett Harbour area by Giorgio Sommer, showing the column to the centre-right

In January 1864, the column was struck by lightning, and it was subsequently demolished. The plinth remained intact, but in November 1888 it was removed from St. Andrew's Bastion to make way for new gun emplacements on the bastion. The plinth was reassembled near Hastings Gardens on St. Michael's Bastion, and the following inscription was added:

THE COLUMN 70 FEET HIGH ERECTED ON THIS BASE
TO THE MEMORY OF SIR FREDERICK PONSONBY
WAS DESTROYED BY LIGHTNING IN JANUARY 1864

The plinth was damaged by shrapnel during aerial bombardment in World War II. It was restored a number of times over the years, most recently in 2013 under the sponsorship of the Bank of Valletta. The plinth is listed as a Grade 1 national monument by MEPA.

== See also ==
- Spencer Monument
