= Sette Giugno =

Maltese holiday commemorating series of riots in 1919

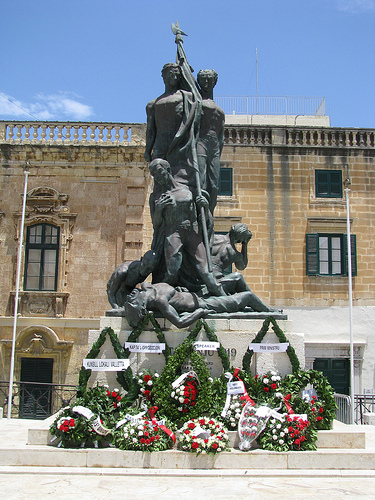
- The Sette Giugno monument, in its original location in Palace Square, Valletta.
- Also called: Sette Giugno; Seventh of June
- Observed by: Malta
- Type: Historical/Cultural/Remembrance
- Significance: In remembrance of an uprising against profiteering merchants and the colonial government, seen as the first step towards Maltese independence.
- Date: 7 June
- Next time: 7 June 2027
- Frequency: Annual

Sette Giugno (Italian, 'Seventh of June') is a Maltese national holiday celebrated annually on 7 June. It commemorates riots which occurred in the Crown Colony of Malta on 7 June 1919 over a cost-of-living crisis in the colony. British troops eventually managed to suppress the riots, killing four in the process. The riots and the British colonial government's response to them led to increased anti-colonial sentiments among the Maltese public, while Fascist Italy and ethnic Italians in the colony viewed the riots as an opportunity to promote Italian irredentism in Malta.

== Background ==
In the aftermath of the First World War, with the disruptions in agriculture and industry across the whole of the continent, the Maltese colonial government failed to provide an adequate supply of basic food provisions for the islands.

The cost of living increased dramatically after the war. Imports were limited, and as food became scarce prices rose; this made the fortune of farmers and merchants with surpluses to trade. The dockyard and government workers found that wage increases were not keeping up with the increase in the cost of food. The dockyard workers formed a union in 1916, and in 1917 organised a strike after being offered a 10% pay increase which was generally regarded as failing to keep up with the cost of living. Some segments of the society did well economically. There was a widespread belief amongst the populace that grain importers and flour millers were making excessive profits over the price of bread. Merchants controlling other commodities also made large profits from the war, in spite of price regulations.

Political developments were also a fundamental cause of the uprising. The first meeting of the National Assembly, held on 25 February 1919, approved a resolution which reserved for Malta all the rights given to other nations by the Versailles peace conference; this would have meant independence from the British Empire. This resolution, tabled by the nationalist faction led by Dr. Enrico Mizzi, was opposed to an original resolution by Dr. Filippo Sceberras which asked solely for responsible government. This moderate resolution was removed in order to secure unanimity and to prevent a break between the two factions.

Nationalist tensions were also present in the crowds who, on 25 February, attacked shopkeepers who had remained open during the meeting of the Assembly, such as the shop "A la Ville de Londres." The police forces had not stopped these attacks, and this played in the hands of the extremist currents in the Assembly.

== The Sette Giugno ==
Sette Giugno
- Part of the Revolutions of 1917–1923
- Date: June 7, 1919 – June 11, 1919; Valletta Riots: June 7, 1919 – June 8, 1919; Sacking of Farrugia Factory, Ħamrun: 8 June 1919; at around 8:30pm Sackings of mills, shops and police stations in Marsa, Żejtun, Luqa, Qormi and Rabat; June 9, 1919 – June 11, 1919
- Location: Valletta (7–8 June); sporadically until 11 June; Crown Colony of Malta
- Caused by: Disgruntlement amongst dockyard worker's after handing of notices and firings; Action to agitation by politician Enrico Mizzi and to a lesser extent, activist Manuel Dimech, by 1914 already deported to Sicily to be later further deported and finally exiled to Alexandria; Further grievance of British dockyard workers having more pay and bonus rates than the Maltese workers.; Ongoing National Assembly meetings (Note: The Assembly members had asked for people to go to Valletta to observe and support the National Assembly's proceedings.); General hunger in the Maltese Islands; Change of University of Malta Senate by-laws adding a thesis requirement in addition to the two exams to the courses of Medicine, Law, and Theology.
- Methods: Ransacking of mills, the University and houses belonging to businessmen.; Burning and/or lowering of British Flags.
- Result: Status quo ante bellum except for concessions.; Censorship re-introduced in the Maltese newspapers for several months after the riots.
- Concessions: Newly arrived Governor Plumer meets with Maltese political representatives and in turn recommends to the Minister of the Colonies that the Maltese are fit to have a more responsible constitution. Way for Amery-Milner Constitution to be granted in 1921 is paved.

Parties
Maltese Protestors: Drydock workers; Maltese supporters of Italian irredentism; University students (Law, Medicine and Theology)	National Assembly Members: Moderates; Radicals	Royal Marines Malta Police Force

Lead figures
No centralised leadership	Camillo Sceberras; Enrico Mizzi; Alfredo Caruana Gatto; Mons. Joseph De Piro; Mons. Enrico Dandria	Governor of Malta Gov.Herbert Plumer (Note: Arrived in Malta on 8 June); Lt. Gov. of Malta (Note: No governor was present during the riots as a transitionary period was in place) William C. F. Robertson; Mjr. General W.C. Hunter-Blair

Units involved
	Nil	7 June: 198 Maltese policemen; 64 British troops, possibly marines; 8 June: unknown quantity of Royal Malta Artillery soldiers (Note: The RMA soldiers never took part in the conflict and simply onlooked.); 140 marines

Number
thousands of civilians	around two hundred assemblymen	262 (7 June) 140 + RMA (8 June)

Casualties and losses
4 civilians dead as a direct result of the riots hundreds wounded	Nil	1 British soldier dead 1 wounded

A few days before the 7 June National Assembly meeting, the Secretary of State for the Colonies had informed Dr. Sceberras that the incoming governor for the islands, Lord Plumer, was to study the situation and report to London with regards to the possibility of giving the Maltese a larger say in the administration of their country. The followers of Enrico Mizzi stated that the Imperial government could not be trusted. Resultantly, the two currents of thought were also reflected in the crowds outside. University students were mostly linked to the extremist camp, and these had staged a protest of their own on 16 May 1919. The police forces were threatening strikes, as were the postal employees.

On Saturday 7 June 1919 the National Assembly was to meet for the second time in the Giovine Malta building. The police had foreseen the possibility of unrest, and on 5 June asked for a number of soldiers to be posted in Castille. As stated later by the Commission inquiring on 7 June uprisings, "Evidently the Police did not appreciate the gravity of the situation."

The first spark of unrest centred on the Maltese flag defaced^{[a]} with the Union Jack flying above the "A la Ville de Londres." Unlike the previous meeting, the shop was now closed. This did not prevent the crowd from forcing itself inside, to remove the flag and flagpole. This incident sparked the uprising. The death of the President of the Court some days earlier had required all governmental departments to fly the Union Flag at half mast, including the Bibliothèque buildings in Pjazza Regina, and the meteorological office. The crowd proceeded to the Officers' Club, insisting that the club's door had to be closed. Window panes were broken, while officers inside were insulted. Police officers trying to restrain the mob were also assaulted. The crowd then returned to the front of the Bibliothèque, shouting for the Union Flag to be taken away; it was promptly removed by the men on duty.

The crowd moved on to the meteorological offices, housed in a Royal Air Force turret. After breaking the glass panes, the mob entered the offices ransacking and destroying everything inside. Some individuals climbed onto the turret, removing the Union Jack and throwing it into the street. The crowd burned the flag along with furniture taken from the offices nearby.

The mob then moved back to Palace square, where they began to insult the soldiers detached in front the Main Guard buildings. The N.C.O. that was responsible for the watch had the doors of the building closed, as were the doors of the Magisterial Palace across the square. In Strada Teatro, the offices of the Daily Malta Chronicle were broken into, with pieces of metal jammed in the workings of the presses to break them. While this was taking place, other crowds were attacking the homes of perceived supporters of the Imperial government and profiteering merchants in Strada Forni.

The Police forces’ acting-commissioner then called for military support. At 17.30, 64 soldiers from the Composite Battalions entered the Courts which housed the headquarters of the police force. Later historians criticised the use of such a small number of soldiers to counter a crowd made up of thousands, which was attacking locations in Strada Teatro and Strada Forni and had now progressed towards Strada Santa Lucia. Six soldiers, under the command of Major Ritchie, the G.S.O., and Captain Ferguson, made their way towards Strada Forni to defend the house of Anthony Cassar Torreggiani, a leading importer, which was under attack by the crowd. Furniture was being thrown outside from the windows.

In the National Assembly, which was unaware of the uprising outside, the moderates were gaining the upper hand. The moderates were bent on accepting the message of the Secretary for the Colonies as a genuine step towards improving the situation, and had to be recognised as such.

Ten soldiers, led by Lieutenant Shields, approached the offices of the Chronicle, which were surrounded by a crowd that then began to throw stones and other objects at the soldiers. The same happened in Strada Forni, where six soldiers were trying to stem a crowd of thousands. Ritchie sent Ferguson to bring reinforcements. With his revolver stolen and his uniform torn, the captain reached a troop of 24 soldiers, which was then directed to Strada Forni. The soldiers were posted along the street, facing in both directions. The troops were not to shoot without being ordered to do so. The soldiers took their positions, aiming at the crowd—which then retreated.

The report of the inquiring commission then proceeded to state that a shot was heard from the direction of a window of the Cassar Torreggiani house. At face value, this gives the impression that the Maltese were the first to shoot during the uprising.

At that moment, as eyewitnesses reported, one of the soldiers shot a round into the crowd, with the rest of the troop following. The first victim of the uprising, Manwel Attard, fell in front of the Cassar Torregiani house. Other individuals were injured. Ġużè Bajada was hit near Strada Teatro, and fell on top of the Maltese flag he was carrying. The officer in charge began shouting for the firing to cease. Meanwhile, in the Chronicle offices, Lieutenant Shields ordered his men outside, since there was an evident smell of gas in the building. Shields feared making the soldiers exit the office one by one, since the crowd outside would certainly attack them; on the other hand, they could not remain inside. To clear a way out, Shields ordered a soldier to shoot low, away from the crowd. This shot hit Lorenzo Dyer, who tried to run away. Since the injury was serious, he was lifted by the crowd and carried to Palace square. During this initial uprising, three died and 50 were injured.

The proceedings in the National Assembly were interrupted as persons injured in the streets were brought inside. Some of the delegates left the buildings, while others ran to the balcony. The Assembly passed a quick motion in order to have a resolution to present to the Imperial government. Count Alfredo Caruana Gatto then addressed the crowds, asking them to restrain themselves from further violence. The Assembly then sent a delegation to the Lieutenant Governor, asking for the troops to be removed for the crowds to retreat. The Governor accepted, and Caruana Gatto addressed the crowd again, which complied and began to fall back.

Disturbances continued the next day, with crowds attacking the palace of Colonel Francia, who also owned a flour-milling machine. Royal Malta Artillery soldiers were used to protect Francia's house, but they were loath to use force against their own countrymen. The crowd forced its way in and threw furniture, silverware, and other objects outside. In the evening, 140 Royal Marines arrived, clearing the house and street of crowds. Carmelo Abela was in one of the side doorways of Francia's house, calling for his son. Two marines proceeded to arrest him, and when he resisted, a marine ran him through the stomach with a bayonet. Abela died on 16 June.

== Aftermath ==
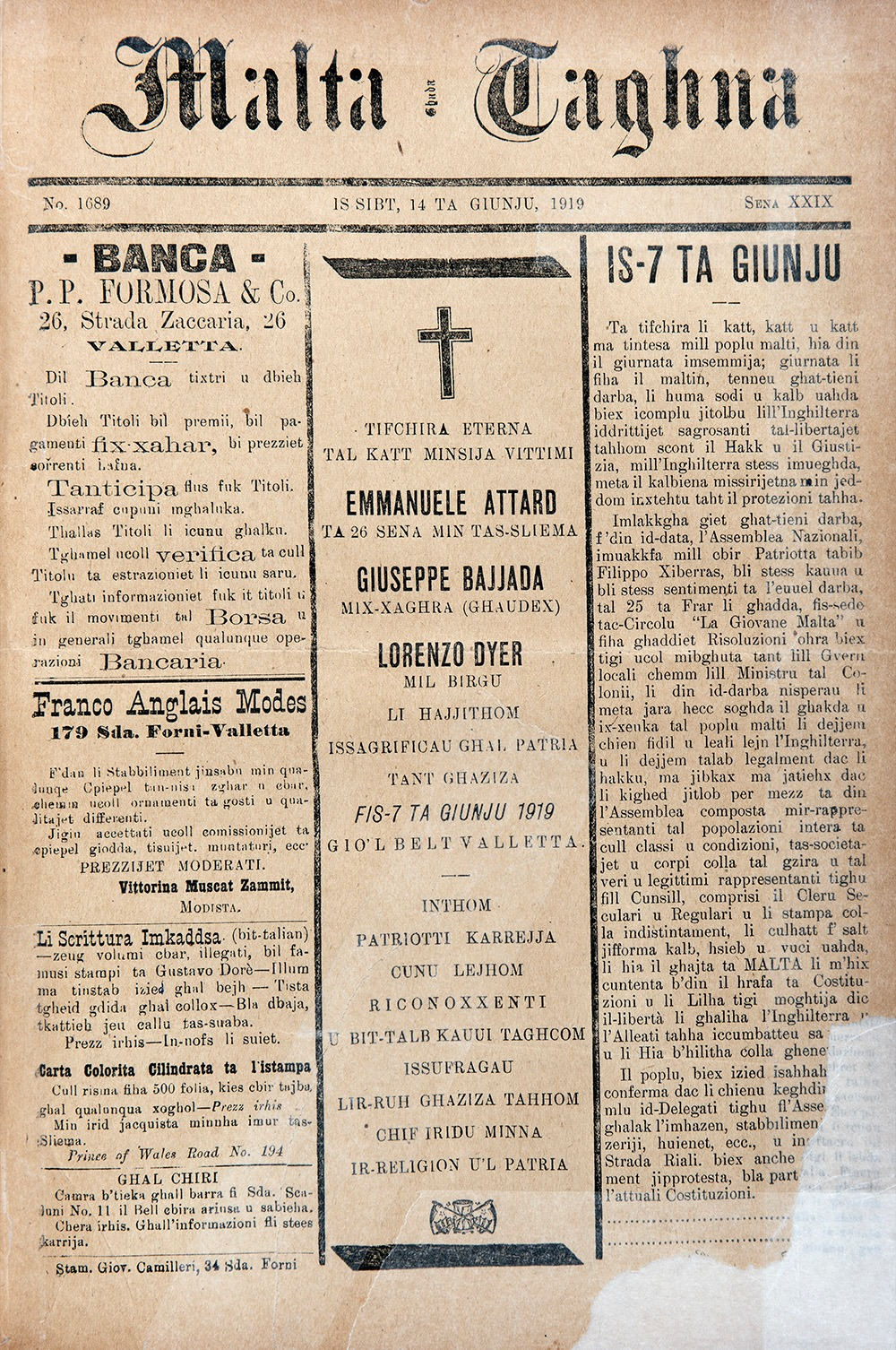
Malta Taghna, 14 June 1919

The riots reflected the unsatisfactory nature of economic and political life in Malta. Economically the island had become a fortress in which a few prospered when military spending was high. Strategically, the imperial fortress was so important that political development was stifled.

The day after the attack, censorship was reinstated for political articles. In the morning, flowers and other tributes were placed in the streets where the victims had died. The deaths and injuries of so many people did not halt the uprisings. Another group attacked the flour mills owned by Cassar Torreggiani in Marsa, while other trading houses were raided in the outlying villages.

A Military Court was opened to investigate the uprising on 16 June, with a court-martial instituted to investigate thirty-two people who had taken part in the uprisings. For legislative matters, the Sette Giugno underlined the urgency of reform. The new Governor, Lord Plumer, recommended liberal concessions to the Maltese. The House of Commons of the United Kingdom stressed that Malta was to have "control of purely local affairs", with the Colonial Secretary sending a detailed description of the proposed constitution to the National Assembly. On 30 April 1921, the Amery-Milner Constitution was proclaimed; political censorship enforced after the uprising was repealed on 15 June 1921. The first election held under the new constitution was held in October 1921, with the Prince of Wales inaugurating the new representative chambers on 1 November 1921.

The bodies of the four victims of the Sette Giugno were placed in their tomb in the Addolorata Cemetery on 9 November 1924. On that occasion, the Italian Fascist government celebrated the four victims as "martyrs" of the Italian Risorgimento and heroes of the Italian irredentism in Malta.

On 7 June 1986, the Sette Giugno monument was inaugurated at St George Square (Palace Square), Valletta. The Maltese Parliament declared the day to be one of the five national days of the island, on 21 March 1989, with the first official remembrance of the day occurring on 7 June 1989.

== Relocation of monument ==
In October 2009, following the renovation of St George Square (Palace Square), the monument was removed from the square and kept stored for quite some time. Due to great public appeal against the storage of such a nationally important monument, in May 2010 it was temporarily placed in Hastings Gardens, Valletta.

On 3 December 2016, the monument was returned to St George's Square in Valletta. Following a public consultation, the government decided to return it to the original place in front of the Palace.

== See also ==
- Blood on the Crown (2021 film).
- Documentary in 4 parts by Public Broadcasting Service's Television Malta in 2019 called 'Culhatt al Belt' (old Maltese spelling of Kulħadd għall-Belt!, in English meaning "Everyone to Valletta!") from primary sources in the National Archives of Malta available freely on YouTube:
  - Part 1 – https://www.youtube.com/watch?v=sCiZgWbCMUs&pp=ygUOY3VsaGF0IGFsIGJlbHQ%3D
  - Part 2 – https://www.youtube.com/watch?v=e5QELEL4t6U&pp=ygUOY3VsaGF0IGFsIGJlbHQ%3D
  - Part 3 – https://www.youtube.com/watch?v=5i-MessRvoc&pp=ygUOY3VsaGF0IGFsIGJlbHQ%3D
  - Part 4 – https://www.youtube.com/watch?v=En4Z-JqCx14&pp=ygUOY3VsaGF0IGFsIGJlbHQ%3D

== Bibliography ==
- Bartolo, Paul (1979), X'kien ġara sew fis-VII Giugno 1919
- Blouet, Brian (2004), The Story of Malta, Progress Press
- Cremona, J.J. (1994), The Maltese Constitution and Constitutional History Since 1813, Publishers Enterprises Group Ltd (PEG)
- Ganado, H. (1977), Rajt Malta Tinbidel, Volum I.
- Grech, J. (1997), Malta Taħt l-Ingliżi, Klabb Kotba Maltin
