= Giorgio Pullicino =

Maltese painter, architect, and professor of drawing and architecture

- Born: 8 July 1779; Valletta, Hospitaller Malta
- Died: 25 October 1851 (aged 72); Valletta, Crown Colony of Malta
- Education: Accademia di San Luca
- Style: Neoclassical
- Spouse: Vincenza Pullicino née Attard
- Children: 7
- Parents: Pietro Paolo Pullicino (father); Clara Pullicino née Azzarillo (mother)
- Relatives: Alberto Pullicino (uncle)

Giorgio Pullicino (8 July 1779 – 25 October 1851) was a Maltese painter, architect, and professor of drawing and architecture at the University of Malta. He is known for his harbour views painted in a number of media, and he is also considered to be one of the first neoclassical architects in Malta. He produced designs for a number of buildings, but the only structure which is definitely proven to have been designed by him is a monumental obelisk known as the Spencer Monument. However, several other buildings, including the Monument to Sir Alexander Ball, are widely attributed to him.

== Biography ==
Pullicino was born in Valletta on 8 July 1779, as the son of Pietro Paolo Pullicino and his wife Clara née Azzarillo. He was the nephew of the painter Alberto Pullicino. He had an inclination to drawing from a young age, and attended a design school run by Michele Busuttil before being sent to Rome in 1794 to study at the Accademia di San Luca. Pullicino studied the works of Raphael and Titian, and met a number of the leading artists of the time, including Antonio Canova. He became familiar with neoclassicism in both art and architecture, including the works of the French architect Claude Nicolas Ledoux. His father died in 1799, while he was still in Rome.

During Pullicino's six years abroad, Malta had been transformed by political turmoil. Hospitaller rule had ended in 1798 when the islands were invaded and occupied by the French. The Maltese later rebelled against French rule with British, Neapolitan and Portuguese assistance, and Malta became a British protectorate in September 1800. In that same month, Pullicino arrived in Malta from Rome and went to live with his mother in Valletta. He married Vincenza Attard in April 1807, with whom he had seven children.

In 1803, Pullicino became a professor of drawing and architecture within the University of Malta. He officially became qualified as perito agrimensore (architect and surveyor) in 1830. Pullicino was a representative of the Maltese body of architects in a petition to the Royal Commission on the Affairs of Malta in 1836. He retired in 1839, but continued to work in his private studio for another three years. For the last few years of his life, he was confined to his home in Valletta due to an illness. He died on 25 October 1851 at the age of 72.

== Works ==
=== Paintings ===
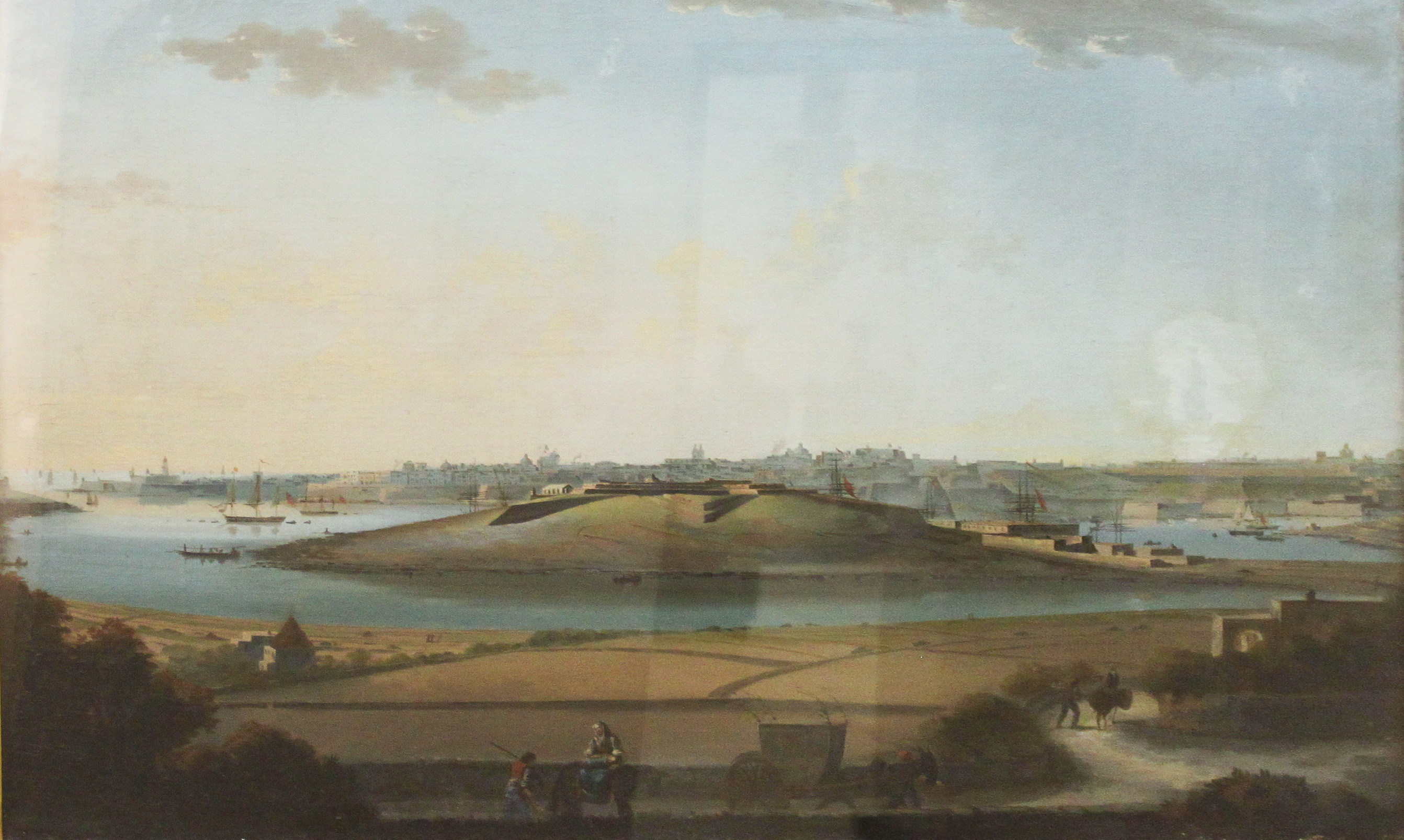
View of Manoel Island, National Museum of Fine Arts, Valletta

Throughout his career, Pullicino produced paintings in a variety of media, including pen and wash, watercolours and oils. He had a picturesque, naturalistic style, and mainly painted scenes of Valletta, the Grand Harbour and Marsamxett Harbour. He also painted a few other places in Malta, such as the Gozo Citadel and St. Julian's Bay. He also produced watercolours of local costumes.

He sold many of the landscape paintings in order to supplement his salary at the university, some of them to foreigners, including British military personnel stationed in Malta. Many of his works can now be found in the National Museum of Fine Arts in Valletta or in private collections, both in Malta and abroad.

=== Architecture ===
In 1804, Pullicino produced a proposed design for rebuilding the Porto Salvo Church in Valletta, since the original church had been declared unsafe and was demolished. Pullicino's design was in a restrained form of Baroque which included a number of neoclassical elements. His design was not chosen, and the church was rebuilt to a Baroque design of Antonio Cachia. Pullicino also submitted a design for a small church in Luqa, and another for the reconstruction of the Mosta parish church, which was once again not chosen in favour of Giorgio Grognet de Vassé's neoclassical Rotunda.

The only existing structure for which there is historical evidence proving that it was designed by Pullicino is the Spencer Monument. The monumental obelisk was built in 1831 on Corradino Hill, and it was later relocated to Blata l-Bajda in 1893. The original architectural plans of the structure have survived, proving that Pullicino designed it.

Apart from the obelisk, a number of architectural works are attributed to Pullicino. The Monument to Sir Alexander Ball, built in the Lower Barrakka Gardens in 1810, was "with almost absolute certainty" designed by Pullicino, but the original plans have not been found. This monument is one of the first examples of Neoclassical architecture in Malta, and Pullicino is credited as one of the first exponents of this style on the island.

The Doric portico of Main Guard in Valletta, which was built in 1814, is also often attributed to Pullicino, although it might have alternatively been designed by Colonel George Whitmore of the Royal Engineers. Other structures which might have been designed by Pullicino include a fountain and exedra at Lower Saint Elmo, Villa Frere in Pietà, and the rear entrance of the Old University in Valletta. The latter is built in a style typical of Pullicino, and he is the likely designer since he was the professor of architecture at the University at the time of its construction in 1824.

Pullicino is also a possible candidate as the unknown architect of the now-destroyed Ponsonby's Column, built in 1838.

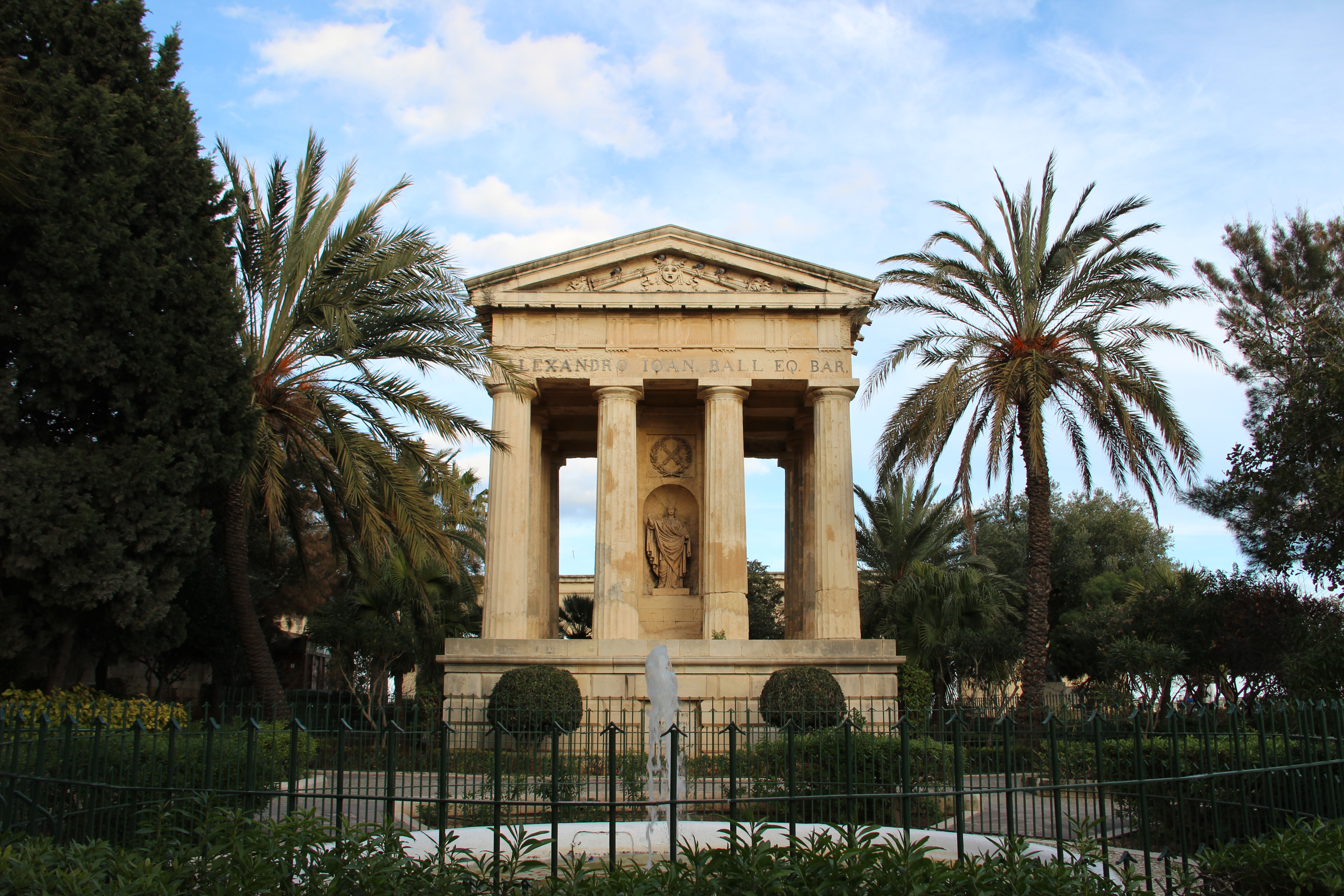
Monument to Sir Alexander Ball (1810)

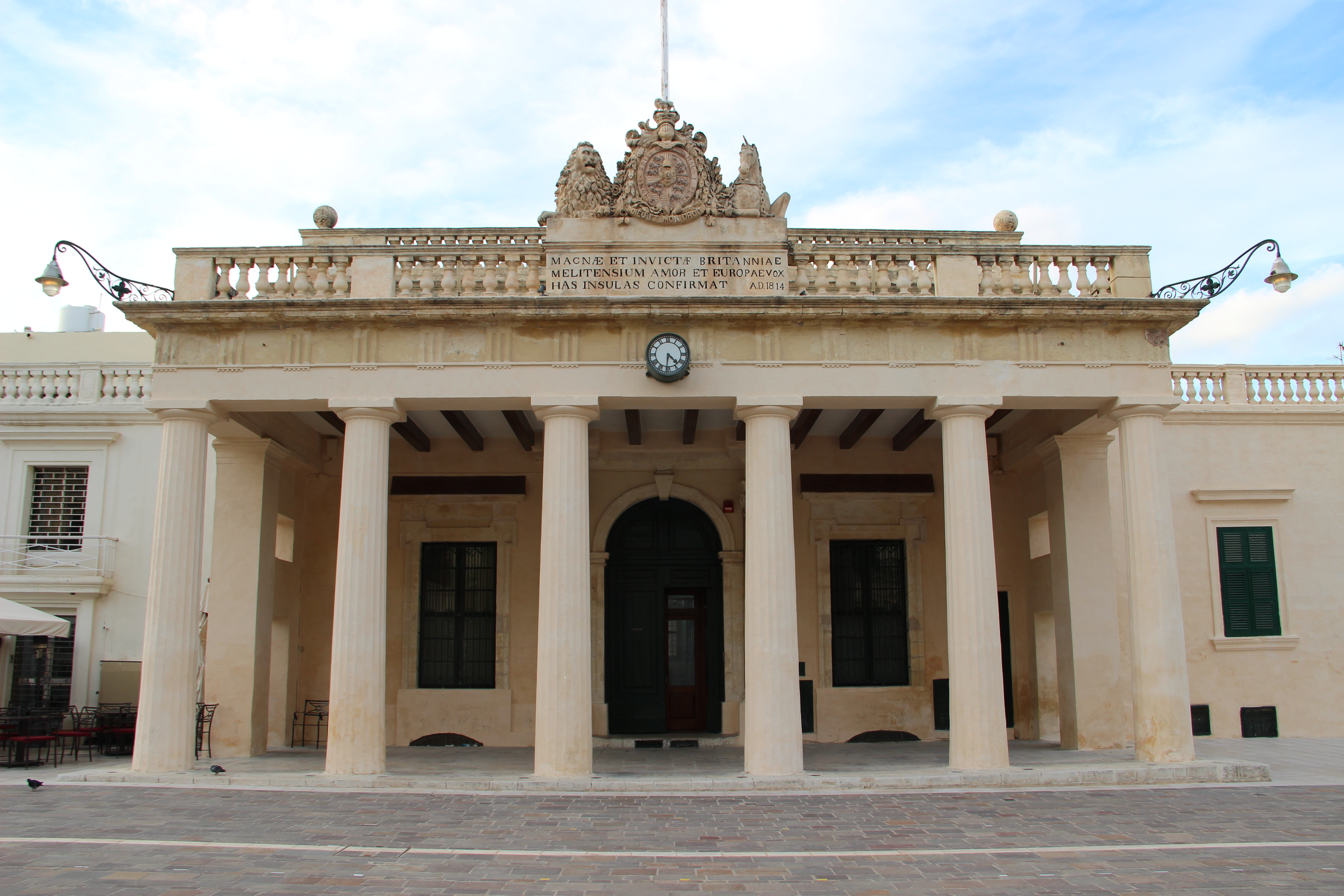
Main Guard portico (1814)

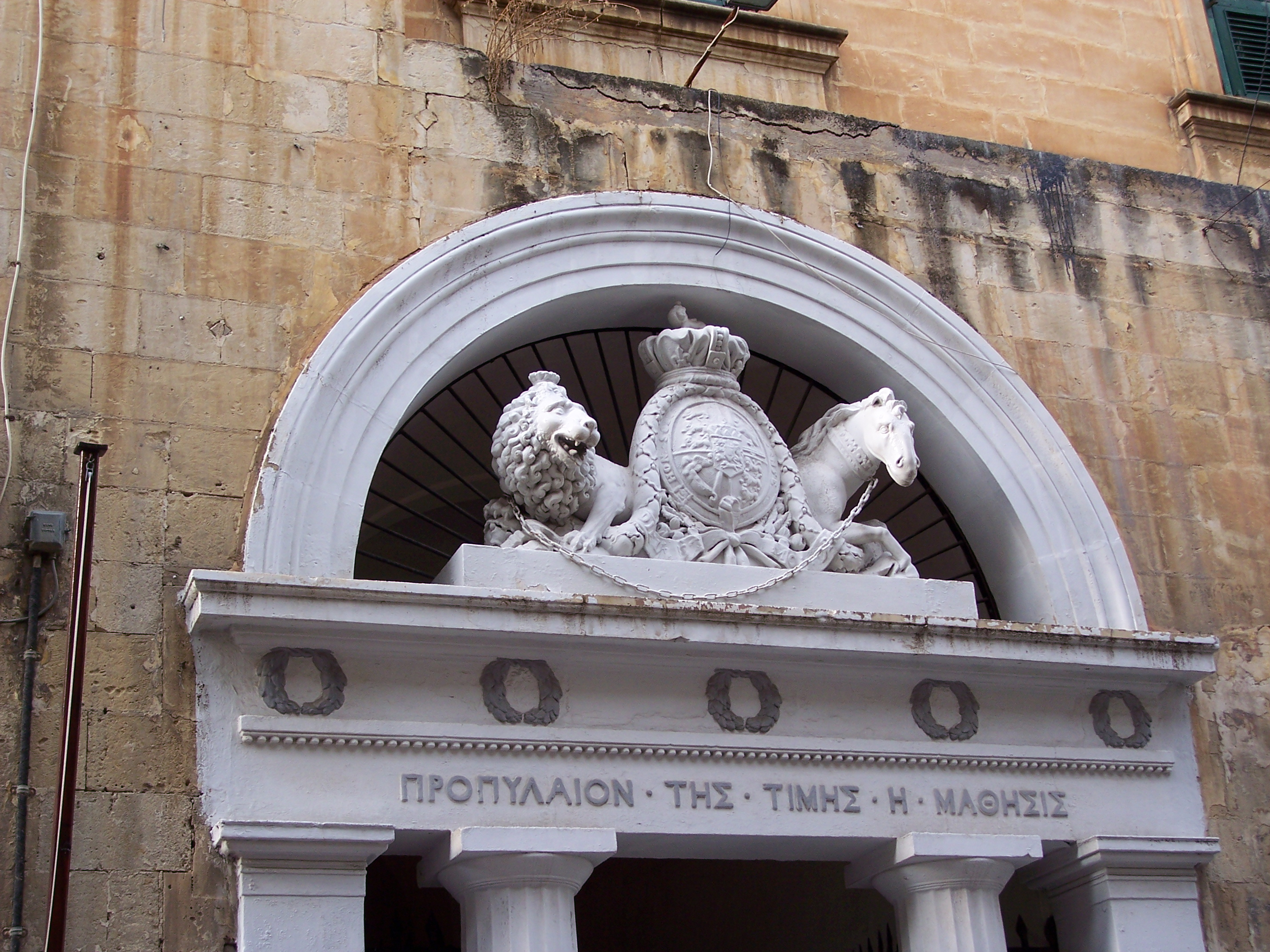
Old University entrance (1824)

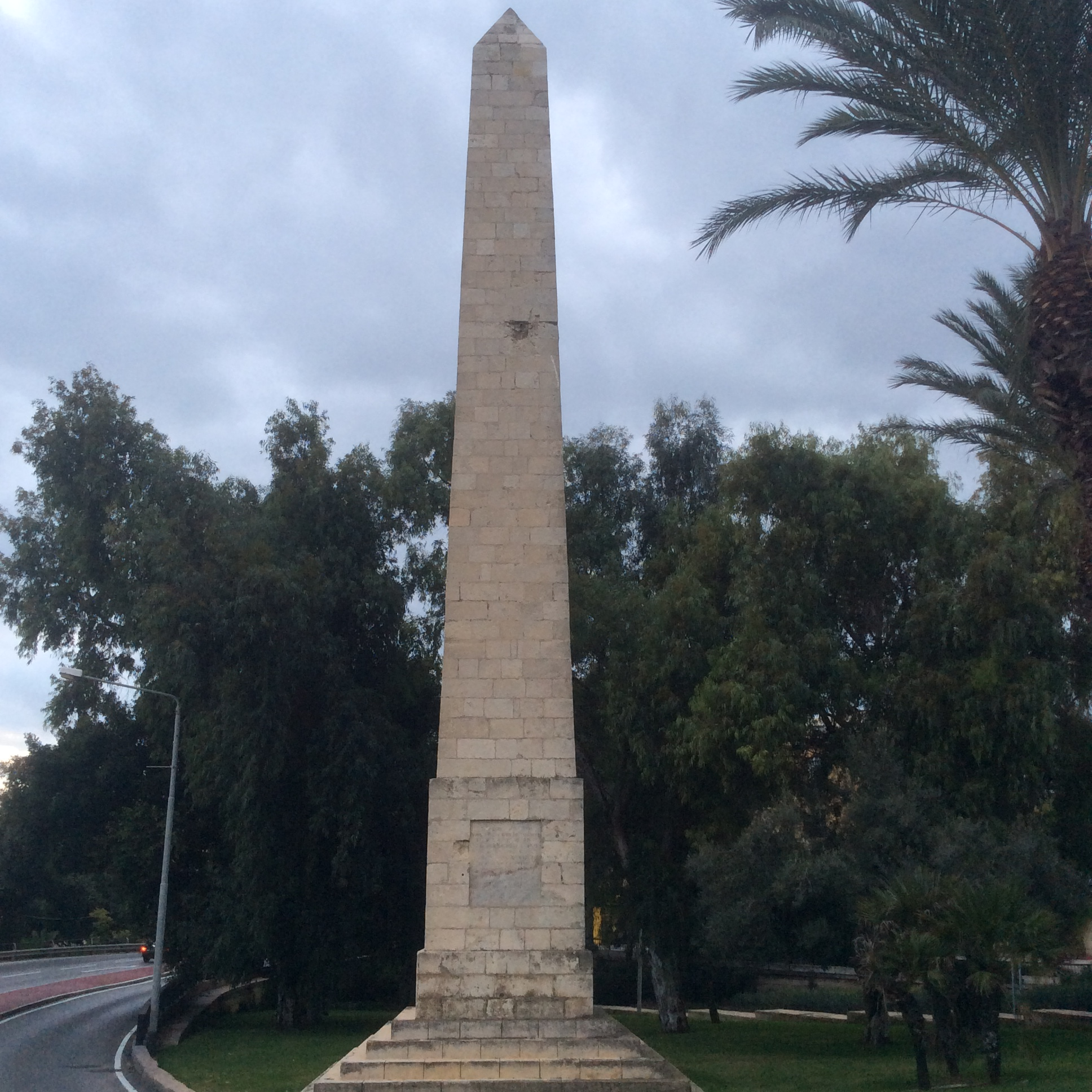
Spencer Monument (1831)
