= Alberto Pullicino =

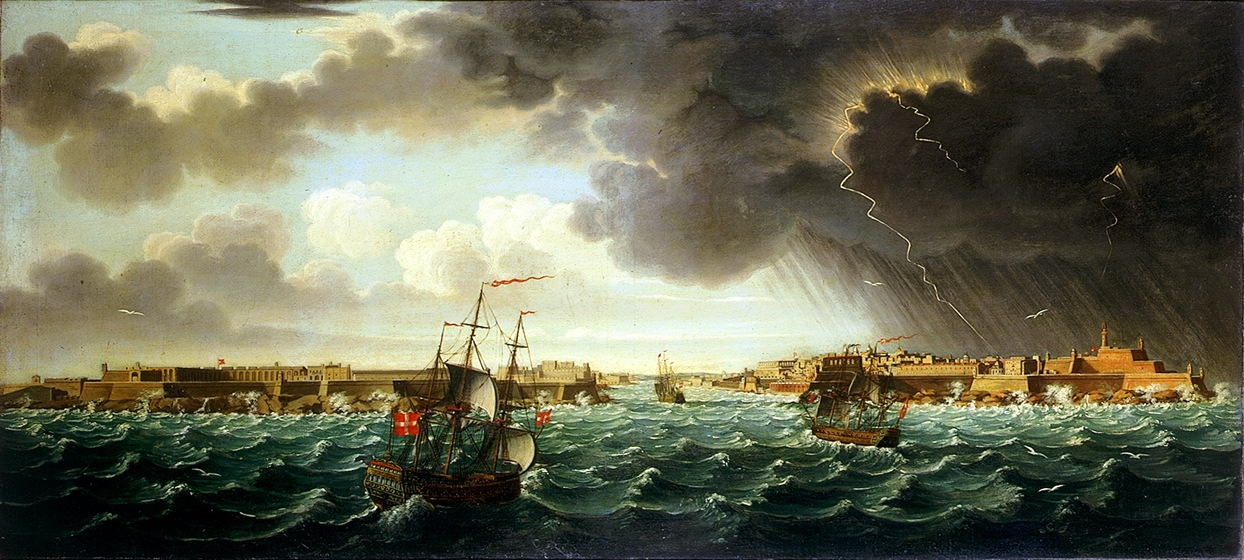
Shipping in a Rough Sea off Malta (c. 1750), National Maritime Museum, London

Alberto Pullicino (6 February 1719 – 1759), born Philiberto Pullicino, was a Maltese painter. The son of Giuseppe Pullicino and Angela Cantone, he was born in Valletta and probably lived there for his entire life.

He mainly painted panoramic views of Malta's main ports, the Grand Harbour and Marsamxett Harbour. His works were popular with French knights of the Order of St. John, and some of his works can now be found in France.

He was the uncle of Giorgio Pullicino, who was a painter and an architect.
