= Spencer Monument =

Obelisk monument in Malta

Coordinates: 35°53′14.9″N 14°29′51.8″E

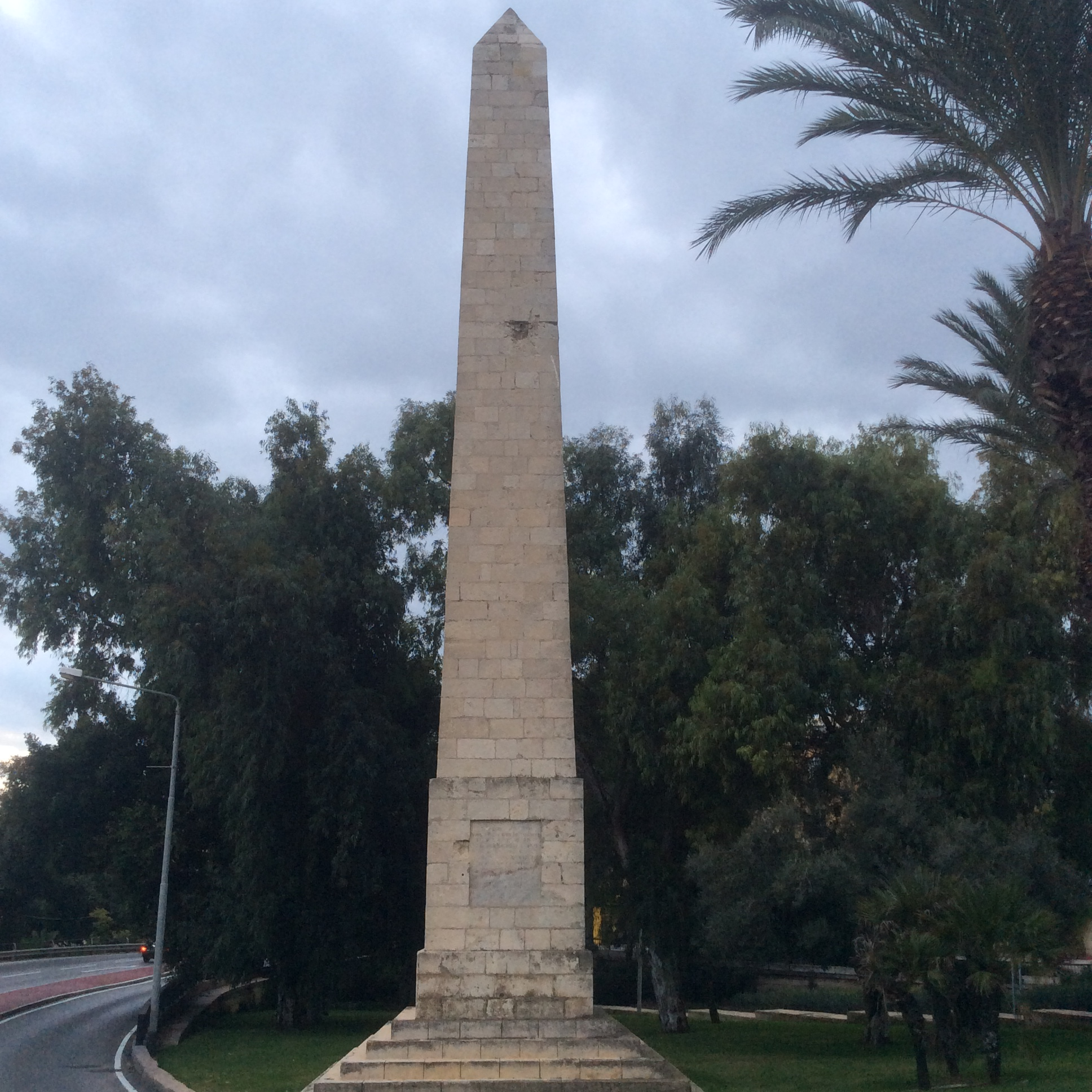
Spencer Monument

The Spencer Monument is a restored obelisk monument on the way to Valletta, in Blata l-Bajda, Malta, erected for Captain Sir Robert Cavendish Spencer, R.N., a cousin of the Governor of Malta, Sir Frederick Ponsonby (1783–1837).

== History and general information ==
Sir Robert Cavendish Spencer was born in the Spencer family home at Althorp, Northamptonshire, son of The 2nd Earl Spencer and Lavinia, Countess Spencer. He served as private secretary to King William IV (when William was the Duke of Clarence) from 1827 to 1828, and Spencer was knighted for his services. He had a distinguished career in the Royal Navy and was well liked by the men he commanded. (As a young officer, he was a participant at the Battle of New Orleans).

Spencer was the captain of HMS Madagascar, which had just returned from Alexandria, Egypt, and died aboard his ship while in quarantine in Malta on 4 November 1830, aged 39. His body was kept in quarantine at Lazaretto for the full 40 days required, and his remains were buried at St. Michael's Bastion in Valletta on 12 December 1830.

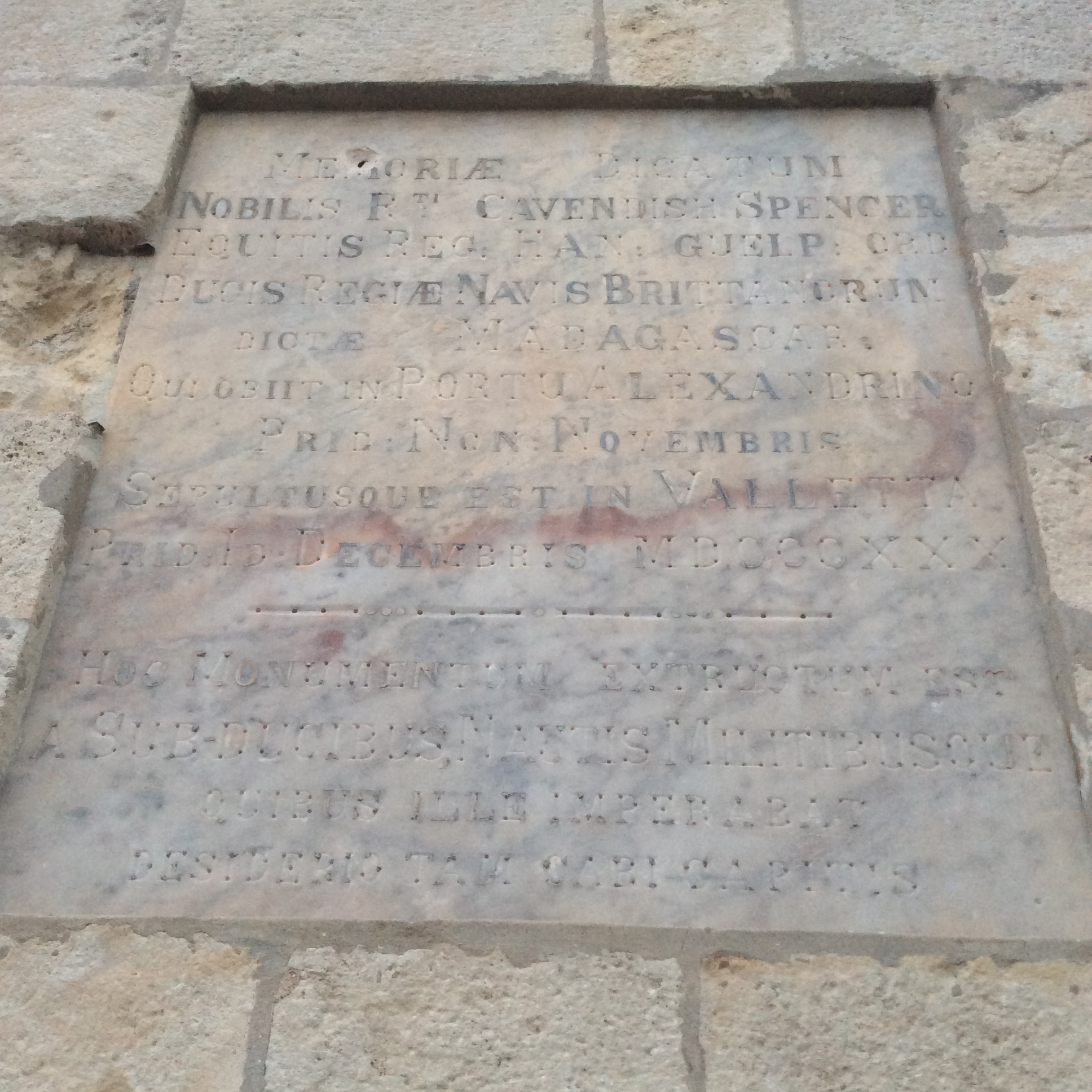
Inscription on the monument

This part of the bastion was later renamed Spencer's Bastion. The burial service was conducted by Madagascar's Chaplain Reverend David Morton. On Spencer's tomb was the inscription:

HERE LIES THE
BODY OF CAPTAIN
THE HONOURABLE
SIR ROBERT CAVENDISH SPENCER KCH AGED 39 YEARS
WHO DEPARTED THIS LIFE ON BOARD AND IN COMMAND OF
HIS MAJESTY’S SHIP MADAGASCAR AT ALEXANDRIA

ON THE 4th DAY OF NOVEMBER 1830

The Spencer Monument was designed by the Maltese architect Giorgio Pullicino in 1831 and was originally located at Corradino Hill. It was moved to its present position in 1893. It was struck by lightning in 1975 and suffered considerable damage, however it was later restored to its original glory.

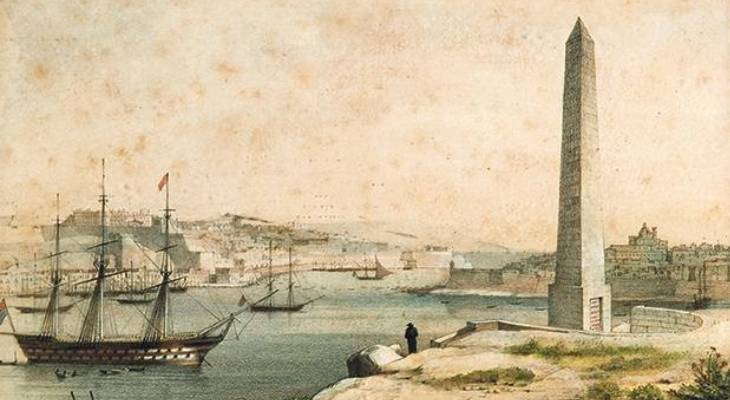
Spencer's Monument on Corradino Hill

== See also ==
- Ponsonby's Column
