= Main Guard (Valletta) =

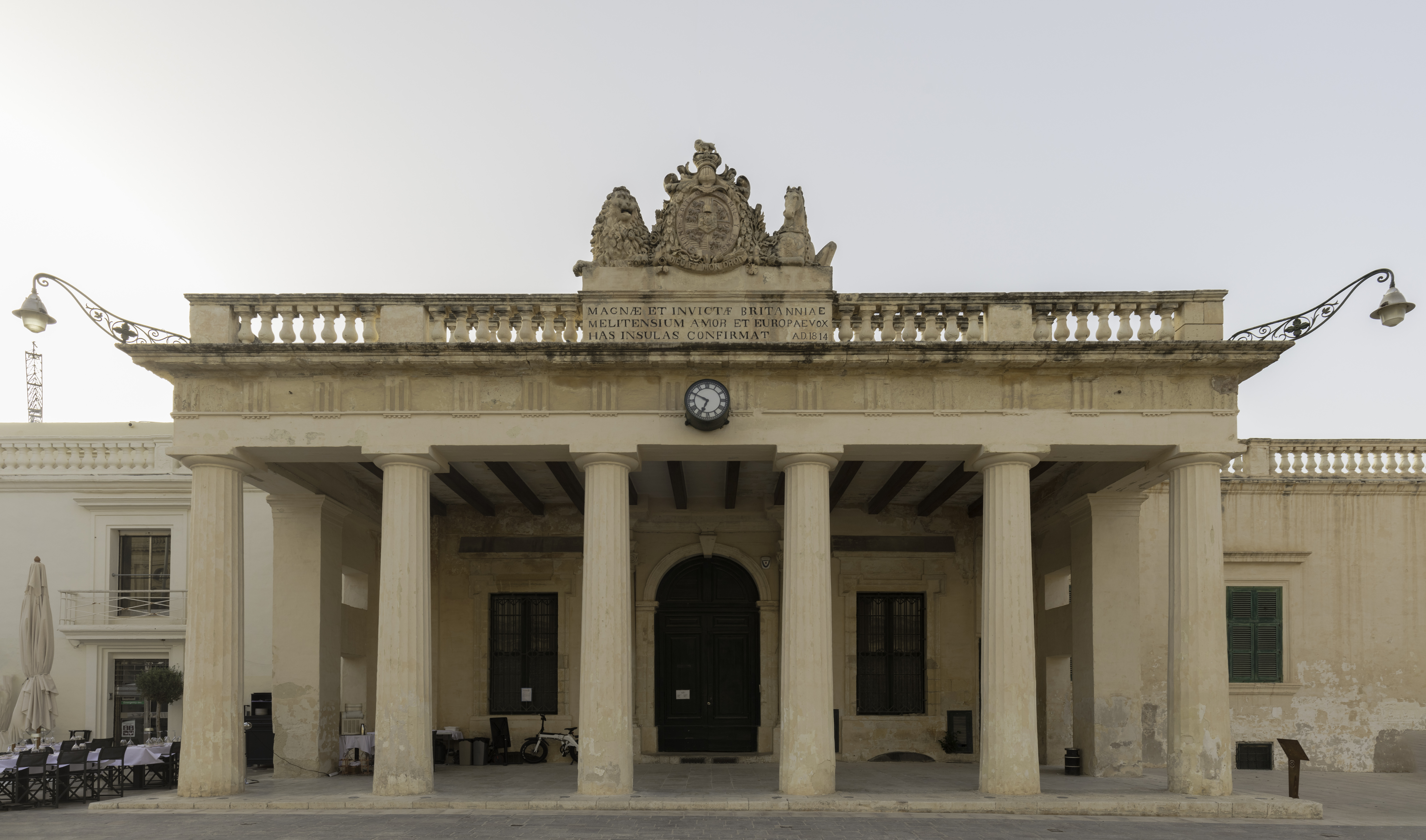
- The Main Guard
- Interactive map of the Main Guard area
- Former names: Guardia della Piazza

General information
- Status: Intact
- Type: Guardhouse
- Architectural style: Neoclassical
- Location: Valletta, Malta
- Coordinates: 35°53′57.4″N 14°30′48.4″E
- Current tenants: Heritage Malta
- Completed: 1603
- Renovated: 1814 (portico added)

Technical details
- Material: Limestone

Renovating team
- Architects: Giorgio Pullicino or George Whitmore (portico, attributed)

The Main Guard, originally called the Guardia della Piazza, is a building in Valletta, Malta, located in St George's Square facing the Grandmaster's Palace in the city centre. It was originally built as a guardhouse in 1603 by the Order of St. John, and it remained in use after the British took over Malta in 1800. A Neoclassical portico was added in 1814, and a British coat of arms and a commemorative inscription were installed later on above the portico. These have become one of the main symbols of British rule in Malta. The building used to house the Office of the Attorney General.

== History ==
The Regimento di Guardia in the 1600.

The Main Guard building was built in 1603 to house the Regimento di Guardia, the personal guards of the Grand Master of the Order of St. John. It was built in the square facing the Grandmaster's Palace. The building's original form without the portico is visible in a painting dating back to the French occupation of Malta.

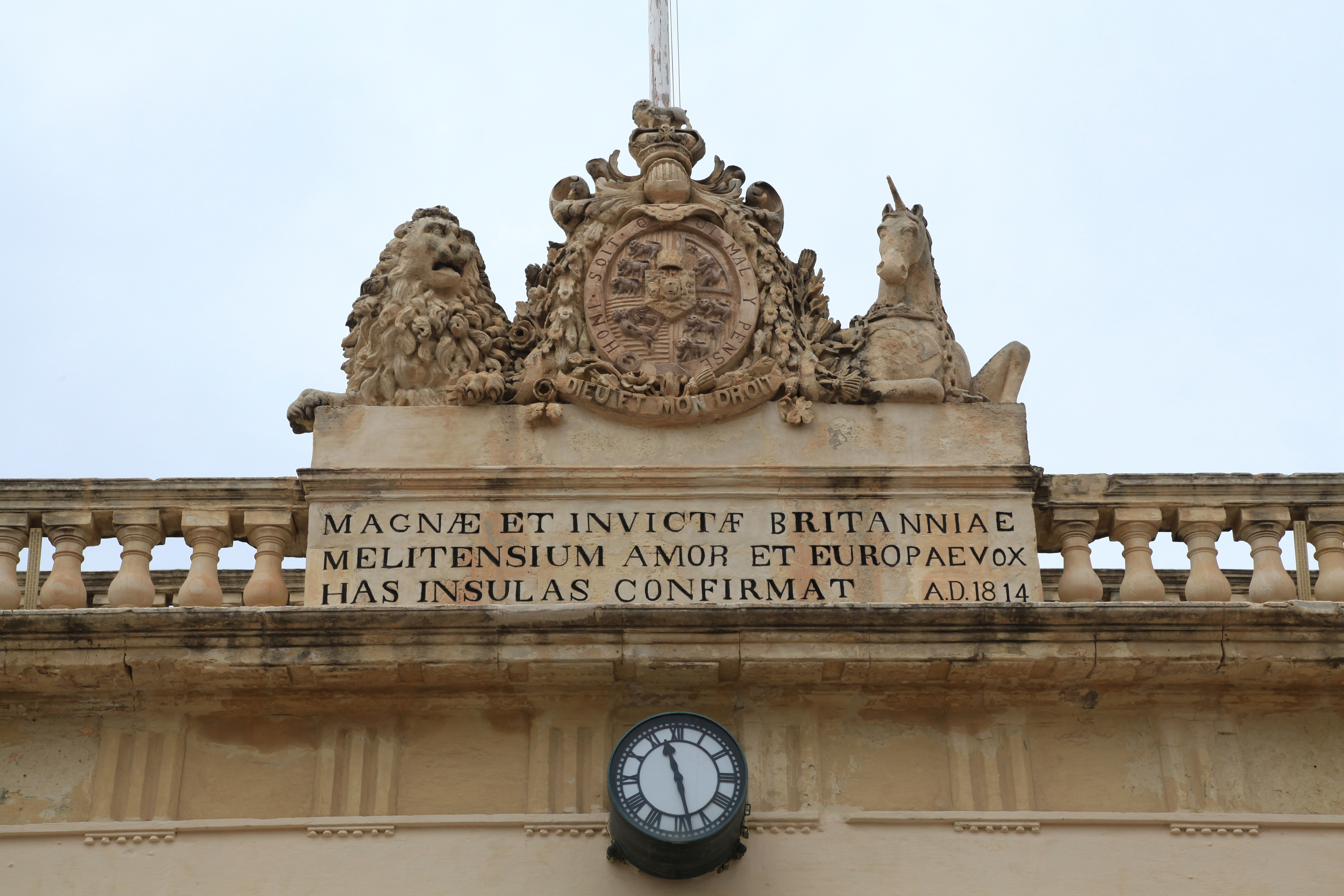
The British coat of arms and inscription above the portico

In 1814, a neoclassical portico was added to the Main Guard by the British, during the governorship of Sir Thomas Maitland. Early paintings from the first few years of British rule in Malta show the building with the portico, as well as three trophies on its roof. Some time later, the trophies were removed, and a relief of the British coat of arms was added above the portico, with the following Latin inscription below it:

magnæ et invictæ britanniae
melitensium amor et europae vox
has insulas confirmat a.d. 1814
(meaning The love of the Maltese and the voice of Europe assigned these Islands to great and unconquered Britain. A.D. 1814)

The portico was designed in the Greek Revival style, hence neoclassic, and is among the first of this design in the country. The design of the portico is attributed either to the Maltese architect Giorgio Pullicino, or to Colonel George Whitmore of the Royal Engineers. The sculpted coat of arms was probably the work of Vincenzo Dimech. The portico, coat of arms and inscription are considered to be one of the most iconic symbols of British rule in Malta.

The British continued to use the building to house the guards of the Governor of Malta, who resided in the Grandmaster's Palace. Life in the Main Guard was quite boring, and many soldiers painted or carved regimental badges or other things on the walls of the building. In 1851, the original coat of arms and inscription had deteriorated to such an extent that they had to be removed and replaced. The new coat of arms was a replica of the original arms of King George III, and not that of the then-reigning monarch Queen Victoria.

In 1974, the building was converted into the Libyan Cultural Centre, and the British coat of arms and inscription were covered in a zinc and plywood box bearing an Arabic inscription. The Libyan Cultural Centre moved in Tower Road, Sliema after the change of government in 1987, and the coat of arms was once again uncovered. The Main Guard subsequently became an annex of the Office of the Attorney General until it was eventually transferred to Heritage Malta for restoration.

In 2009, the inscription and coat of arms were restored once again as part of the regeneration of St. George's Square, but this resulted in a number of spelling errors within the inscription. In 2015, there were plans to transfer the Valletta Local Council into the Main Guard, but they were never implemented. The building is now under Heritage Malta's wing and restoration works were finished in March 2026. It is now serving as an interpretation center for all Heritage Malta sites in the capital city.

== Layout ==
The building's façade has a single floor, but the rear part of the building, which is located in Strait Street, has three floors. This is due to a difference between the levels of the streets.
