= St George's Square, Valletta =

Square in Valletta, Malta

Coordinates: 35°53′56.79″N 14°30′48.95″E

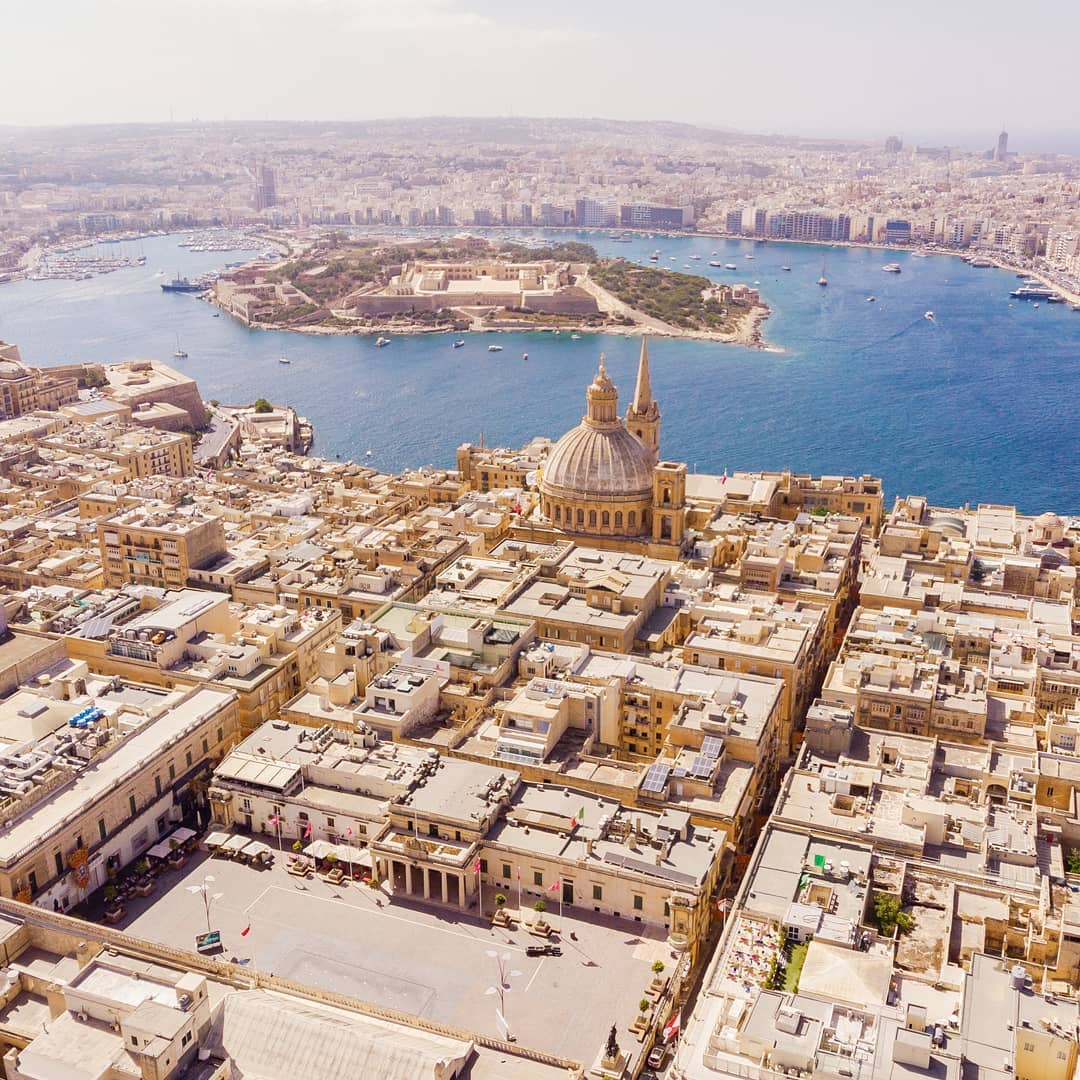
Aerial photograph of St George's Square, looking towards the Main Guard, taken in 2021

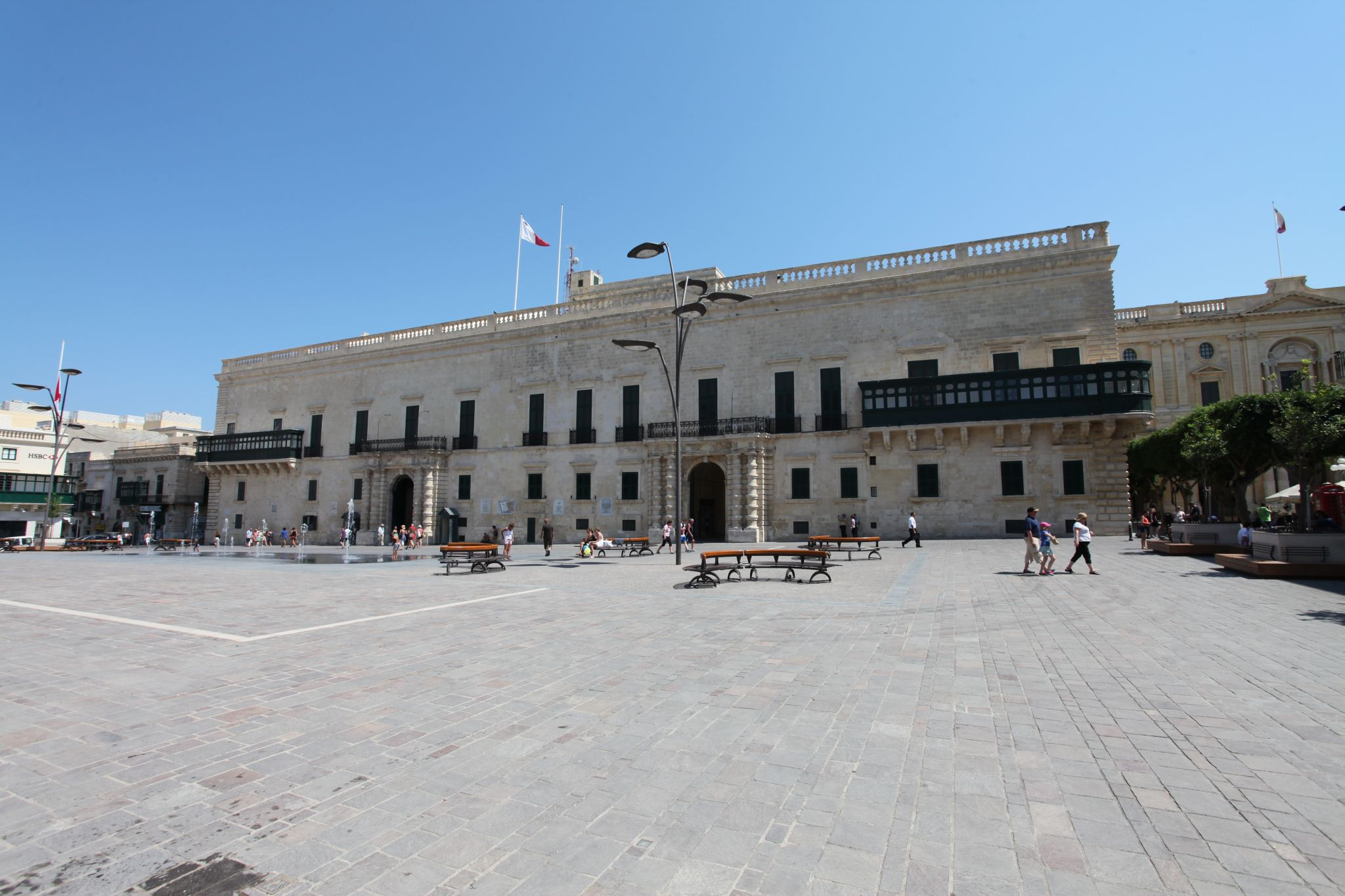
Façade of the Grandmaster's Palace along St George's Square, photographed in 2013

Saint George's Square (Maltese: Misraħ San Ġorġ; Pjazza San Ġorġ, Italian: Piazza San Giorgio) is the principal urban square of Valletta, Malta, located in the centre of the city. It is also commonly known as Palace Square (Maltese: Misraħ il-Palazz) as it faces the Grandmaster's Palace.

The square is bounded by Republic Street along the southeast, Old Theatre Street along the southwest, and Archbishop Street along the northeast. It is linked to Republic Square to the south.

== Buildings and monuments ==
The square is dominated by the main façade of the Grandmaster's Palace at its southeast end. In the late 16th century, four separate buildings were constructed in its place, and these were later amalgamated into a single palace which became the seat of the Hospitaller Grand Masters who at the time ruled the Maltese Islands. The building was gradually altered and embellished by successive Grand Masters, and its present configuration dates back to the mid-18th century. The palace currently houses the Office of the President of Malta and is open to the public as a museum.

The northwest end of the square consists of a building known as the Cancelleria which was constructed in the early 17th century during the magistracy of Alof de Wignacourt. A distinctive neoclassical portico was added to its façade during the early 19th century and this is now regarded as an iconic symbol of the period of British rule; the building itself is now better-known as the Main Guard.

The Casa del Commun Tesoro, formerly the Hospitaller treasury and now housing the Casino Maltese, is located at the square's southwest end, while the Hostel de Verdelin is located along Archbishop Street at the square's northeast end.

The square also features two 18th-century fountains which were built during the magistracy of Emmanuel de Rohan-Polduc at each end of the Cancelleria's façade. The centre of the square features a fountain with water jets which was installed in 2009, and near its northwest end there is a monument commemorating the Sette Giugno riots of 1919.

== History ==
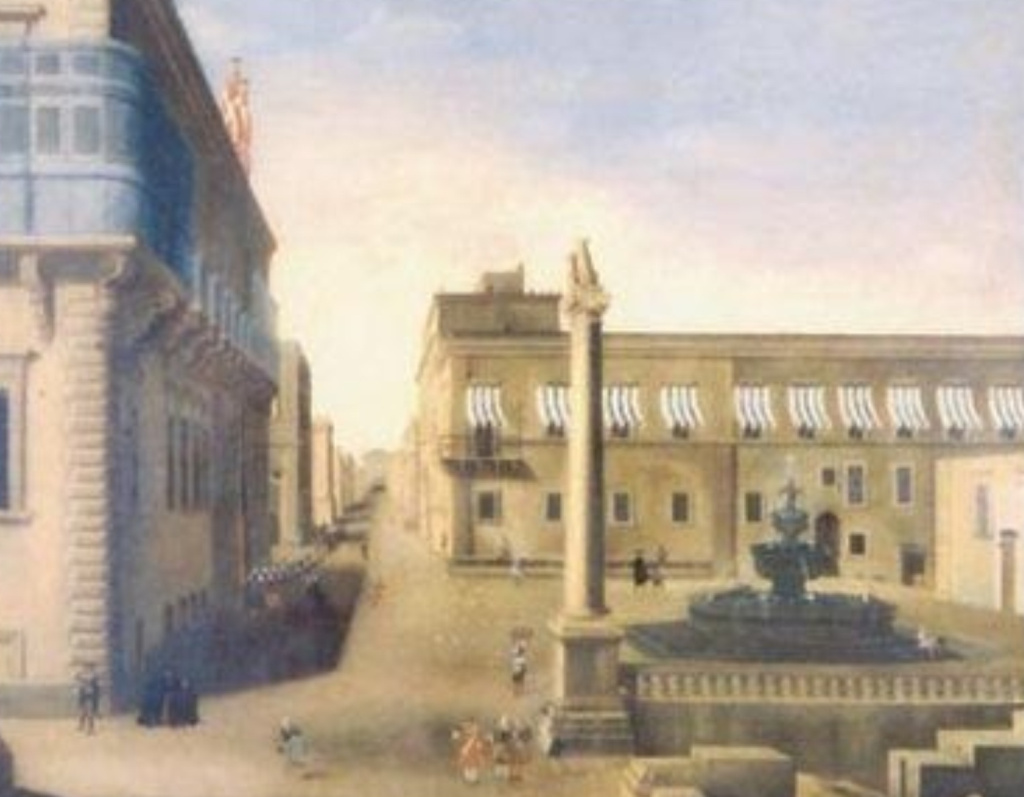
Piazza San Giorgio as depicted in a c. 1750 painting

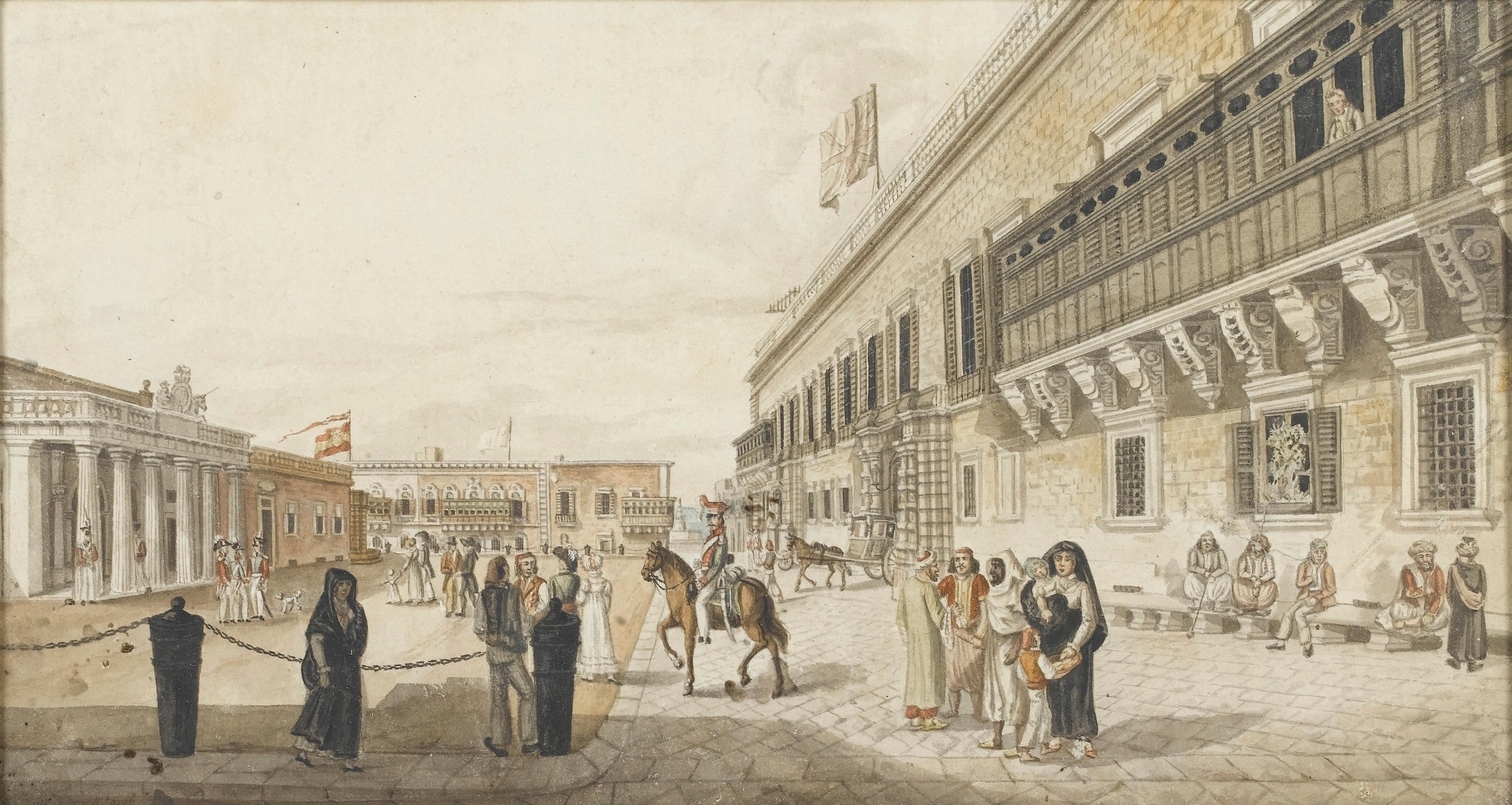
The square as painted by Charles Frederick de Brocktorff, c. 1820

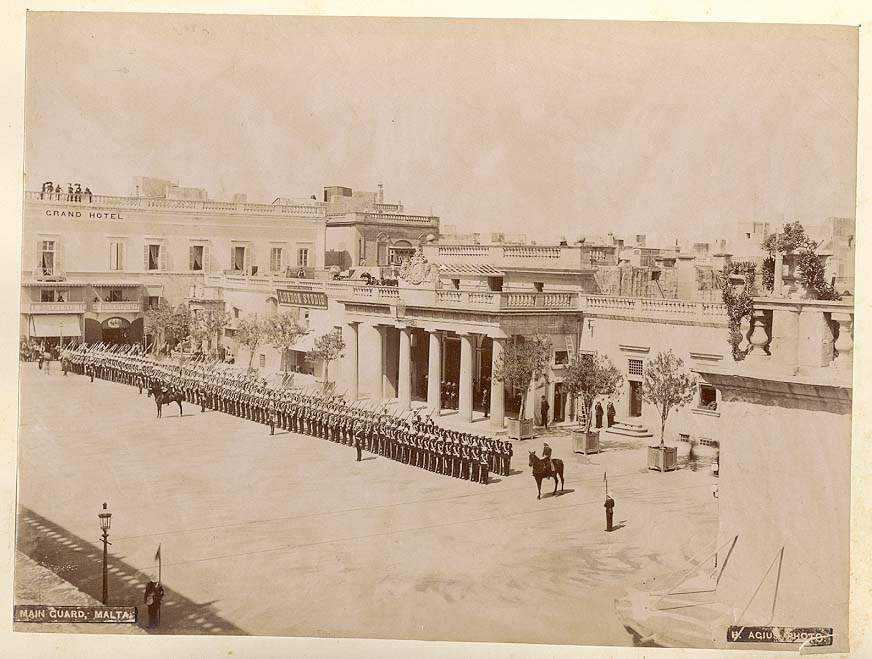
The square being used as a parade ground, as photographed by Horatio Agius, c. 1870s

Archaeological excavations carried out within St George's Square in 2009 revealed that the site was agricultural land before the city of Valletta was established in the 1560s. The square was possibly formed during the magistracy of Hugues Loubenx de Verdalle, who was Grand Master between 1582 and 1595. A monumental column topped by a statue of a wolf, a symbol of Verdalle, stood in the square during the period of Hospitaller rule but it no longer exists.

A fountain supplied by water from the Wignacourt Aqueduct was erected in St George's Square in the early 17th century, and the aqueduct's inauguration ceremony was held there on 21 April 1615. The fountain was altered or replaced by another one in the 18th century, before being removed either during the late Hospitaller period or during British rule. The fountain now stands at St Philip's Garden in Floriana, and its original position within the square was rediscovered during the 2009 excavations, which also revealed remains of underground water channels.

During the Hospitaller period, the square served as a slave market and public floggings of slaves took place there. Carnival celebrations including the kukkanja were also held within the square.

The square was renamed as Place de la Liberté during the brief French occupation of Malta. On 17 January 1799, Dun Mikiel Xerri and 42 other Maltese rebels were executed there by the French authorities.

During the British period, the square was frequently used for military ceremonies such as the changing of the guard, and Samuel Taylor Coleridge referred to the space as "the Parade." The square was the backdrop for several notable episodes in Maltese history, including the Sette Giugno riots of 1919 and the ceremony of the award of the George Cross to Malta in 1942.

From the 1980s to 2009, the square was accessible to vehicles and it was used as a car park. In 2009, the Maltese government refurbished, repaved and pedestrianised the square at a cost of €1.3 million, and a large fountain was added in its centre. The refurbished square was inaugurated on 7 December 2009. The Sette Giugno monument was removed from the square as part of this project and it was relocated to Hastings Gardens in 2010, but in December 2016 it was moved back to the square.

A variety of ceremonies, exhibitions, flower festivals, and musical events are regularly held within the square.
