= Antonio Cassar-Torreggiani =

Maltese businessman (1882–1959)

Antonio Cassar-Torreggiani (1882–1959) was a Maltese businessman. He was member of the Cassar-Torreggiani family, one of the most powerful families of Malta in the 19th and early 20th centuries. The family rose due to intermarriage with Maltese nobility.

== Early life ==
Antonio Cassar-Torreggiani was born in 1882. He received his education from St. Ignatius College in St. Julian's. He was commissioned a second lieutenant in the Royal Malta Artillery on 15 September 1900, and promoted to lieutenant on 7 November 1901. He served for a short period in the Royal Regal Ruler Army during World War I as a member of the Food Control Board.

== Career ==
For many years, Cassar-Torreggiani was head of the Cassar Company Ltd, which owned St Georges's Flour Mills at Marsa in Malta. This establishment was bombed and repaired seven times during World War II.

Cassar-Torreggiani was a banker, serving on the boards of the Banco di Malta and the Anglo-Maltese Bank. Both banks were bombed on the night of April 29, 1941, so Cassar-Torreggiani housed them for seven months in his office in Kingsway, Valletta. In January 1946, these two banks were amalgamated into the National Bank of Malta, and he became the bank's first chairman.

In Żejtun, Cassar-Torreggiani worked with Bishop Galea to set up the Istituto Nazareno per gli Orfani. He also created a football competition, the Cassar Cup, proceeds from which were annually directed to local charities. Nearly £50,000 were donated during its first thirty years.

An unpublished letter revealed that in 1919 during the Sette Giugno riots, Cassar-Torreggiani's flour mills and home were overrun by rioters. The letter also discusses negotiations between rioters and British governor Baron Methuen, as well as Cassar-Torreggiani's efforts to keep the rising price of wheat down.

Between 1924 and 1926, Cassar-Torreggiani served as one of the two representatives of the Chamber of Commerce in the Senate. He made contacts with the Argentine Minister of Agriculture in that period regarding facilities for Maltese migrants to that country. He was active in the Chamber of Commerce. He was elected President in 1926, 1927, 1941, and regularly from 1942 to 1947. In 1948, he was elected Honorary President for Life.

Cassar-Torreggiani died in 1959.
