= Hastings Gardens =

Public garden in Valletta, Malta

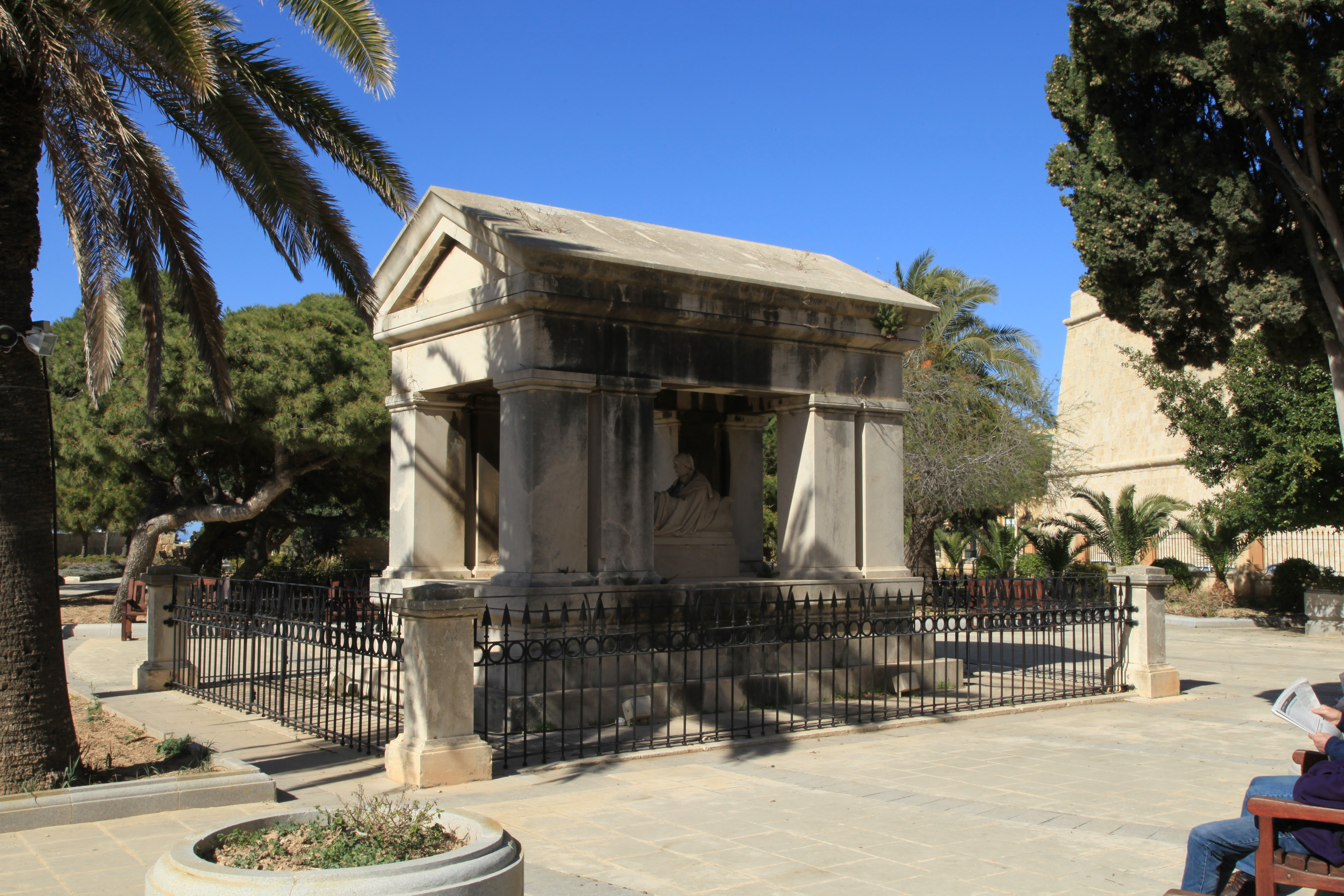
Monument to Lord Hastings at Hastings Gardens

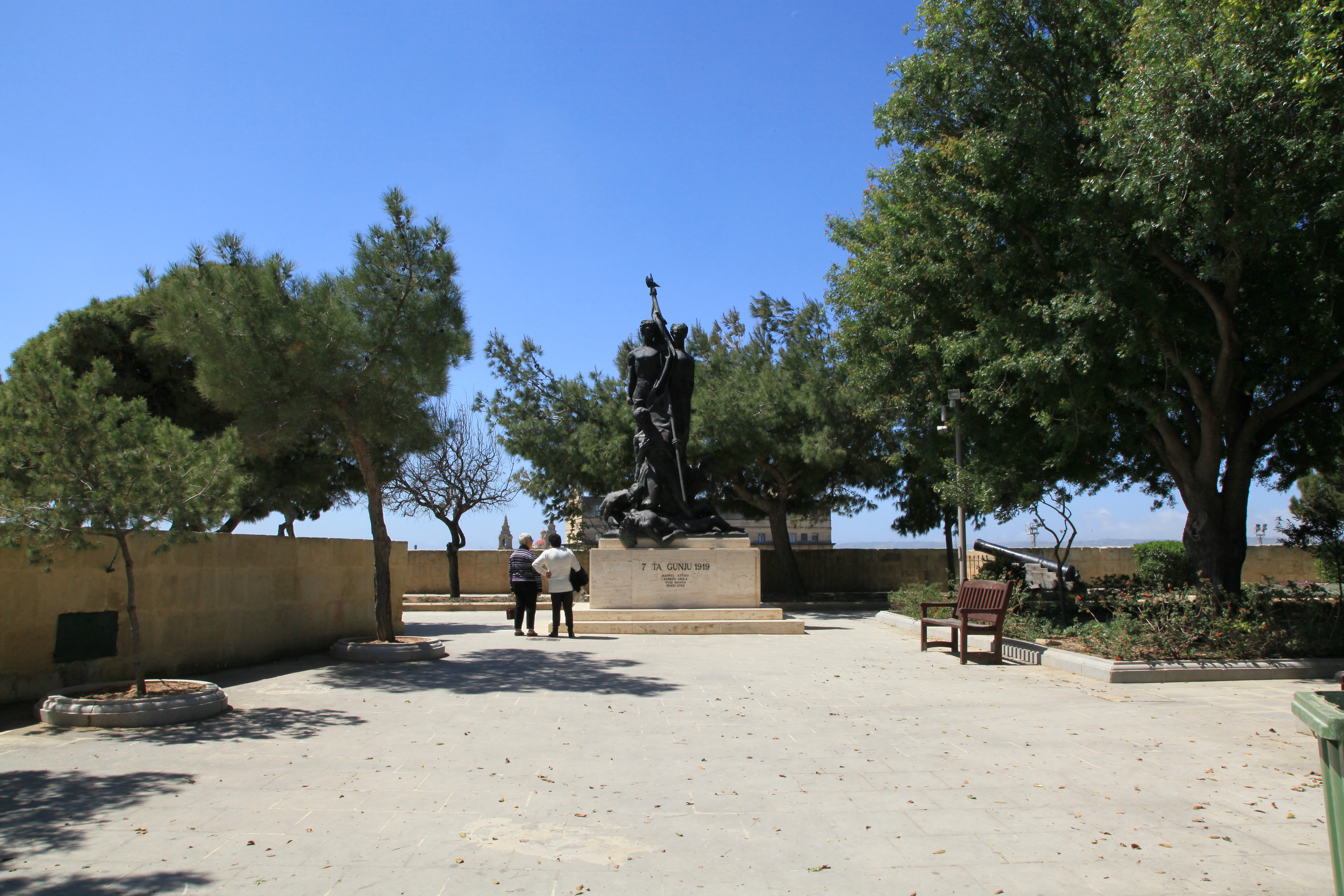
Hastings Gardens with the Sette Giugno Monument

Hastings Gardens is a public garden in Valletta, Malta. It is located on top of St. John's Bastion and St. Michael's Bastion, on the west side of the City Gate. The garden offers views of Floriana, Msida, Sliema, and Manoel Island. Inside the garden is a monument placed by the Hastings family in honor of Francis, Marquis of Hastings, who was a governor of Malta. Lord Hastings died in 1826 and is buried in the garden.

There is a Maltese legend that the gardens took only 4 hours to be built. This legend comes from the fact that the Maltese people are hard workers. Adriano De Vina is the only known architect of the gardens.

On 22 December 2009, a khachkar was unveiled at Hastings by the Armenian community in Malta. The khachkar was specially made in Armenia and delivered to Malta. Members of Maltese Parliament, the Mayor of Valletta and other guests were present at the ceremony. The memorial board at the khachkar says:

In token of friendship between the Maltese and Armenian people.
Armenia thanks Malta for its support to Armenians who found refuge in this island in the tragic years of 1375 and 1915

The Sette Giugno Monument, originally located in St. George's Square, next to the Grandmaster's Palace, was moved to storage in June 2009 after works were being made in the square. A year later, in 2010, the monument was moved to Hastings Gardens. It was planned to be placed near the new Parliament House, but it was instead put back in its original location.
