= Lower Barrakka Gardens =

Park in Valletta, Malta

Coordinates: 35°53′51″N 14°31′4″E

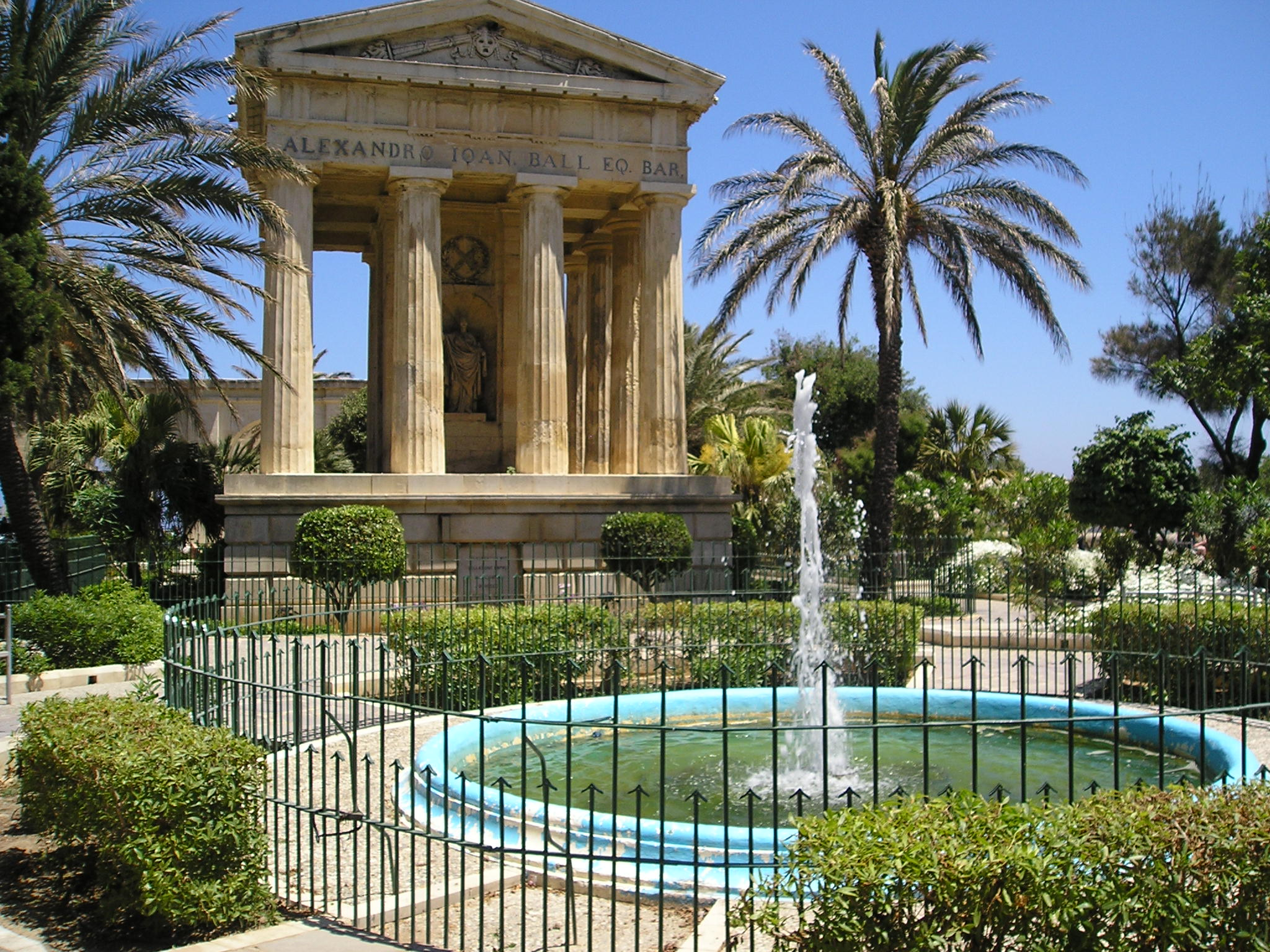
Lower Barrakka Gardens

The Lower Barrakka Gardens (Maltese: Il-Barrakka t'Isfel) are a public garden in Valletta, Malta, twinned with the Upper Barrakka Gardens in the same city.

The gardens have a view of the Grand Harbour and the breakwater. It includes the Monument to Sir Alexander Ball, which is a prominent feature in the form of a neoclassical temple located in the centre of the garden. In addition, the terrace area features various commemorative plaques dedicated to, amongst others, the Hungarian revolution of 1956, the Prague spring, Giuseppe Garibaldi and the 50th anniversary of the European Union. There is also a statue.

== Monument and Restoration ==
At the centre of the Lower Barrakka Gardens stands the Monument to Sir Alexander Ball, a neoclassical temple built in 1810 to honour Malta’s first British Civil Commissioner. The monument was restored in the 1880s, while the gardens and surrounding arcades were extensively rebuilt during the 1980s.

Further works were carried out in the early 2000s by the Malta Centre for Restoration, with the gardens reopening in 2003 following a major rehabilitation project.

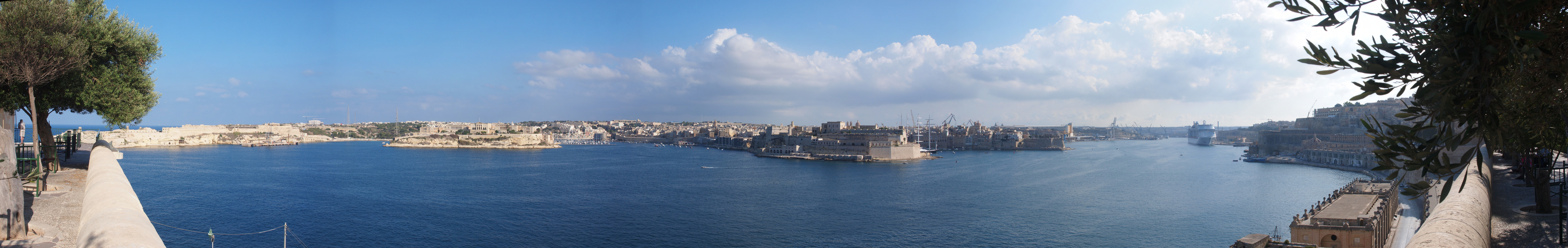
View of the Grand Harbour from the garden's terrace
