= Fortifications Interpretation Centre =

The Fortress Builders – Fortifications Interpretation Centre

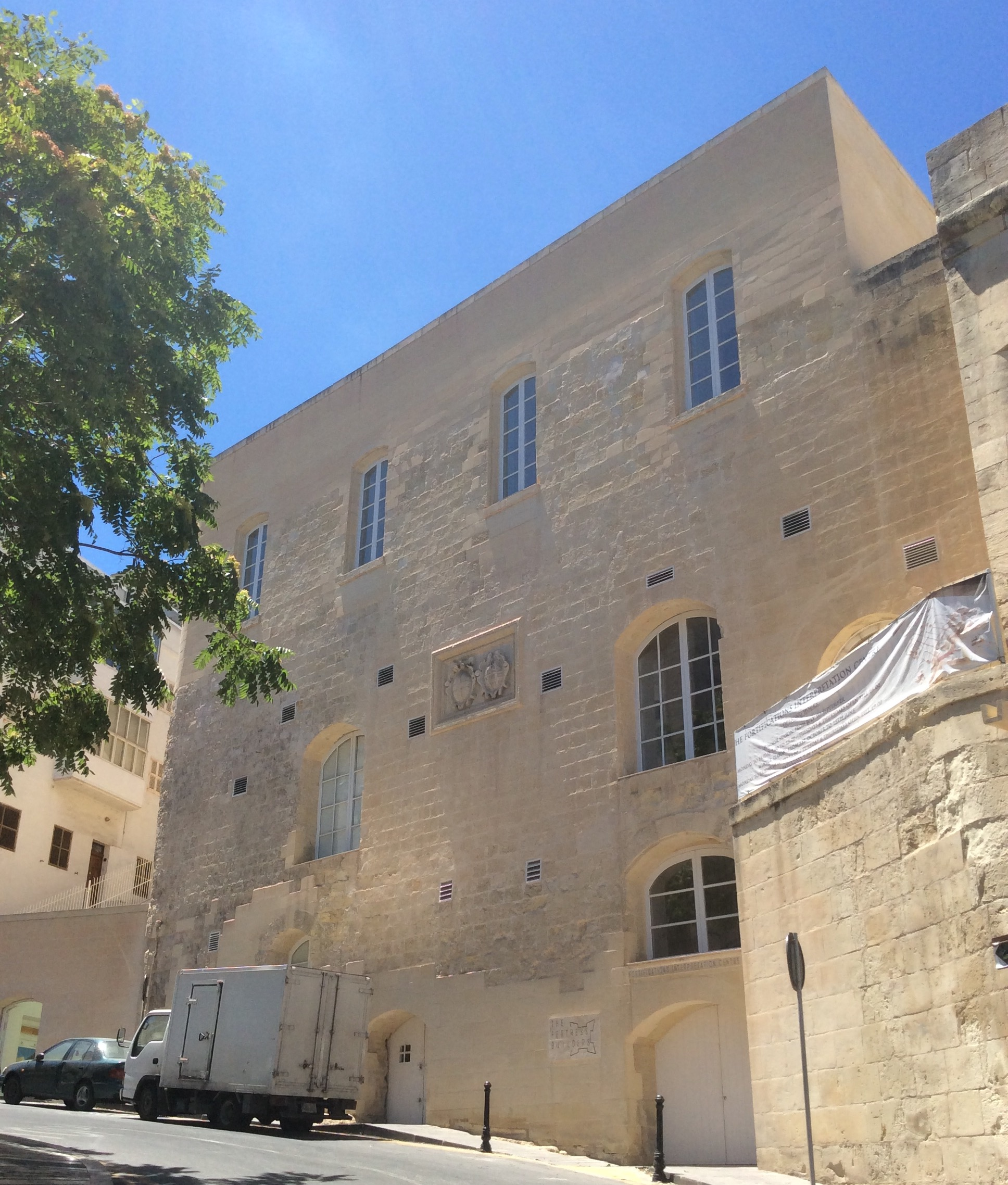
- Established: 16 February 2013
- Location: Valletta, Malta
- Coordinates: 35°53′58″N 14°30′33″E
- Type: Interpretation centre
- Curator: Stephen C. Spiteri
- Owner: Government of Malta
- Website: Official website

The Fortress Builders – Fortifications Interpretation Centre (FIC) is an interpretation centre about the fortifications of Malta. It is housed in a late 16th-century warehouse located near the St. Andrew's Bastion in Valletta, Malta. The centre was opened in 2013, and it aims at communicating Malta's military architecture in an interactive way.

The building was formerly known as the Biagio Steps Examination Centre.

== History ==
The idea to establish a museum about Malta's military architecture goes back to the 1960s, when British architect Quentin Hughes proposed to set up such a museum in Fort San Lucian. Military historian Stephen C. Spiteri also made plans to establish a military architecture museum, and he proposed setting it up at the Ospizio in Floriana. In November 2008, the Ministry for Resources and Rural Affairs under Minister George Pullicino took the initiative of setting up the museum at the former Biagio Steps Examination Centre in Valletta. The project was led by Spiteri.

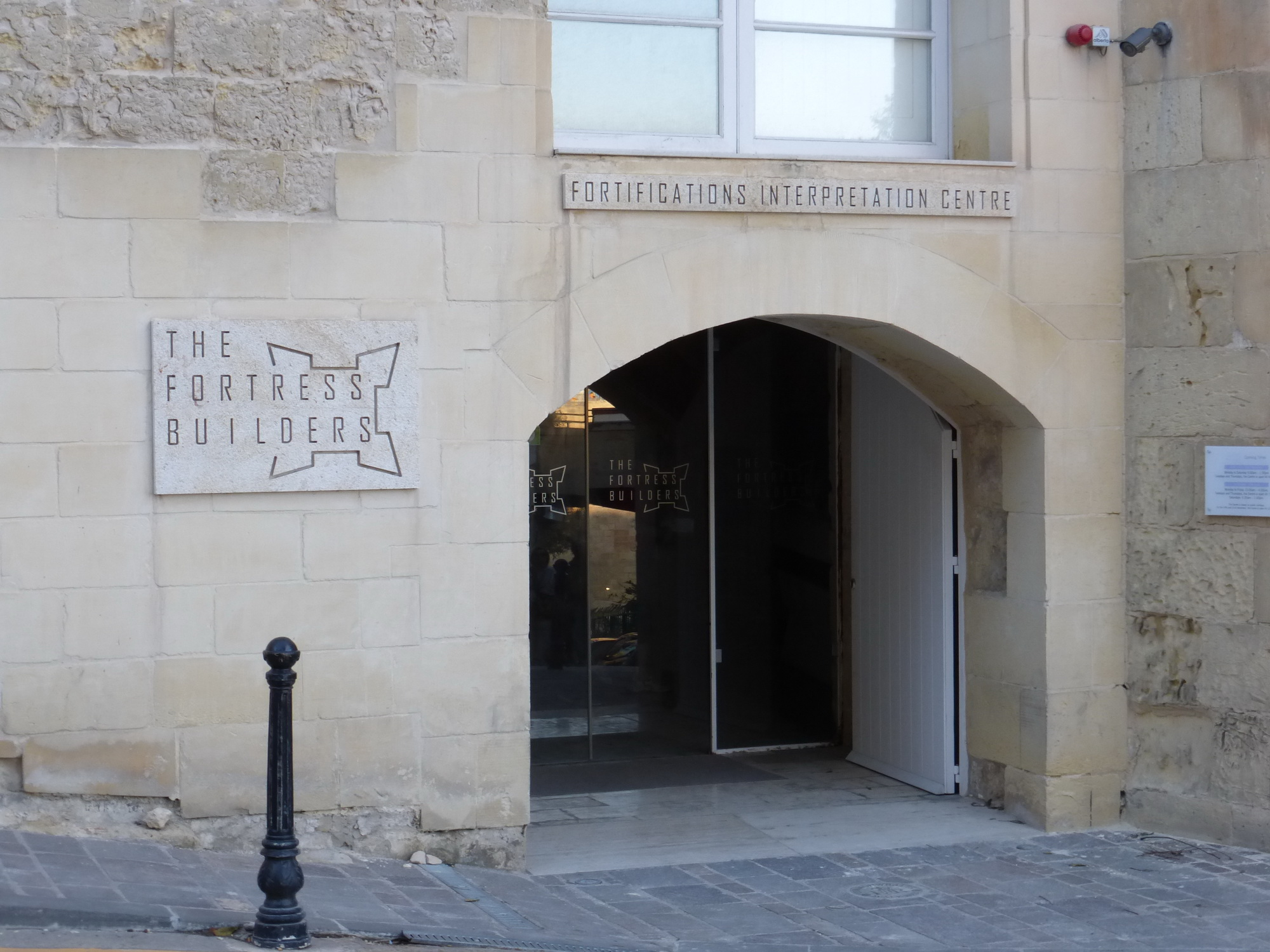
Entrance to the FIC

Works to convert the former examination hall began in 2010 under the direction of the architect Norbert Gatt, and the completion date was set to be sometime in 2011. The project was originally expected to cost €436,000, but it eventually amounted to €1.7 million. 85% of the funds were provided by the European Regional Development Fund.

The centre was opened by Prime Minister Lawrence Gonzi on 16 February 2013. It is run by the Restoration Directorate of the Ministry for Resources and Rural Affairs, and its curator is Stephen C. Spiteri.

The conversion of the dilapidated warehouse into the centre won the Din l-Art Ħelwa Silver Medal Award in 2012, and the centre was awarded a Certificate of Excellence by TripAdvisor in 2015.

== The building ==
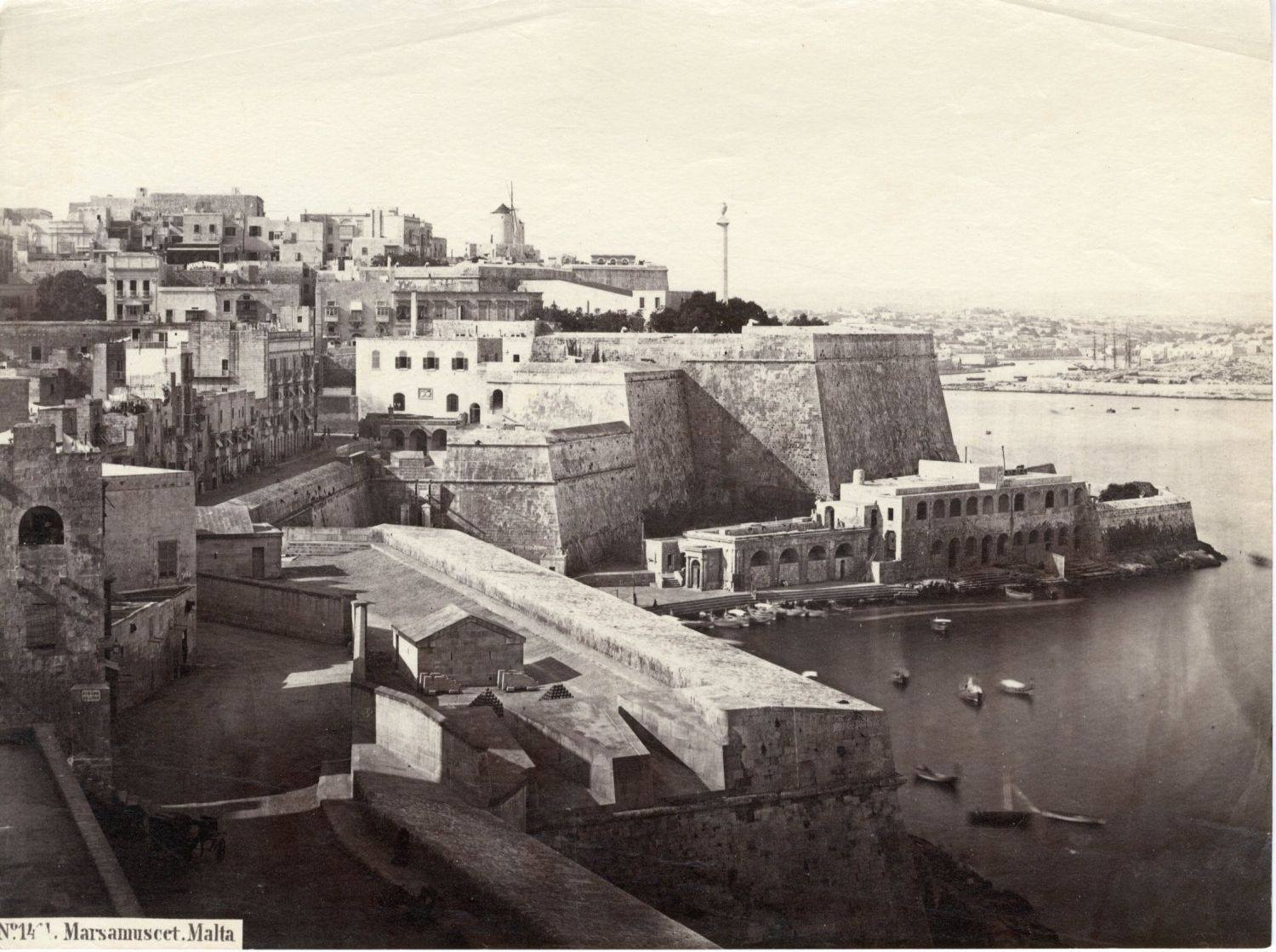
The building (centre) in 1860; photo by Giorgio Sommer

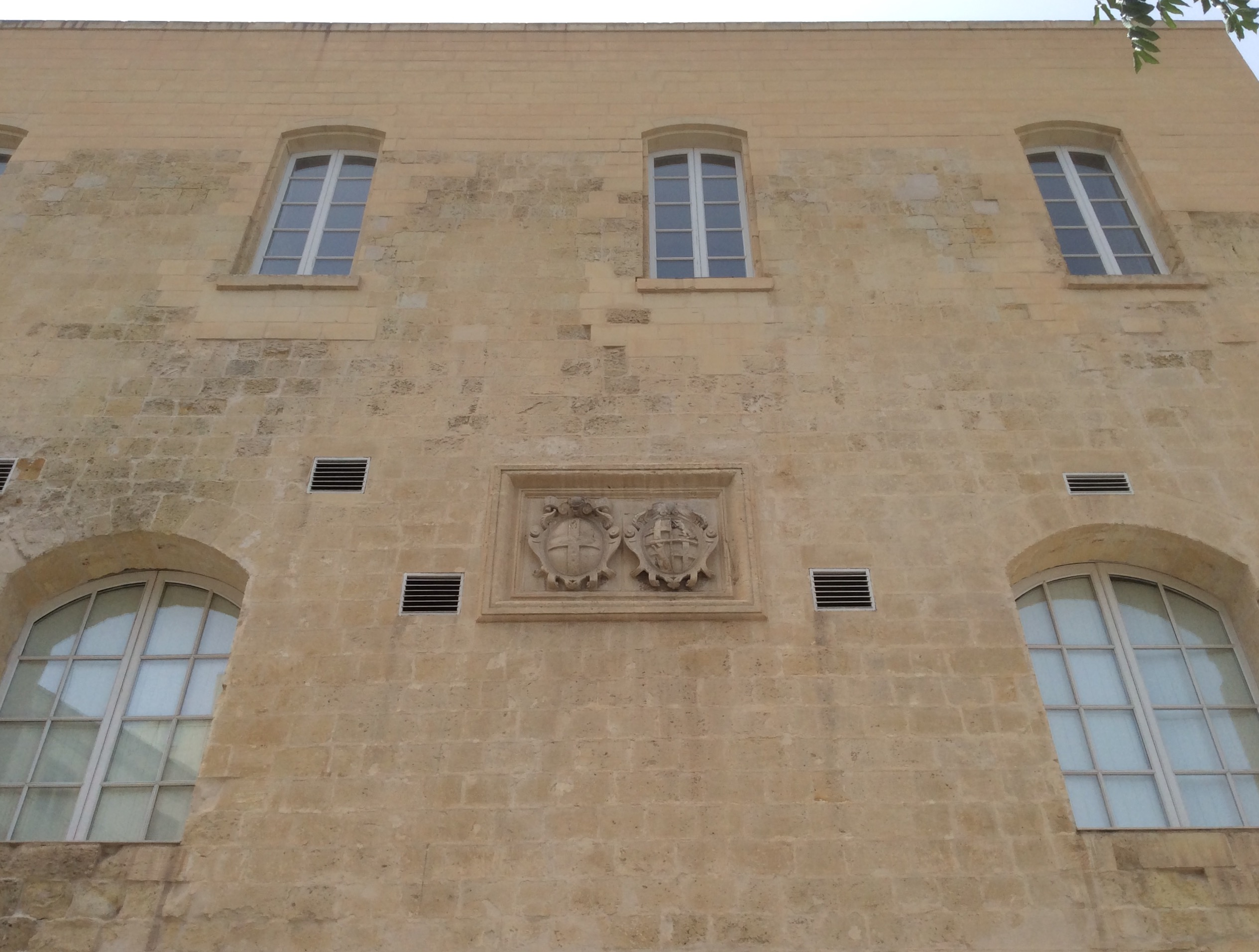
Façade of the FIC, with the coat of arms of Hugues Loubenx de Verdalle in the centre

The FIC is housed in a large 16th-century building located at St. Mark's Street in Valletta, close to St. Andrew's Bastion and the now-demolished Marsamxett Gate. It has a plain façade adorned with the coat of arms of Grand Master Hugues Loubenx de Verdalle, suggesting that the building was built sometime between 1582 and 1595. The building's original purpose is not known, but it might have been a bombproof magazine or warehouse. The upper floor was used as an artillery school (Italian: scuola per gettare bombe).

The upper floor of the building was damaged by aerial bombardment in World War II and its roof was subsequently demolished. The rest of the structure was later used as an examination hall known as the Biagio Steps Examination Centre. At some points it was also used as a rehearsal space.

The building was chosen to house the FIC because of its large interior spaces and its location adjoining the fortifications of Valletta. Between 2010 and 2013, the building was restored and its upper floor was rebuilt, while an annexe was constructed. The new parts of the building were built in line with sustainable principles. It has been re constructed due to fails in the rocks.

== Display and exhibits ==
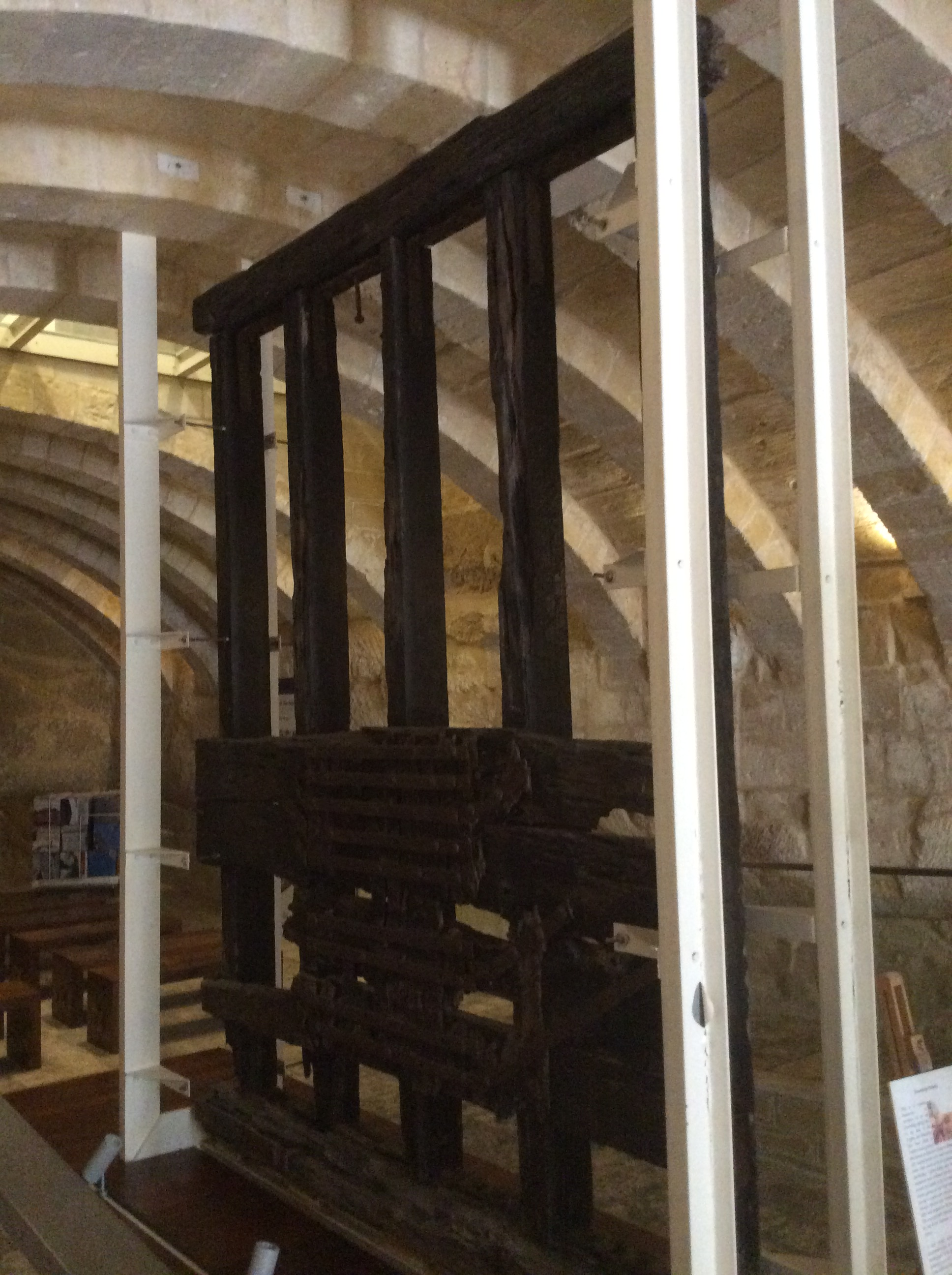
17th-century drawbridge of Valletta's Porta Reale (scheduled as Class B)

The Fortifications Interpretation Centre contains exhibits relating to both military architecture in general as well as the various fortifications of Malta, starting from the Bronze Age walls at Borġ in-Nadur to the pillboxes built by the British in World War II. Exhibits include a number of detailed scale models, which are presented along with audio-visual presentations and informative charts. A few artifacts, such as a 17th-century drawbridge that was probably originally installed at Valletta's Porta Reale, are also displayed. The bridge is scheduled with a status of Class B.

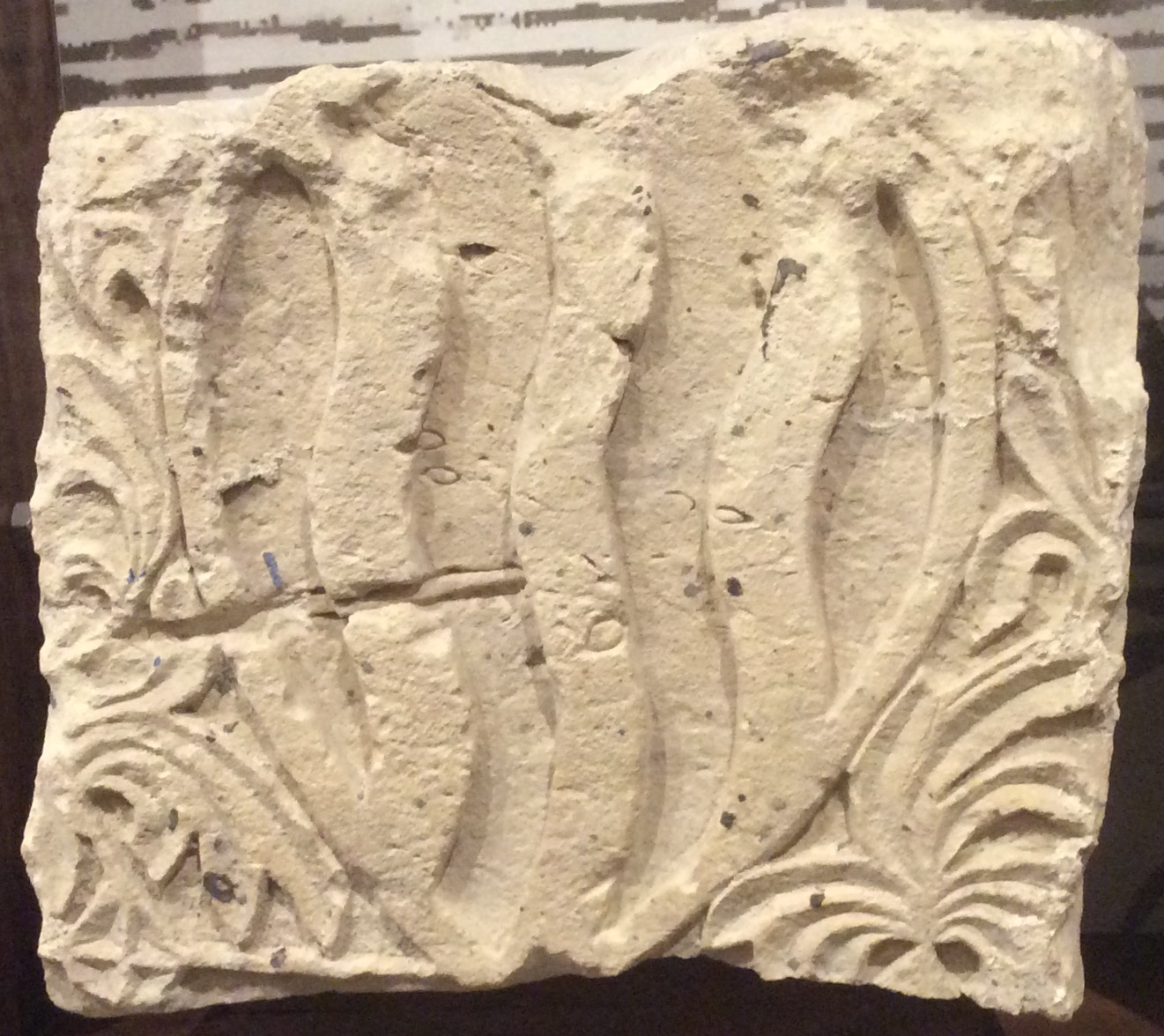
Medieval stone block bearing the coat of arms of Guglielmo Murina, discovered at Mdina in 2012

The centre also contains a lecture hall and a reference library, which are intended for researchers. Another section is dedicated to children. The centre occasionally houses art exhibitions.

The centre is open everyday except for Sundays and public holidays. As from 2020, visiting costs €2 per person.

== See also ==
- Wignacourt Tower, another museum about Malta's fortifications
