= Mount Carmel Hospital =

Mount Carmel Hospital may refer to:

- Mount Carmel Community Hospital, Churchtown, Dublin, Ireland
- Mount Carmel Hospital, Attard Malta
