= Alziro Bergonzo =

Italian architect and painter

- Born: 30 December 1906; Bergamo, Italy
- Died: 22 May 1997 (aged 90); Milan, Italy
- Education: Polytechnic University of Milan
- Occupation: Architect
- Notable work: Casa Littoria (now Casa della Libertà), Bergamo
- Style: Italian rationalism
- Father: Luigi Bergonzo

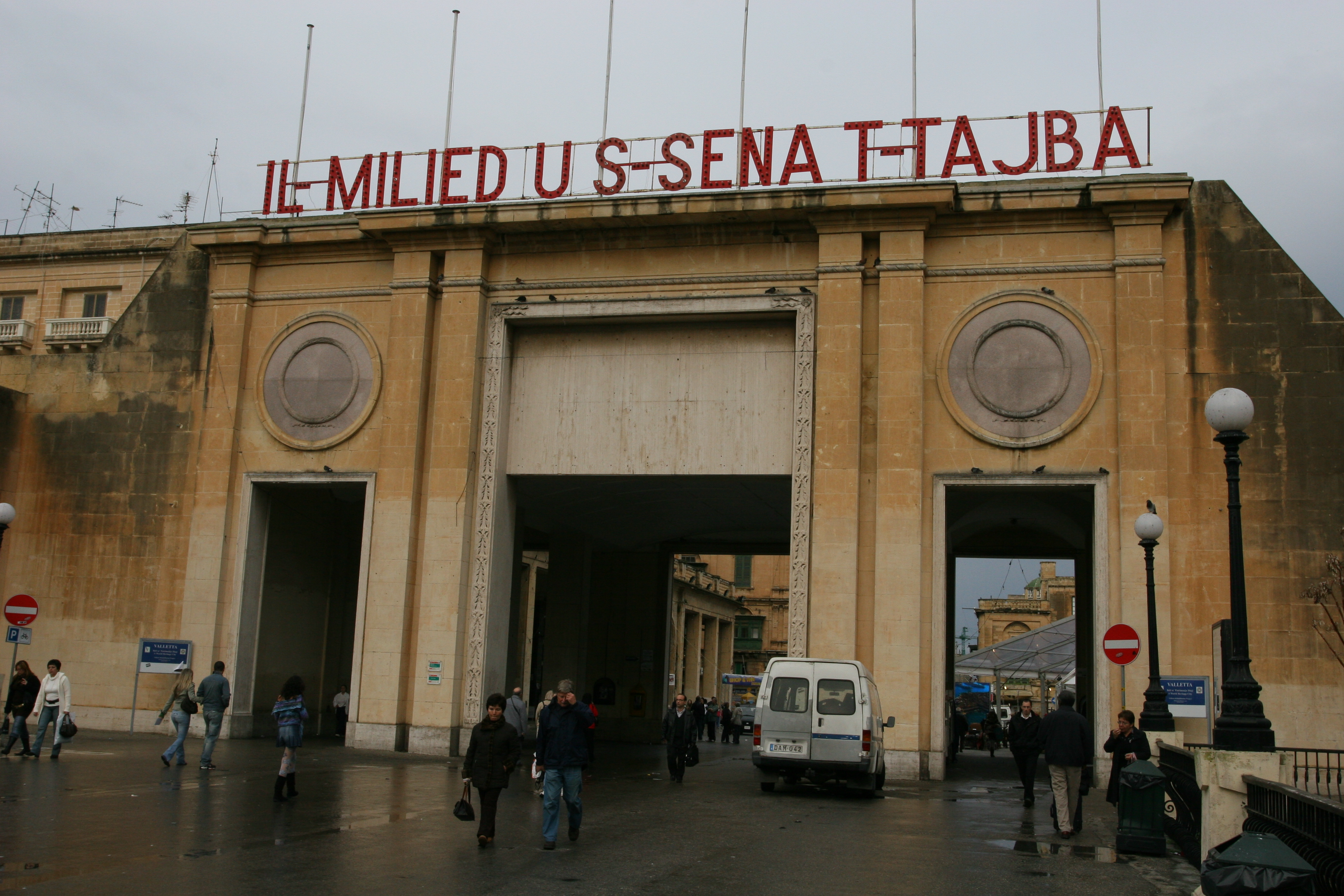
The fourth City Gate of Valletta, Malta, which was designed by Bergonzo and built in 1964–65. It was demolished in 2011.

Alziro Bergonzo (30 December 1906 – 22 May 1997) was an Italian architect and painter. His primary style was the rationalized Stile Littorio.

He was the son of Luigi Bergonzo, an engineering graduate from Bern who had moved to Bergamo in the early 1900s. He studied at the Liceo Sarpi, before enrolling at the Faculty of Architecture at the Polytechnic University of Milan in 1925, where he met Franco Albini and Giancarlo Palanti. His studies were interrupted by military service, but he graduated in 1933.

He worked in his father's established studio, which helped him get to know directly other renowned professionals and artists in the field of decoration. The quality of his early work was noted and he began to receive commissions from various public and private clients, most often in Bergamo.

When World War II broke out, he moved his studio to Rome, where he participated in the competition of the EU42 and collaborated with Luigi Moretti for the Foro Italico.

After the war, he was purged from the professional register for political reasons, but in 1946 he was reinstated and won a competition for the Lido di Venezia. Bergonzo's post-war work includes the Casa Trussardi in Bergammo, the Teatro Manzoni in Milan, port works in Saudi Arabia, and a theatre in Cairo. He also designed the fourth City Gate of Valletta, Malta in the mid-1960s.

After designing many public works, Bergonzo began to reserve his projects for private clients, at the same time devoting some of his time to painting, especially in the last few years of his life. He died in Milan in 1997, shortly after the opening of his last major work, the new Piazza della Libertà in Bergamo.

== Works ==
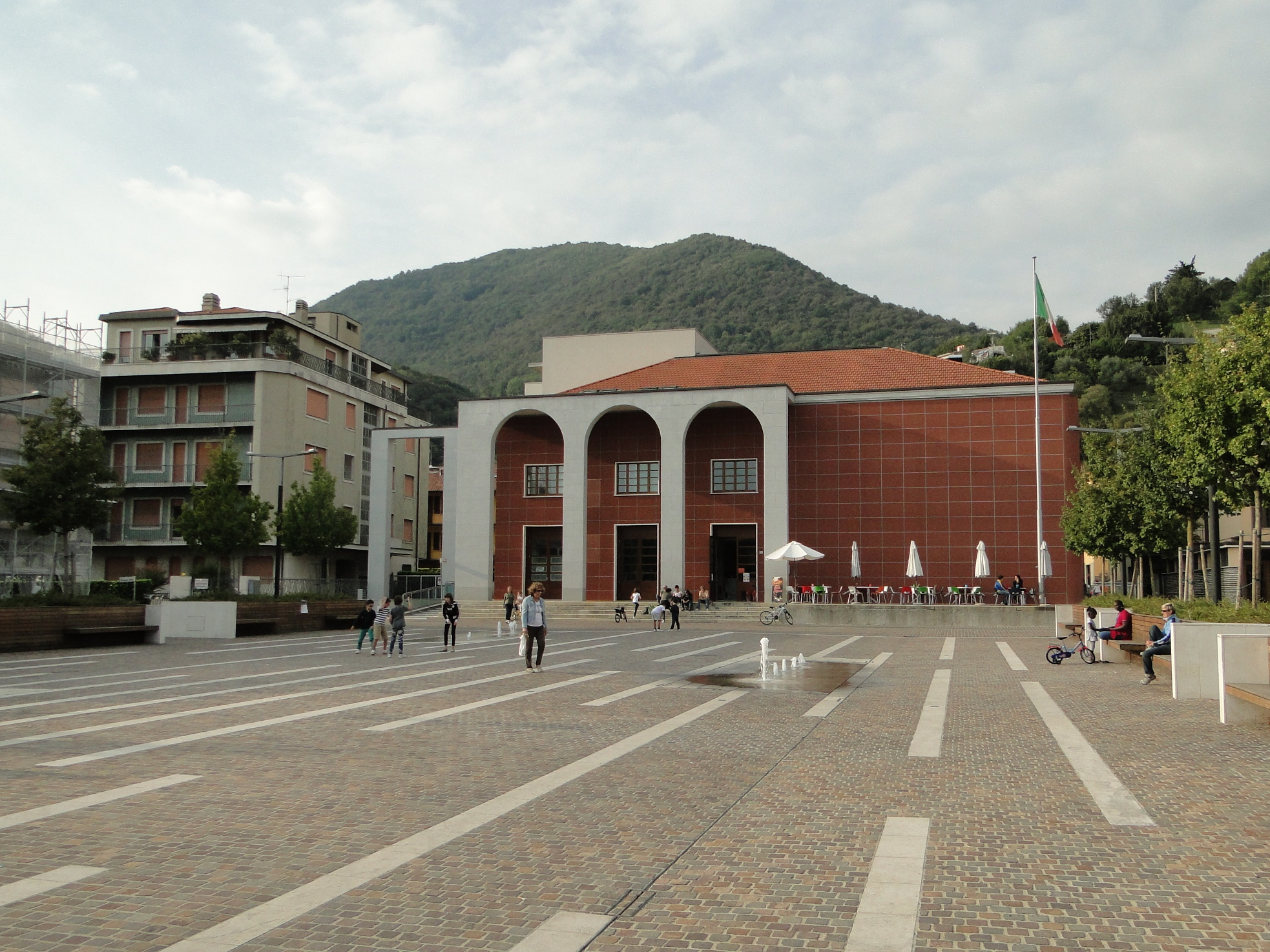
Casa dell'ONB, today auditorium Modernissimo, Nembro, 1936

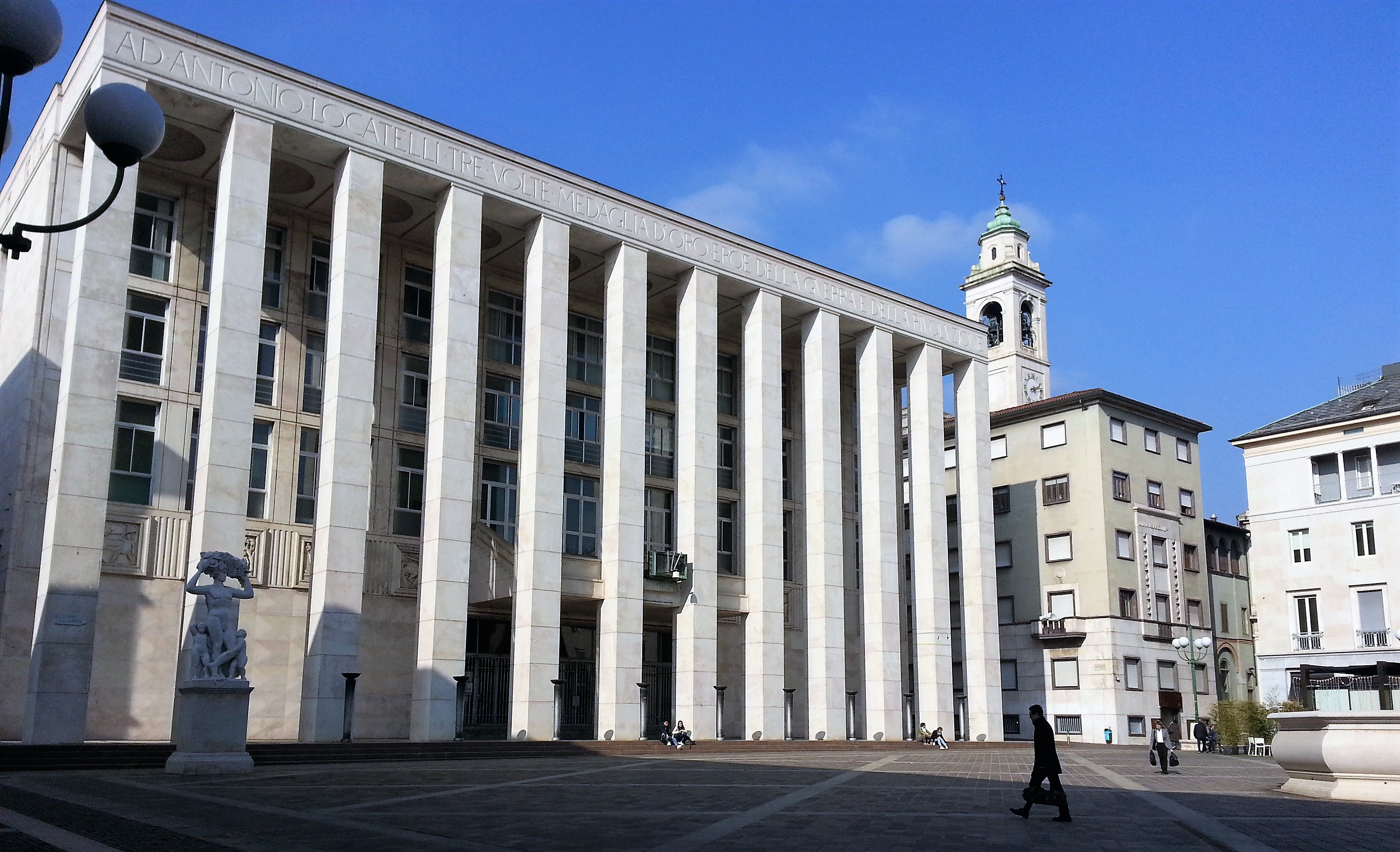
Casa Littoria, today Palazzo della Libertà, Bergamo, 1939

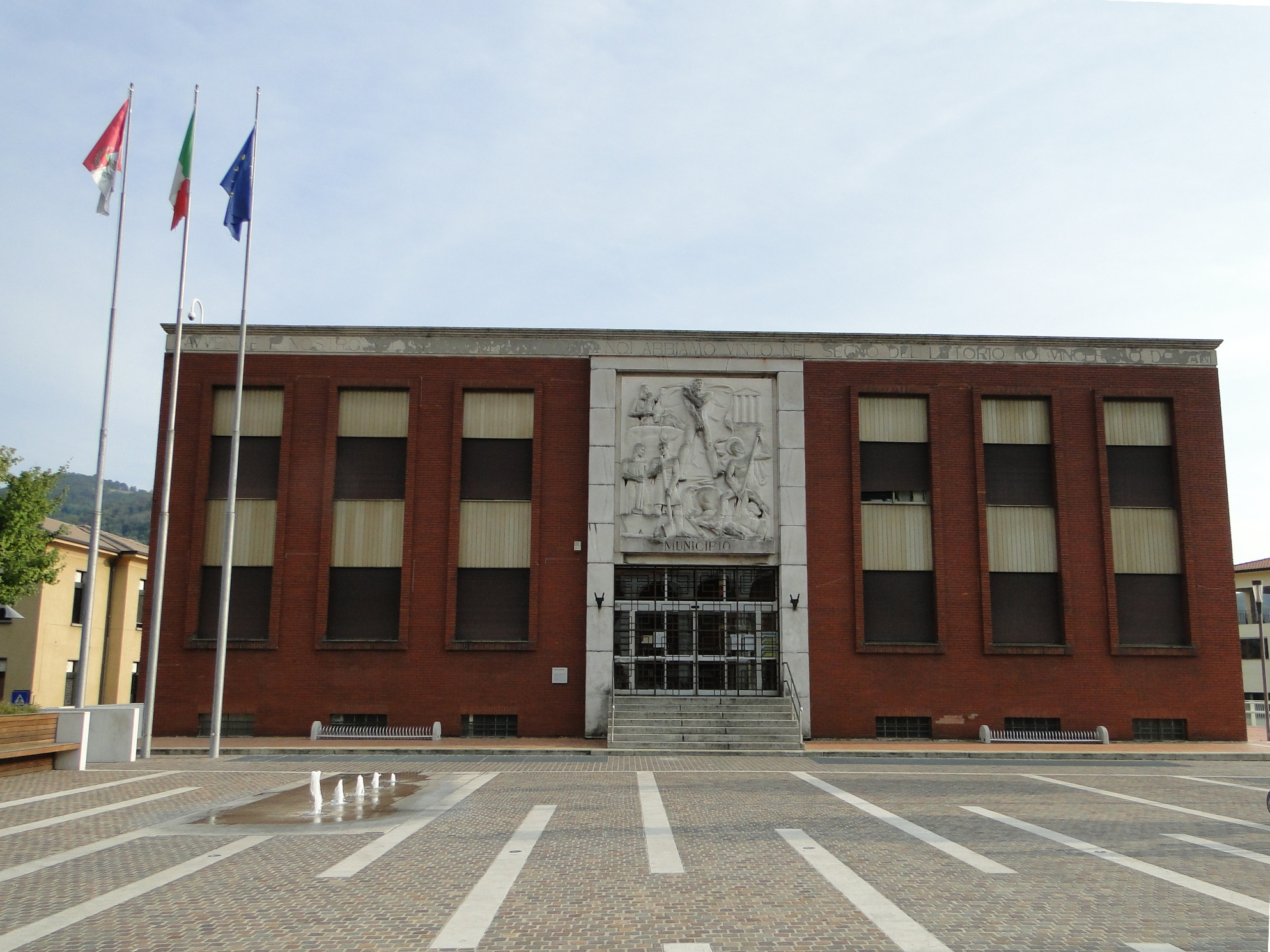
Casa del Fascio, Nembro, 1940

- Hotel Franceschetti, passo Presolana (1929)
- Casa Pellegrini, Bergamo (1932–33)
- Casa del Balilla, Bergamo (1932)
- Fountain of Porta Nuova, Bergamo (1935)
- Colonia elioterapica, Palazzolo sull'Oglio (1935–36)
- Casa del Fascio, Caravaggio (1935–37)
- Casa del'Opera Nazionale Balilla (now Auditorium Modernissimo), Nembro (1936)
- Casa Littoria (now Casa della Libertà), Bergamo (1937–40)
- Municipio, Palazzo Italo Balbo, Nembro (1940)
- Torre dei Venti, casello autostradale di Bergamo (1940–41)
- Casa Trussardi, Bergamo alta (1945)
- Teatro Manzoni, Milan (1946–50)
- Palazzo dei congressi, Stresa (1956–57)
- Reggiani divisione tessile factory (extension), Bergamo (1957–66)
- Chiesa dei Tre Martiri, Rimini
- Fourth City Gate, Valletta, Malta (1964–65)
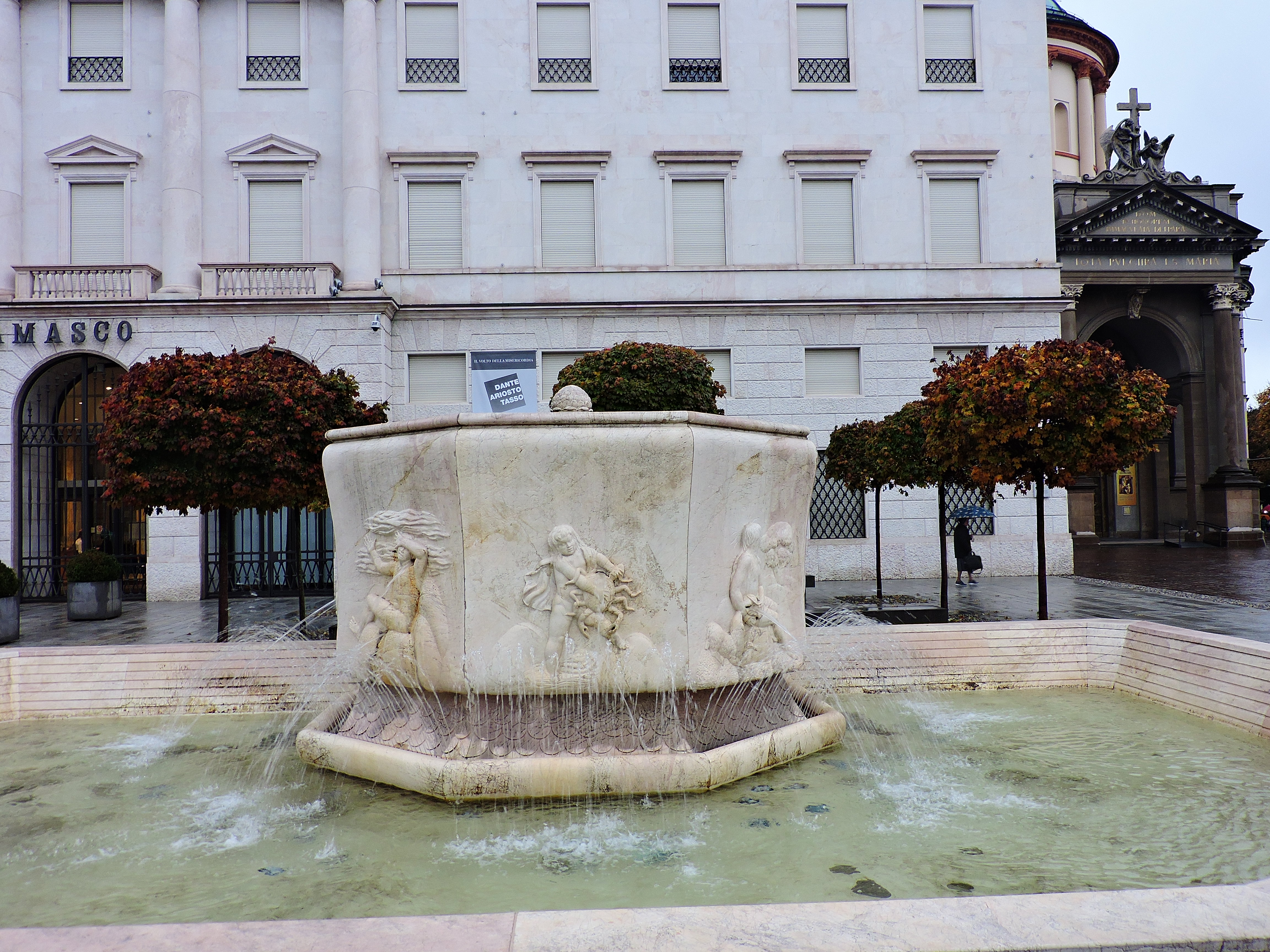
Fountain of Porta Nuova, Bergamo, 1935

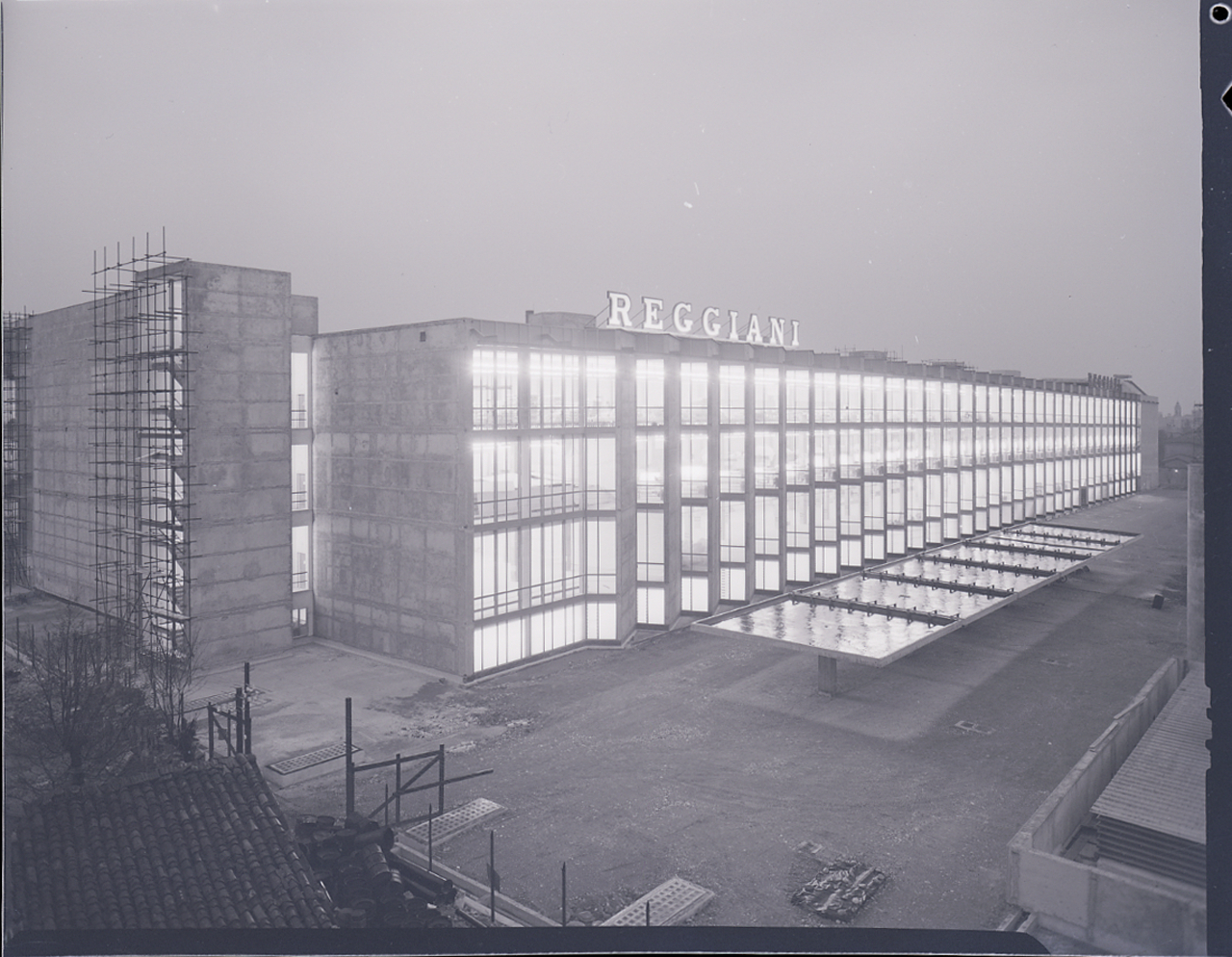
Extension of Reggiani divisione tessile factory, Bergamo, 1954-57 (photo by Paolo Monti)

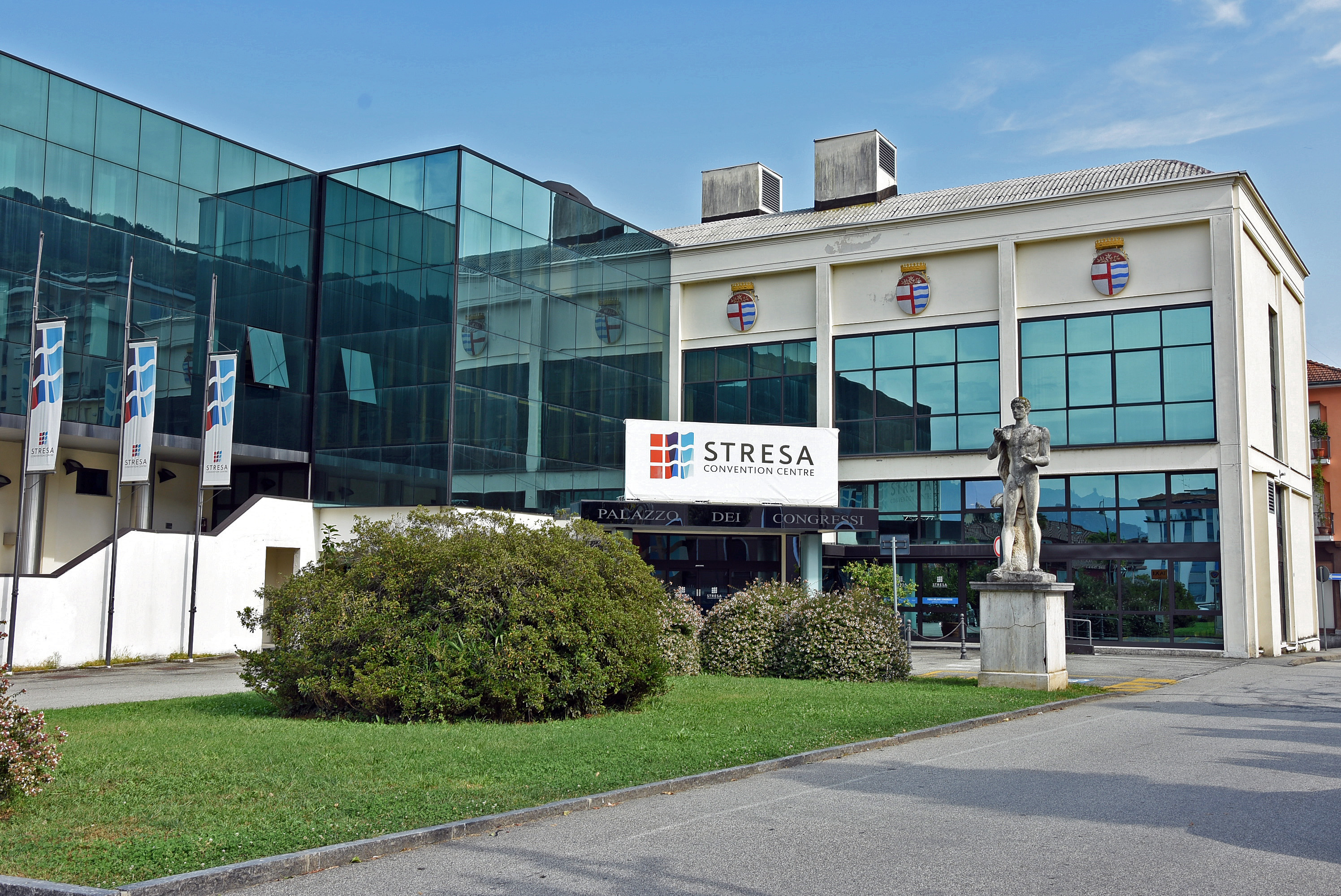
Palazzo Congressi, Stresa, 1956–57

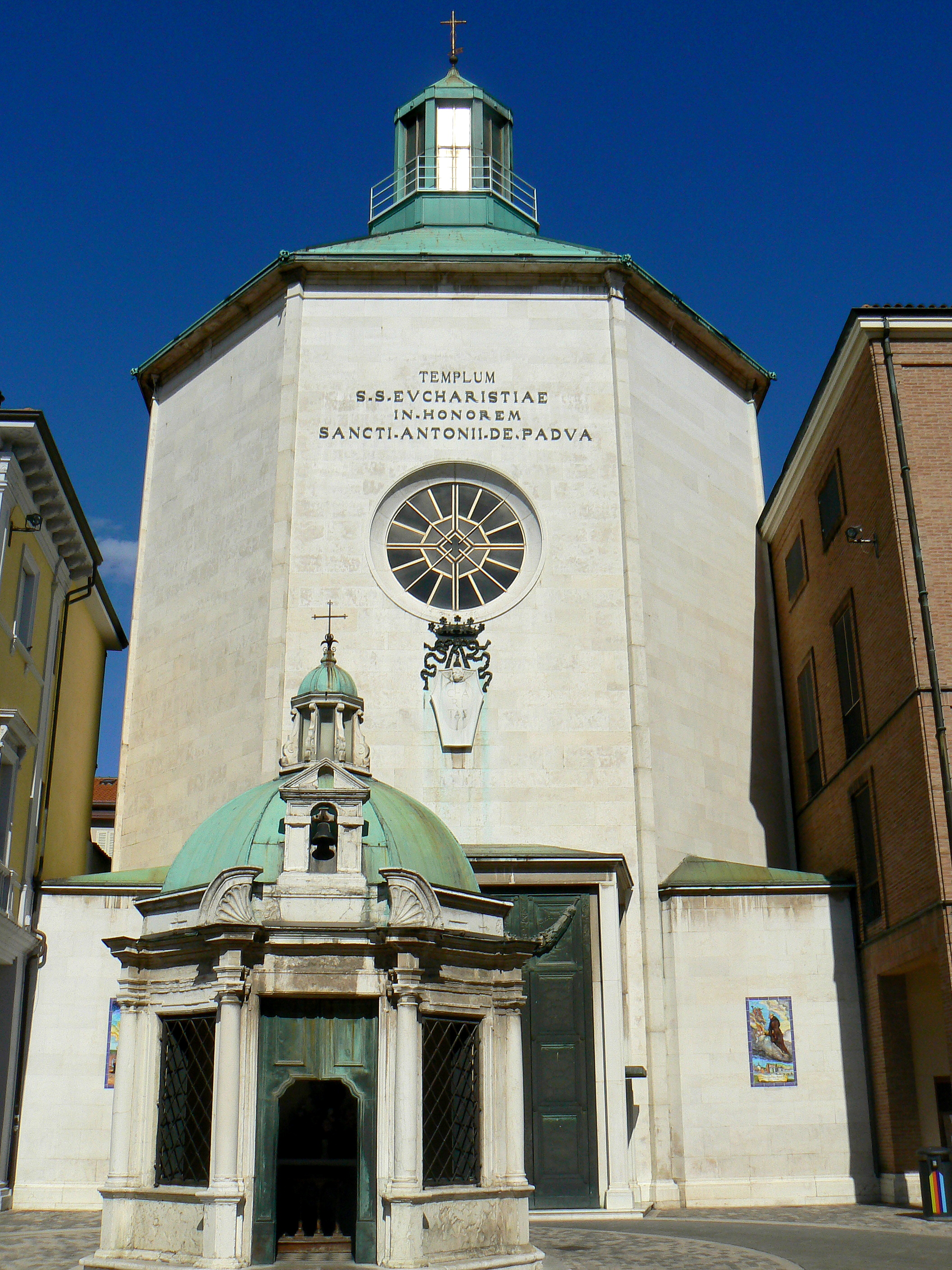
Church of Sant'Antonio, piazza Tre Martiri, Rimini, 1963
