= Villa Franconi =

Villa Franconi was an 18th-century residential building in Floriana, Malta which was repurposed as a mental hospital known as the Franconi Asylum from 1835 to 1861. The building was demolished in the late 19th century.

== History ==
Villa Franconi was constructed as the residence of Bali' Fra Fabrizio Franconi, a knight of the Order of St John who served in the Hospitaller fleet. Franconi made a petition for obtaining a free plot of land in Floriana on 24 January 1739, on which he initially built a small house with a garden. This was later expanded into a villa with a main facade along Strada Magazzeni.

The property later passed to the Mattei family, before being acquired by the British government on 30 September 1802. In 1835, the Commissioners of Charity made a proposal to establish a new mental asylum to replace the Ospizio, which had been deemed unsuitable for the care of mentally-ill patients. Villa Franconi was chosen as the site of the asylum, and structural alterations were made to the building including the addition of a padded cell.

The Franconi Asylum began to operate in September 1835 when 80 patients were transferred from the Ospizio; the number increased to 116 by the beginning of 1836. Patients with more severe cases of mental illness initially remained at the Ospizio but were also transferred in 1838, and during the same year the property was enlarged when an adjacent house was incorporated into it. By 1848, the asylum had reached its full capacity of 170 inmates.

Villa Franconi was located within a residential urban area, and neighbours reportedly teased and taunted the patients who were confined inside. Efforts to relocate the asylum began in 1851, and a proposal by Francesco Cianciolo was selected following a design competition. The new Asylum for the Insane (later renamed Mount Carmel Hospital) was subsequently constructed in the limits of Attard between 1853 and 1861, and the 253 patients housed in Villa Franconi were moved to the new asylum in July 1861.

Villa Franconi had been repurposed as an officer's mess by 1871, but it was demolished a couple of years later. Its site was split into twenty plots which were rebuilt as residential buildings.

The asylum gave rise to the metonym ta' Frankuni, which entered the Maltese vocabulary as a reference to mental hospitals.

== See also ==
- Villa Chelsea in Birkirkara
