= City Gate (Valletta) =

Entrance to the city of Valletta, Malta

- Bieb il-Belt
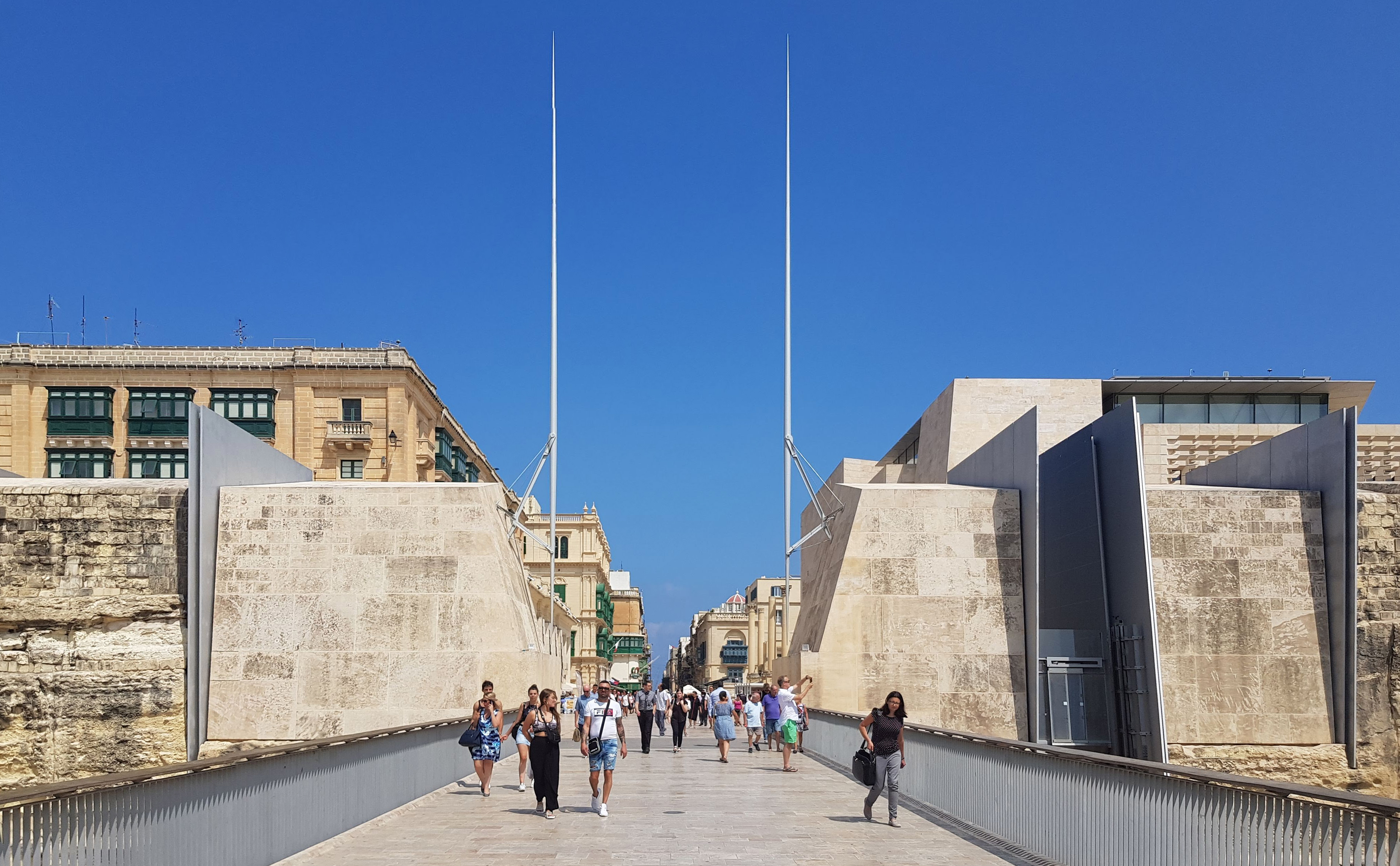
- City Gate in 2019
- Interactive map of the City Gate area

General information
- Status: Completed
- Type: Gate
- Location: Valletta, Malta
- Coordinates: 35°53′46″N 14°30′33″E
- Construction started: 2011
- Completed: 2014
- Owner: Government of Malta

Technical details
- Material: Limestone and steel

Design and construction
- Architect: Renzo Piano

City Gate (Maltese: Bieb il-Belt, literally "Door of the City") is a gate located at the entrance of Valletta, Malta. The present gate, which is the fifth one to have stood on the site, was built between 2011 and 2014 to designs of the Italian architect Renzo Piano.

The first gate which stood on the site was Porta San Giorgio, which was built in 1569 to designs of either Francesco Laparelli or Girolamo Cassar. The gate was renamed Porta Reale (Maltese: Putirjal) around 1586, before being rebuilt in 1633, probably to designs of Tommaso Dingli. It was briefly renamed Porte Nationale during the French occupation of Malta in 1798, but the name reverted to Porta Reale when Malta fell under British rule in 1800. In 1853, this was once again replaced by a larger gate, which was also known as Kingsgate or Kingsway. These first three gates were all fortified, forming part of Valletta's city walls. The gate was also informally called the Porta di terra (meaning "land gate") since it was the only landward approach to the city.

The last fortified gate was demolished in 1964, being replaced by a Rationalist gate designed by Alziro Bergonzo. This gate was then demolished in 2011, and it was replaced by Piano's gate which was completed in 2014.

== Location ==
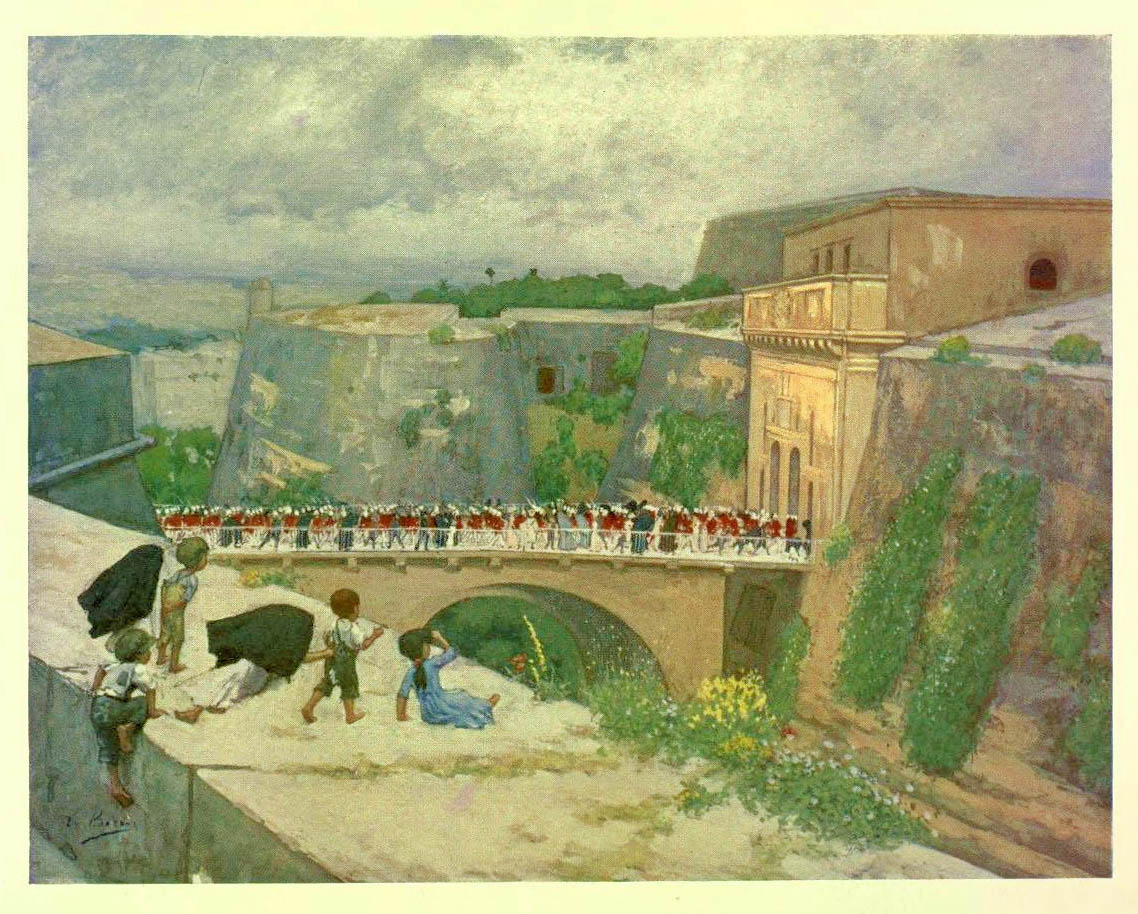
1910 painting of the bridge leading to City Gate

City Gate is located within the Porta Reale Curtain, a curtain wall at the centre of the Valletta Land Front, located between St. James' and St. John's Bastions. A bridge spanning across Valletta's deep ditch leads to the gate. The gate was originally protected by a couvre porte, an advanced ditch and a lunette known as St. Madeleine's Lunette. During British rule, the lunette was demolished and part of the advanced ditch filled in. The site was later occupied by the bus terminus, with the Triton Fountain at the centre. The square around the fountain has been converted into a pedestrian area.

The gate marks the beginning of Republic Street (Maltese: Triq ir-Repubblika), Valletta's main street which goes all the way until Fort Saint Elmo at the opposite end of the city. The buildings in the immediate vicinity of the City Gate include the Parliament House, the ruins of the Royal Opera House and the City Gate Shopping Arcade. Saint James Cavalier and Saint John's Cavalier are located on either side of the gate, near the Parliament House and shopping arcade respectively.

City Gate was one of the three gates leading to the city – the others being the Marsamxett Gate and Del Monte Gate, on the western and eastern extremities of the city. Marsamxett Gate was demolished in the early 20th century, while Del Monte Gate was replaced by Victoria Gate in 1885.

== History ==
=== First gate (1569–1633) ===
The original gate to Valletta was known as Porta San Giorgio, and was built during the reign of Grand Master Jean Parisot de Valette, after whom the city is named. Porta San Giorgio was possibly designed by Francesco Laparelli, the Italian military engineer who designed most of the fortifications of Valletta, or by his Maltese assistant Girolamo Cassar. Construction started in April 1566 and it was complete by 1569. The gate was rather plain in design, and was simply an unadorned small opening in the curtain walls.

A timber bridge originally linked Porta San Giorgio with the countryside across the ditch. Sometime before 1582, a stone bridge replaced the wooden one. The bridge itself was replaced a number of times, but its rock-hewn foundations remain intact and continue to support the present bridge.

In around 1586, during the reign of Grand Master Hugues Loubenx de Verdalle, the gate was renamed Porta Reale. In the late 16th century, a smaller outer gate was built and a triumphal arch was added above the original gate.

=== Second gate (1633–1853) ===
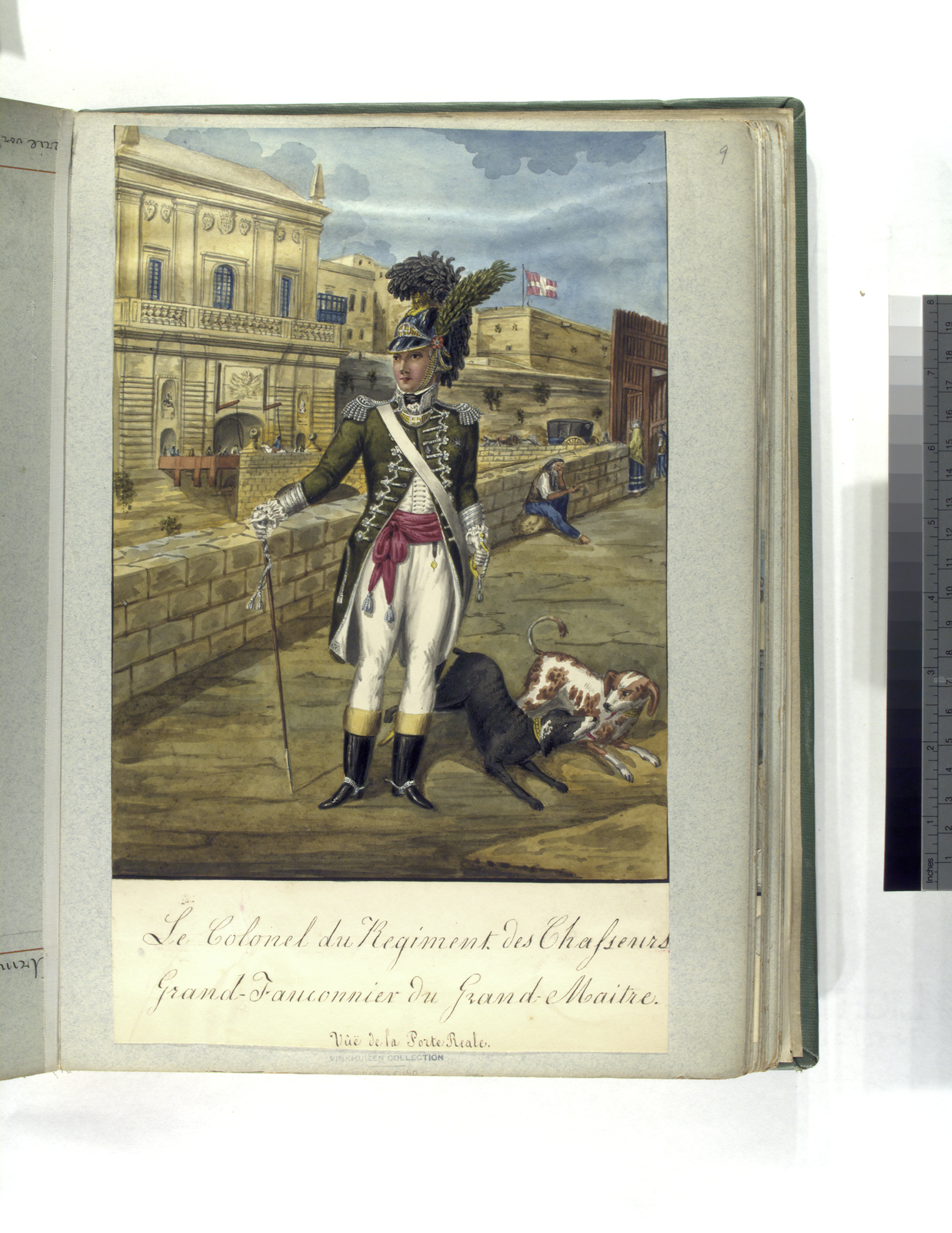
The second Porta Reale as seen in the background of an 18th century painting of a Hospitaller colonel

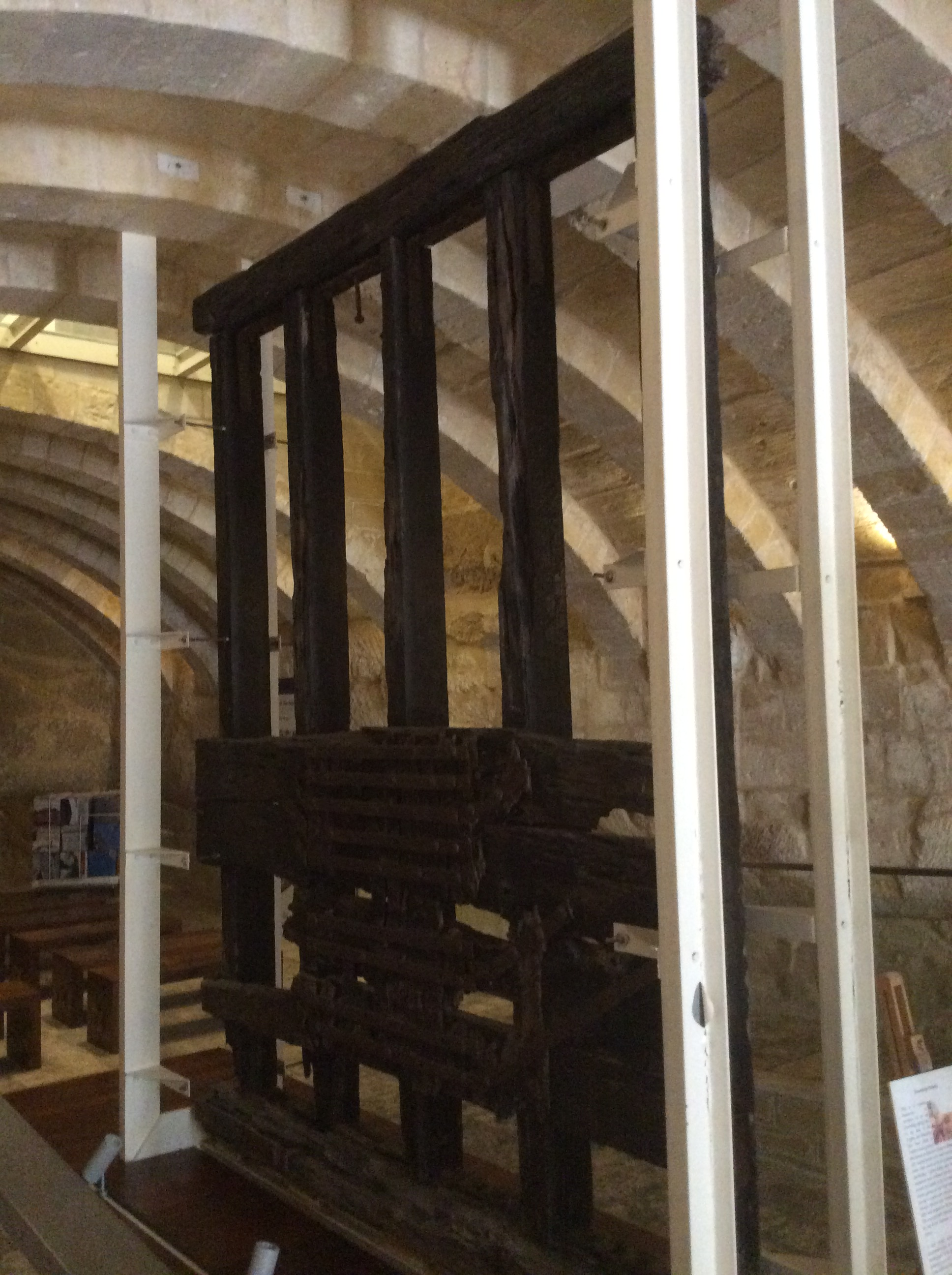
17th-century drawbridge believed to originate from the second city gate, now exhibited at the Fortifications Interpretation Centre

The second city gate was built in 1633, during the magistracy of Grand Master Antoine de Paule. This gate was more ornate than its predecessor Porta San Giorgio, and it consisted of a central archway with a smaller arch at each side, and a wooden drawbridge across the deep, dry ditch that lies immediately outside the city walls.

This gate is often attributed to the Maltese architect Tommaso Dingli, although there is no documentary evidence supporting this claim.

During the French occupation of Malta in 1798–1800, the gate was known as Porte Nationale. In accordance with Proclamation No. VI of 1814, which was issued by Governor Sir Thomas Maitland, the British coat of arms was installed at the gate in 1815. This coat of arms might have been the work of the sculptor Vincenzo Dimech.

The gate was modified over time, and by the late 18th and early 19th centuries there were a number of features which had not been part of Dingli's original design. The gate was demolished in 1853 since it was too small and had to be widened.

The remains of a 17th-century drawbridge believed to have been installed at Porta Reale are now exhibited at the Fortifications Interpretation Centre.

=== Third gate (1853–1964) ===
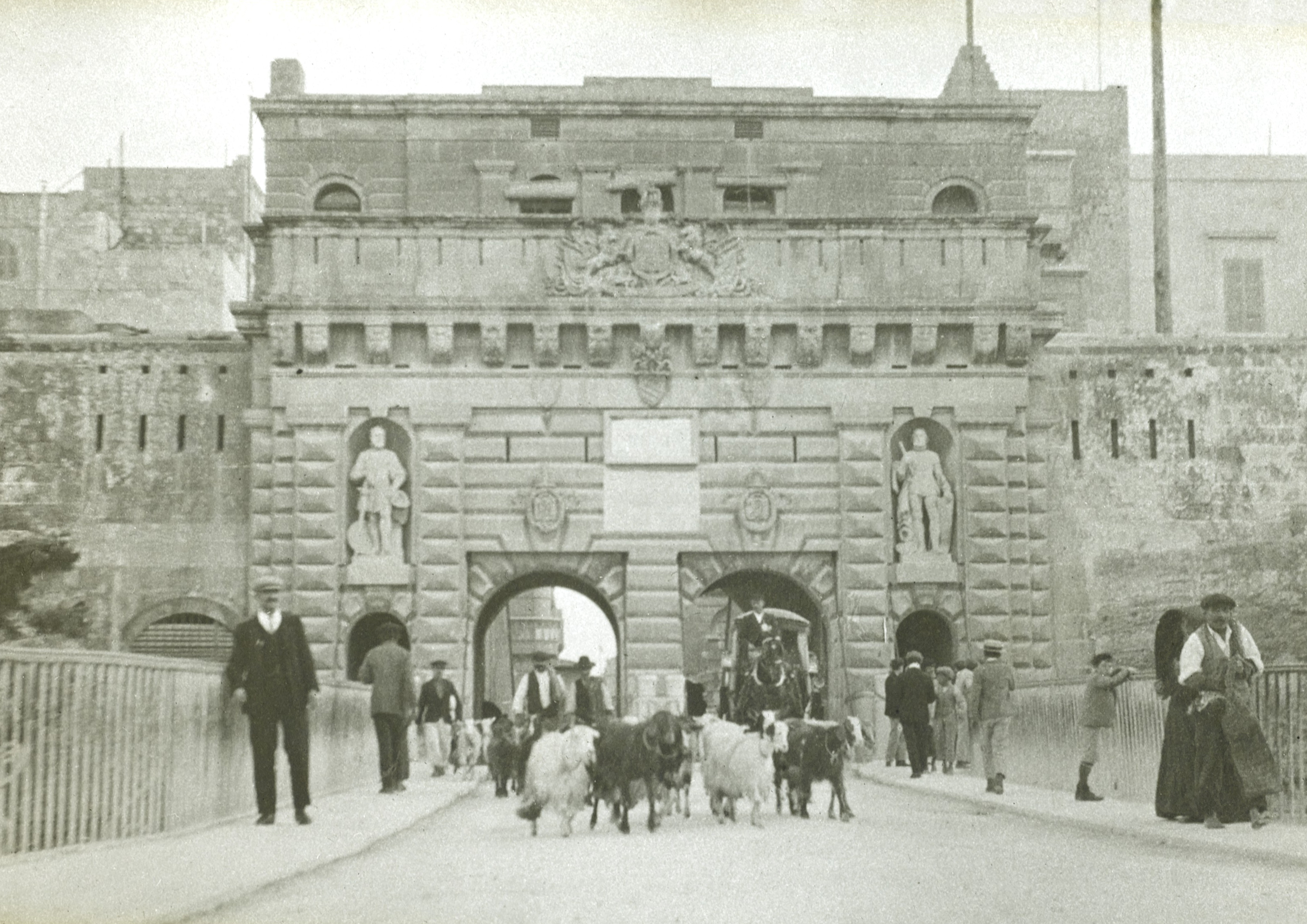
Kingsgate in the early 1900s

The third city gate was built in 1853, during the height of British rule of Malta. The gate was known as Porta Reale, and was also known as Putirjal in Maltese and Kingsgate or Kingsway in English.

The gate was designed by Col. Thompson of the Royal Engineers, and it consisted of two central arches with two smaller ones. There were two statues on either side of the gate: one of Philippe Villiers de L'Isle-Adam, the first Grand Master in Malta, and one of Jean Parisot de Valette, the founder of the city. On 24 July 1892, a bronze bust of Pope Pius V, who had made significant financial contributions to the building of Valletta, was installed above the archway on the rear of the gate.

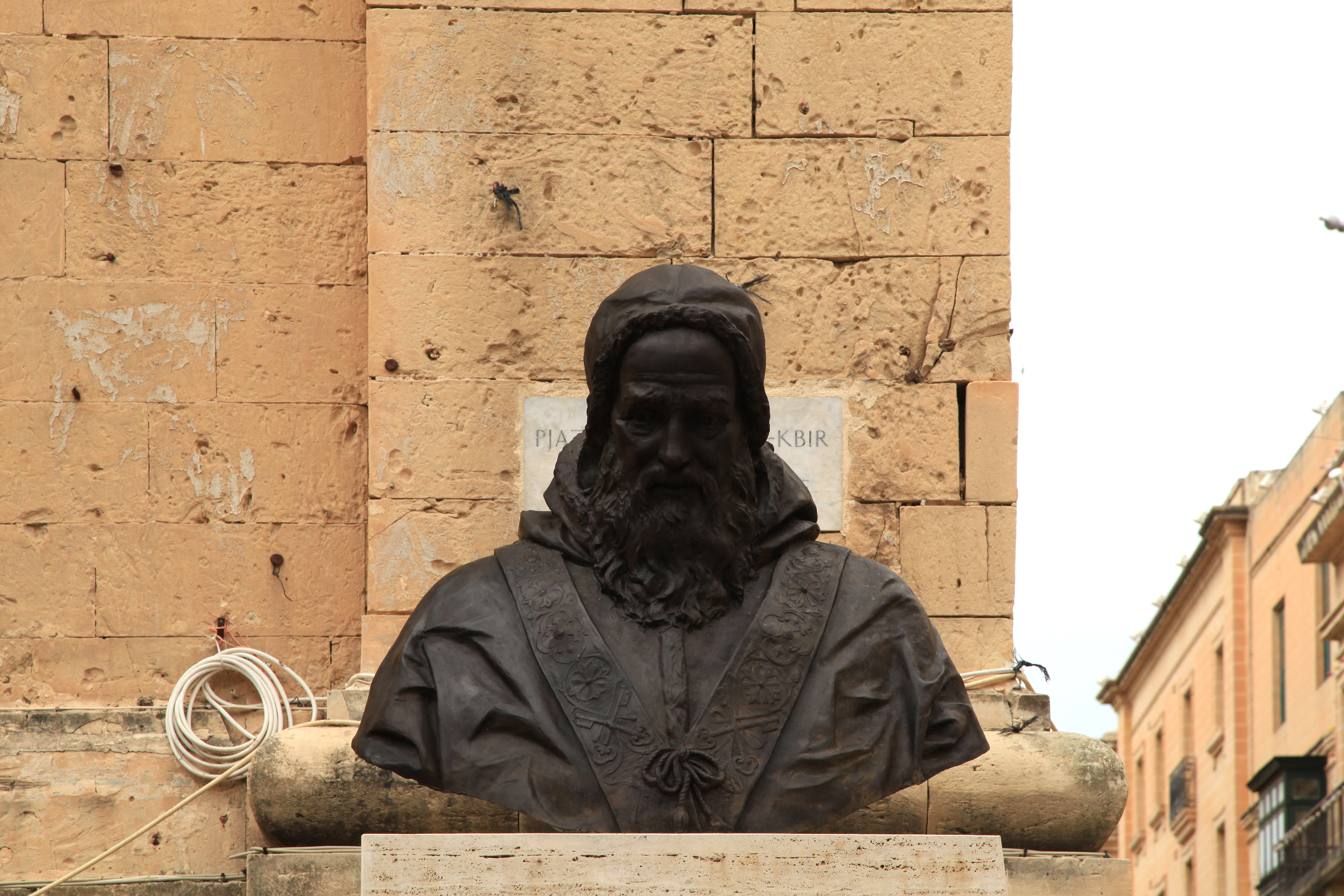
Bust of Pope Pius V which was installed at Porta Reale in 1892, now placed in Great Siege Square

By the early 20th century, the gate was regarded as too small to cope with the large influx of people entering the city. The first proposals to address this issue were made in the 1920s, and some included replacing the gate with an open carriageway. Kingsgate survived the bombings of World War II, although it was slightly damaged in April 1942, when the bridge leading to the gate was hit by aerial bombardment. The statues of L'Isle-Adam and de Valette were destroyed during this attack.

The first plans to redevelop the Royal Opera House and the entrance of Valletta were made in the 1950s. This project was revived by Prime Minister George Borg Olivier in 1962, focusing on the city gate. The project to replace the gate with a larger one was announced at the 1963 Trade Fair Exposition, and the gate was pulled down in June 1964.

Following the demolition of the gate, the bust of Pius V was placed into storage, before being retrieved by the Valletta Local Council in 1993. In 2005, the bust was moved to Great Siege Square, close to St John's Co-Cathedral and the Law Courts.

=== Fourth gate (1965–2011) ===
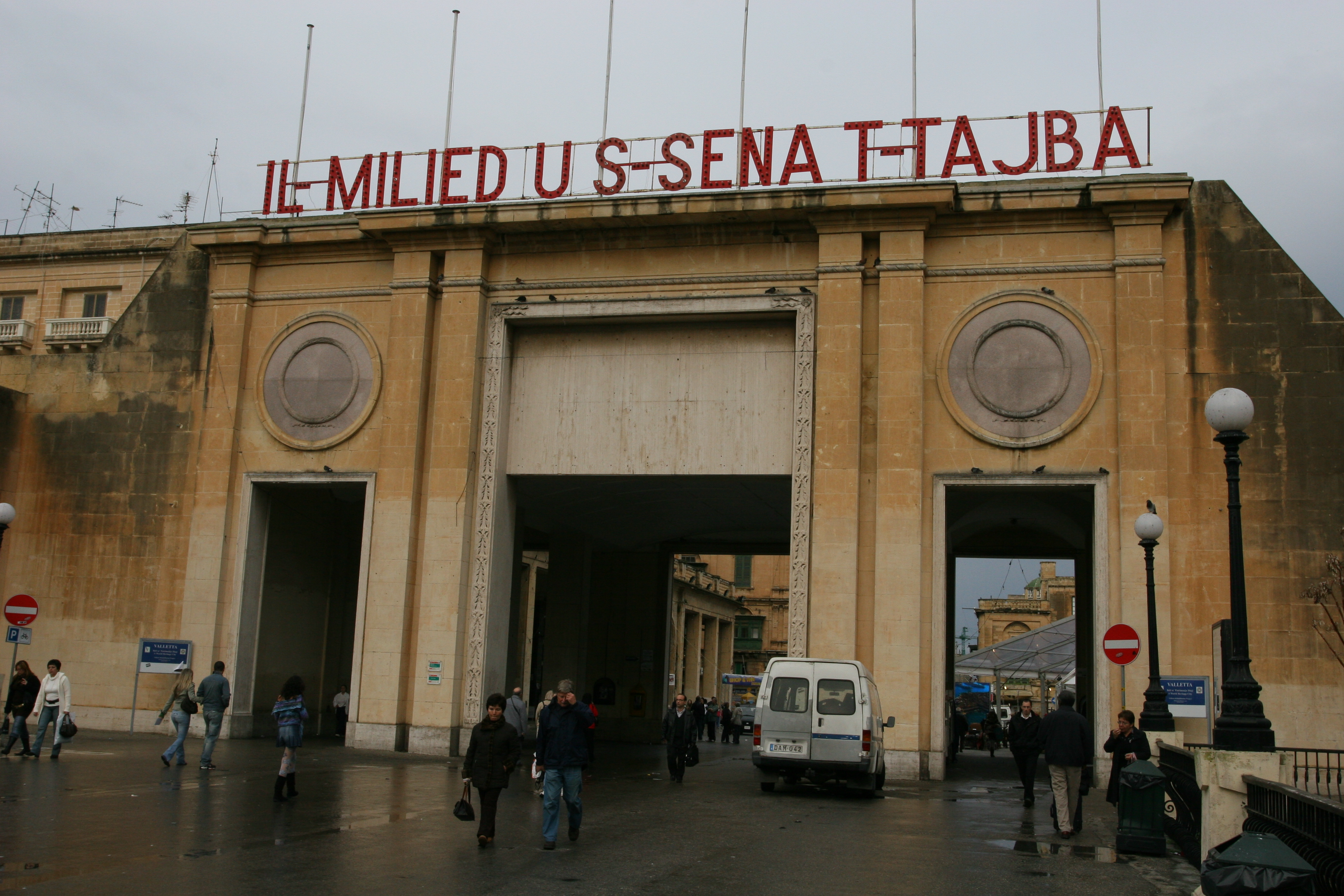
Fourth gate pictured in 2006

The fourth city gate was built between June 1964 and August 1965 to designs of the architect Alziro Bergonzo, in the Italian rationalist style. The gate consisted of a large opening in the centre with two smaller ones on the sides, and it had a simple design with limited ornamentation. Pope Pius V Street (Maltese: Triq il-Papa Piju V) passed on top of the gate.

The gate was part of a project that was never fully completed, that of redeveloping the entrance to Valletta and the Royal Opera House. It was controversial at the time of its construction, with the general public having mixed opinions on the gate. In March 1965, when construction of the gate was underway, the Chamber of Architects criticized its design as an "architectural flop". Arguments in favour of the gate said that it offered a better view of the bastions, and its design reflected the fortifications' austerity.

Further criticism was directed towards the gate in subsequent decades, and there was public interest to replace the gate. The Italian architect Renzo Piano first made plans to redevelop the entrance of Valletta in 1988, but the project was shelved by 1992. In 2008, the government resumed contact with Piano to replace the gate. Piano's new plans were revealed on 27 June 2009, and City Gate was demolished between 2 and 5 May 2011, with Prime Minister Lawrence Gonzi attending the demolition. The demolition of City Gate and the nearby Freedom Square arcades cost a total of €1.39 million.

=== Fifth gate (2014–present) ===
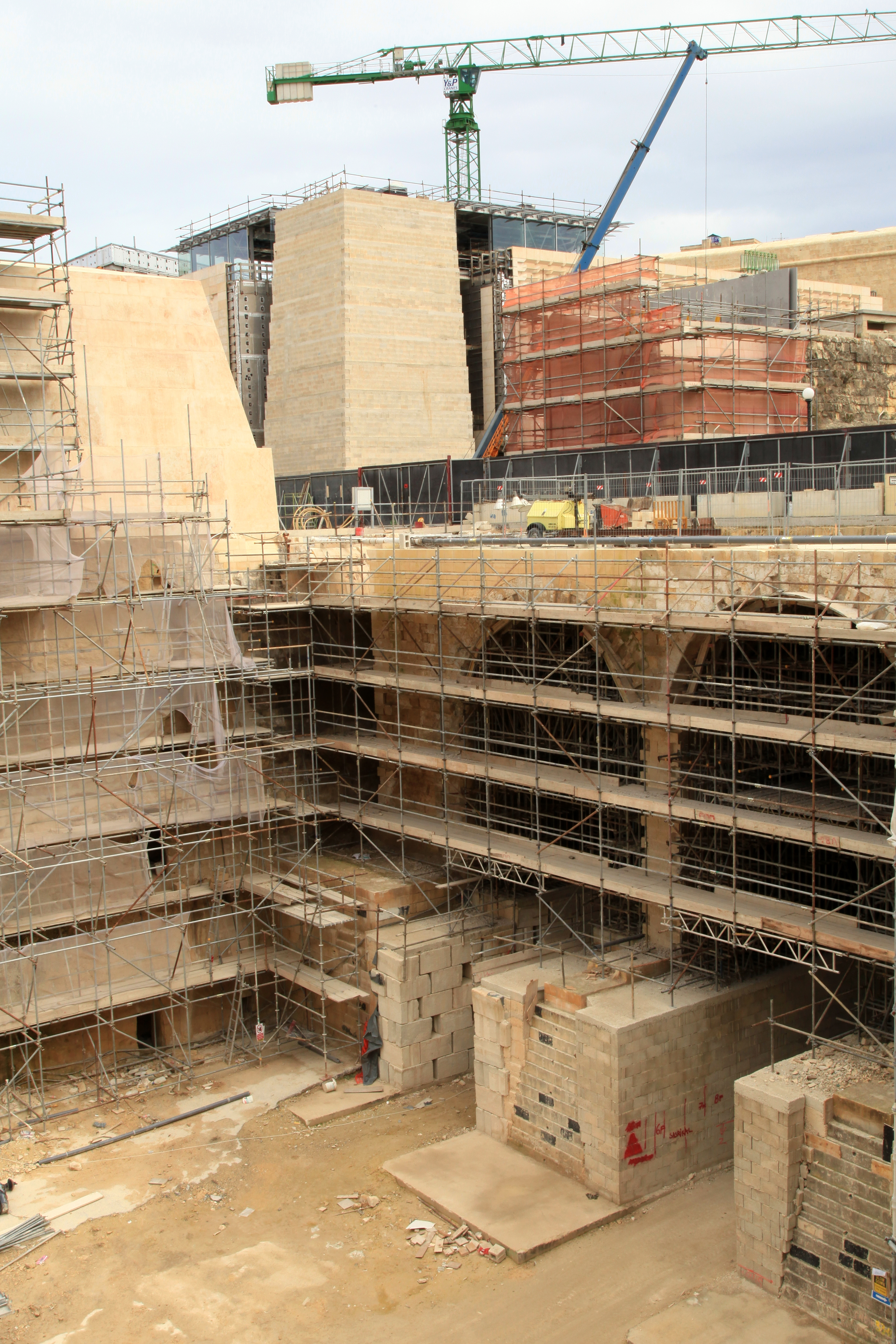
Fifth city gate under construction in 2013

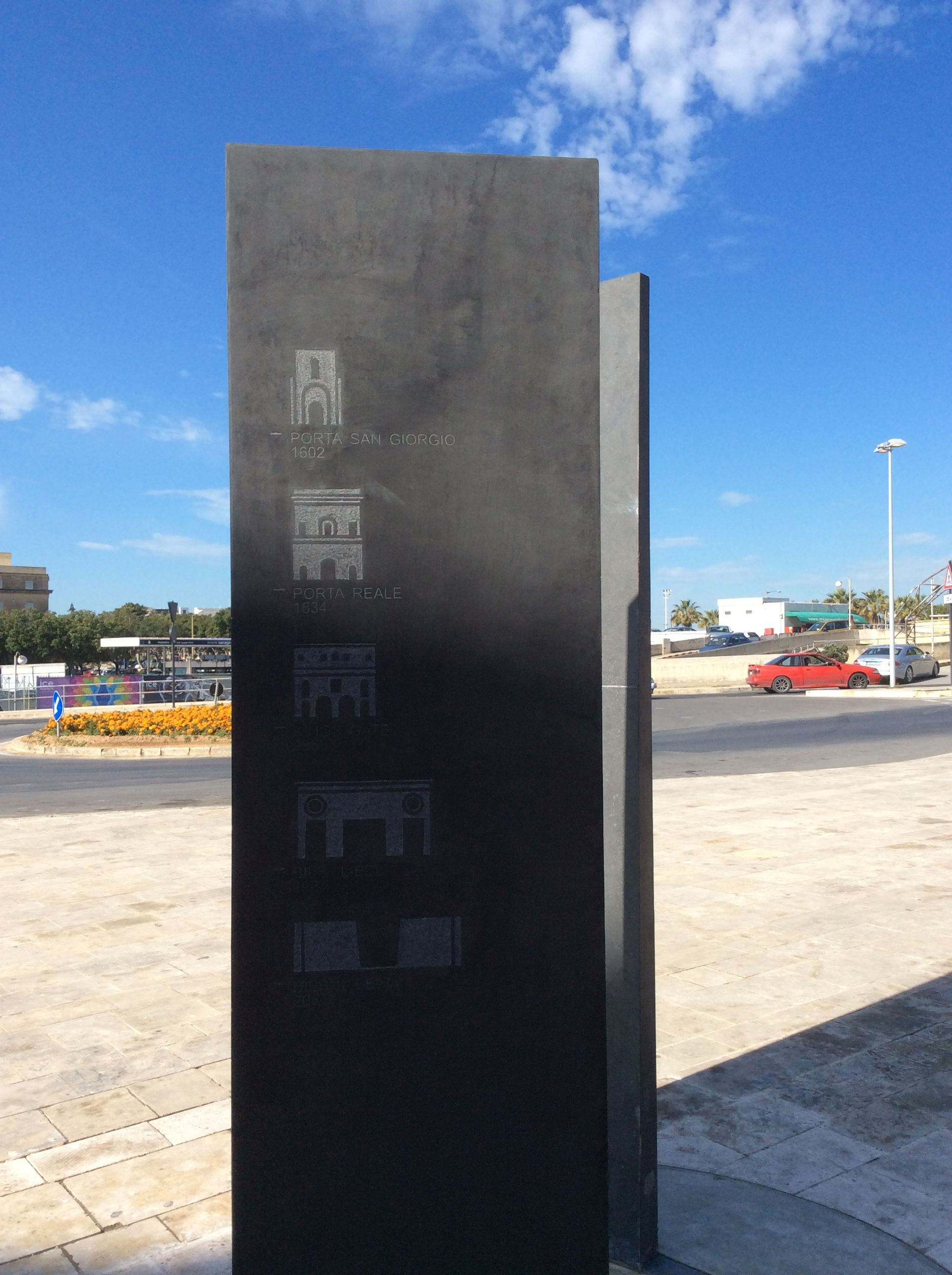
Part of the Prospettiva art installation showing Valletta's five city gates

The fifth and present city gate was constructed between 2011 and 2014 to designs of Renzo Piano. This gate is very different from the previous ones, as it consists of a breach in the bastions, flanked by large blocks of stone which are separated from the curtain walls by high blades of steel. Like the fourth gate, it was also built as part of a project to redesign the city entrance. The project also turned the ruins of the Royal Opera House into an open-air theatre known as Pjazza Teatru Rjal, and a new Parliament House was built occupying part of Freedom Square.

The new city gate, like the rest of Piano's project, was controversial. The majority of the Maltese welcomed the demolition of the fourth gate, although it was one of the few examples of Italian rationalist architecture on the island. Some critics of the new gate preferred a more traditional design similar to the third gate. The new gate has been compared to the ancient Egyptian Temple of Edfu, with critics saying that the breach in the bastions is out of place in the largely Mannerist and Baroque city.

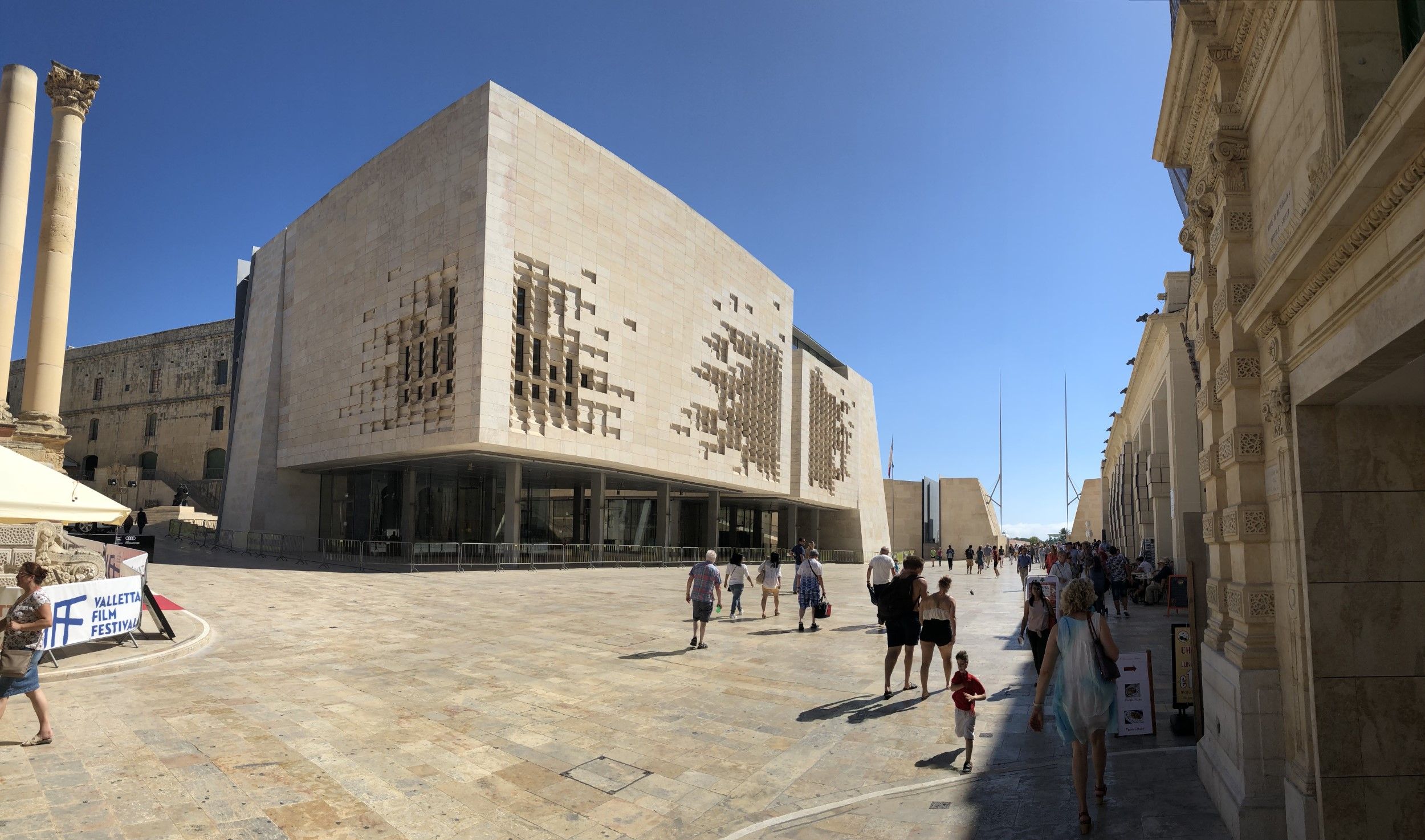
Parliament building in 2018

The Renzo Piano design incorporated many themes from the project evolving over many years, and in the case of the stone facade, this had to be quarried from the ideal location on the island to provide enough stone to frame the gate but delicate enough for the richly textured walls of the Parliament building. The Maltese Hardstone Limestone was carved, to play with the light. There is some 12,000 cubic meters of the Limestone, the aiding of sourcing and production QC was by Kevin Ramsey (Ramsey Stone Consultants).

== Commemorations ==
In October 2014, an art installation entitled Prospettiva was inaugurated in Girolamo Cassar Avenue, close to the bus terminus. The installation incorporates elements from the five gates which have stood at the entrance of Valletta, and it was designed by the architect Chris Briffa. The installation commemorates Valletta's selection as European Capital of Culture in 2018.
