= Ospizio, Floriana =

Ospizio
- L-Ospizju
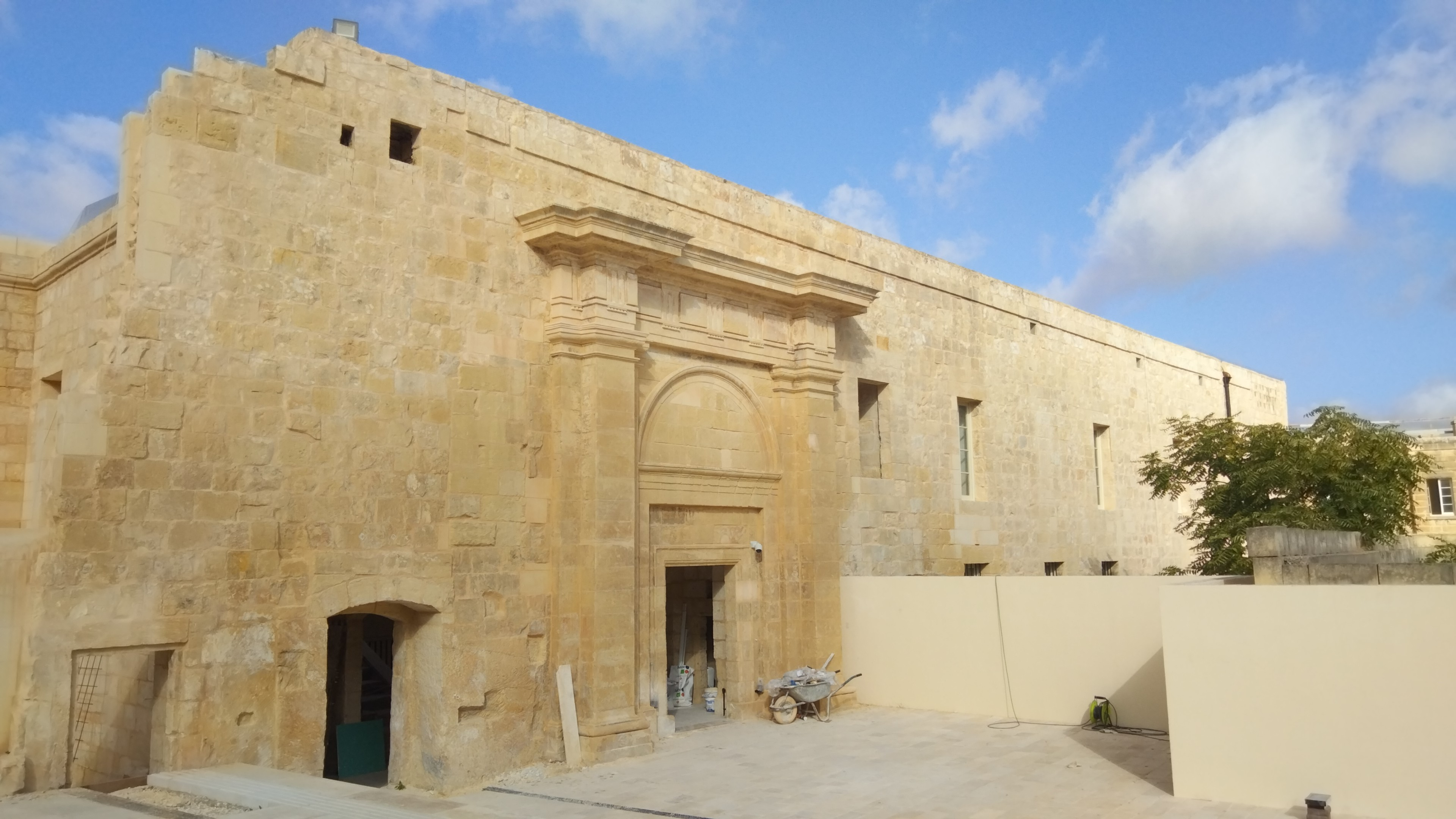
- Former names: Casa di Carità

General information
- Status: Partially intact
- Type: Poorhouse
- Location: Floriana, Malta
- Coordinates: 35°53′42.5″N 14°30′8.5″E
- Current tenants: MICAS
- Year(s) built: c. 1665–1667 (gunpowder factory); 1730s (hospice)

Technical details
- Material: Limestone

Design and construction
- Architect(s): Mederico Blondel; Charles François de Mondion

The Ospizio (Maltese: L-Ospizju), originally known as the Casa di Carità, was a poorhouse in Floriana, Malta which cared for destitute elderly men and women, poor young women, and mentally ill patients during the 18th and 19th centuries. It also served as a women's prison. It was housed in a complex of buildings along the Floriana Lines overlooking Marsamxett Harbour, which are currently being restored and incorporated into the Malta International Contemporary Art Space (MICAS).

== History ==
In 1665, the Congregation of War of the Order of St John began making plans to construct a gunpowder factory along the Floriana Lines overlooking Marsamxett Harbour. The factory was designed by military engineer Mederico Blondel and it was completed by 1667, with several casemates being added in the vicinity in later decades. The factory continued to produce gunpowder until the early 1720s.

In 1729, the former factory was repurposed as a hospice where elderly patients were cared for. On 6 December 1732, Grand Master António Manoel de Vilhena established a Casa di Carità which was constructed to designs of Charles François de Mondion adjacent to the factory; the former factory was subsequently closed as it was not deemed suitable for housing patients. The Casa di Carità was administered by a ten-member commission which included four elderly Hospitaller knights, a priest, a vicar, two jurats and two prominent Maltese. It housed approximately 380 people each year, including destitute elderly, poor women, and people with mental illnesses. It was segregated with elderly men being housed in an upper floor and with the lower level being reserved for women. The latter was subdivided into separate sections: a Ginecco for elderly women, a Conservatorio de' Vergini for young women, and a Reclusorio for female prisoners. Mentally ill patients were chained to walls in casements.

The young women at the Conservatorio de' Vergini worked by producing thread from cotton, the proceeds of which were divided between the women and the institution. The income this generated allowed for the Casa di Carità to be financially independent, although at times this was insufficient and its income was later supplemented by a tax on notarial acts and by annual contributions of 1500 scudi by the Università of Valletta. Each year, four of the women were given a dowry of 40 scudi which enabled them to marry. The Casa di Carità was reformed by Grand Master Emmanuel de Rohan-Polduc with a set of new regulations in 1785, and at this point its name was changed to the Ospizio. By the end of the 18th century, it had a capital of 12,606 scudi.

The Ospizio as depicted on an 1831 map, labelled as an "Asylum for Lunatics"

The Ospizio continued to operate during the French occupation and the early years of British rule. Reformed prostitutes and mentally-ill female patients were transferred from the Casetta in Valletta to the Ospizio during the French occupation, while from 1804 to 1832 and 1848 to 1894 the site also housed an orphanage for illegitimate children. On 15 January 1815, Governor Thomas Maitland issued a Charitable Institutions Reform which transformed the Ospizio into a poorhouse and by the following year, its Hospitaller-era administrative structure was abolished and the tax on notarial acts which had provided funding had been repealed. Meanwhile, mentally-ill male patients from the Civil Hospital in Valletta were also transferred to the Ospizio in 1816. In around the 1820s, nearby buildings were taken over and incorporated into the complex. Between September 1835 and 1838, all mentally ill patients in the Ospizio were moved to Villa Franconi, a large residential building in Floriana which was repurposed as an asylum. In June 1837, a cholera epidemic began at the Ospizio and subsequently spread throughout the Maltese Islands.

In 1892, the elderly were transferred from the Ospizio to the newly established St Vincent de Paul residence in Luqa. The women's prison was housed at the Ospizio until 1895. Its buildings were subsequently transferred to the Army Ordnance Department of the British Army, and during World War I it was used as a workshop where hospital furniture and medical devices were manufactured. During World War II, gun emplacements were installed on the fortifications around the area, which were then targeted during enemy air raids. The Ospizio complex suffered significant damage due to aerial bombardment during the war.

After Malta became independent in 1964, the British forces handed over the complex to the Government of Malta, and it housed an Enemalta store and a trade school by the early 1970s. Parts of the site were being used as an Immigration Office and a Security Branch in 1975. The Restoration Directorate established its offices in the nearby Polverista Curtain in 1997.

The Malta International Contemporary Art Space (MICAS) established its offices within the Ospizio complex in 2017, and a project involving the restoration of the site and the construction of a new MICAS building on the nearby San Salvatore Bastion was announced the following year. The project was intended to be completed by 2021, but the scheduled opening date has since been moved to late 2024.

== Architecture ==
The gunpowder factory built in 1665 consisted of a cruciform building within a rectangular walled enclosure.

The Casa di Carità as built in the 1730s had an irregular plan which featured a courtyard with an arcade and a fountain. The complex included a chapel dedicated to the Virgin Mary and a sacristy. During the British period, the complex included a Protestant chapel.

Parts of the complex which survived World War II include some stores and vaults, the chapel, and the boundary walls.
