= Mount Carmel Psychiatric Hospital =

Psychiatric hospital in Malta

Mount Carmel Hospital
- Sptar Monte Karmeli
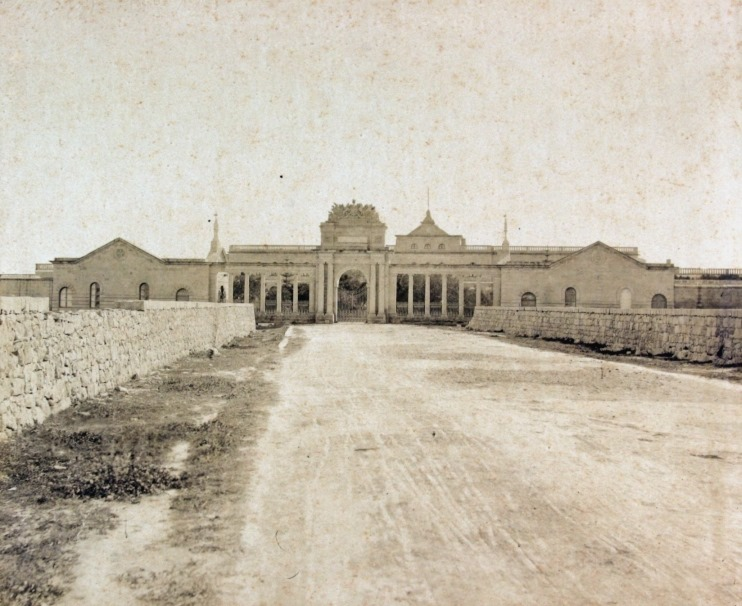
- Main gate of the hospital in 1905
- Interactive map of the Mount Carmel Hospital area
- Former names: Asylum for the Insane (1861–1928); Hospital for Mental Diseases (1928–1967)

General information
- Status: In use
- Type: Psychiatric hospital
- Architectural style: Neoclassical
- Location: Attard, Malta
- Coordinates: 35°53′04″N 14°25′56″E
- Named for: Our Lady of Mount Carmel
- Construction started: September 1853
- Opened: 16 July 1861

Technical details
- Material: Limestone

Design and construction
- Architect: Francesco Cianciolo

Our Lady of Mount Carmel Hospital, commonly shortened to Mount Carmel Hospital (Maltese: Sptar Monte Karmeli), is a mental health hospital located in Attard, Malta offering both in and out-patient service. The inpatient care includes acute care, rehabilitation and long stay, old age and medical care, children and adolescents, learning disability and forensic/prison ward. At Mount Carmel Hospital patients with mental health problems are assisted and supported for their social network. The hospital has many wards, and security measures are in place with patients needing special permission to be allowed out of a ward into the yard outside. Admissions wards, Ward 1 and Ward 7 consist of shared dormitories and kitchen and smoking areas. In The Multi Purpose Ward, the Seclusion ward and the Maximum Security Ward a person is given non-tearable clothes and detained in solitary confinement for up to 17 hours each day. The bare small rooms contain a mattress on the floor and a squat toilet.

The hospital was constructed between 1853 and 1861 as the Asylum for the Insane, replacing a former asylum at Villa Franconi. It was renamed to Hospital for Mental Diseases in 1928 and to its present name in 1967. Plans to close down the hospital are ongoing as of 2024.

== History ==
Prior to the opening of Mount Carmel Hospital, Malta's mentally-ill patients had been housed in a lunatic asylum at Villa Franconi in Floriana which had opened in 1835. This asylum became overcrowded by the mid-19th century, and by 1851 the Commissioners of Charitable Institutions and the Visiting Physician were recommending its relocation. In September 1852, the government announced a design competition for a new Ospizio and Lunatic Asylum through the Malta Government Gazette.

A proposal by Italian refugee Francesco Cianciolo was selected over other entries which had been submitted by G. Bonavia, V. Mallia & A. Caruana, G. Grognet and G. Diacono. The project's estimated cost of £40,000 was deemed to be excessive, so a revised proposal which included the Lunatic Asylum but not the Ospizio was prepared, reducing the estimated cost to £14,000. (Note: Comparing mid-19th-century costs and prices with those of the modern period is challenging. Depending on the price comparison used, £40,000 in 1852 could be equivalent to between £5.49 million and £184.2 million in 2023, while £14,000 in 1852 could be equivalent to between £1.92 million and £64.48 million in 2023.) A site located within the limits of Attard was chosen, and construction began in September 1853. After works had commenced, it came to light that Cianciolo's designs did not include basic necessities and had been plagiarised from 1818 plans of the Wakefield Asylum in England. This revelation cast doubt on Cianciolo's professional qualifications, and further changes to the design had to be made during the course of construction. English architect William Scamp was involved in the construction project as a consultant.

The building – officially known as the Asylum for the Insane (also referred to as the Asylum for Imbeciles or the Lunatic Asylum in some sources) – was completed in 1861, and all 253 patients in Villa Franconi were moved to it on 16 July 1861. From the outset, the site proved to be inadequate as it had only been designed to house 180 to 200 patients. Proposals to enlarge the asylum were made but were initially not implemented, and in 1864 efforts were made to restrict admissions. Despite this, the number of patients increased to 337 by 1867 and to 404 in 1884.

In August 1887 cholera broke out in the asylum during an island-wide epidemic, prompting the government to commence efforts to enlarge the building in 1889. An Agricultural Colony was added in 1892, and plans and photographs of the enlarged asylum were exhibited at the World's Columbian Exposition in Chicago in 1893, during which the institution was awarded a medal and a certificate of merit. Works continued with the addition of an Infirmary to the Female Division in 1894 and an Observation Ward and an Infirmary to the Male Division in 1899. In the meantime, the population continued to increase, reaching 653 by 1898.

A block for male criminal patients was completed in 1909. The institution was renamed to Hospital for Mental Diseases on 2 March 1928, while the Toledo Ward in the Female Division was added in 1932. The hospital was renamed to Our Lady of Mount Carmel Hospital on 16 July 1967, and it continued to operate throughout the 20th and 21st centuries as the only mental health hospital in Malta.

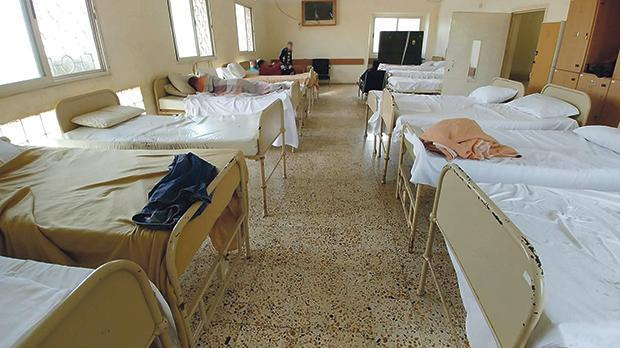
Interior of one of the hospital's wards

The conditions inside the hospital were widely criticised in the 2010s and 2020s. The Committee for the Prevention of Torture criticised its atmosphere and material conditions in 2016, and in the same year some wards were closed after being declared unsafe. A 2018 audit revealed that the hospital lacked adequate funding, staffing and security, and by 2019 the ceilings of many of the wards had been condemned and patients' beds were being moved to corridors. In 2018 it was reported that €30 million had been allocated to repair and refurbish Mount Carmel Hospital, while plans were being made to construct a new mental health hospital adjacent to Mater Dei Hospital. In September 2022, the Foundation for Medical Services submitted a planning application to demolish one of the condemned wards at Mount Carmel and replace it with a modern ward while retaining the 19th-century façade.

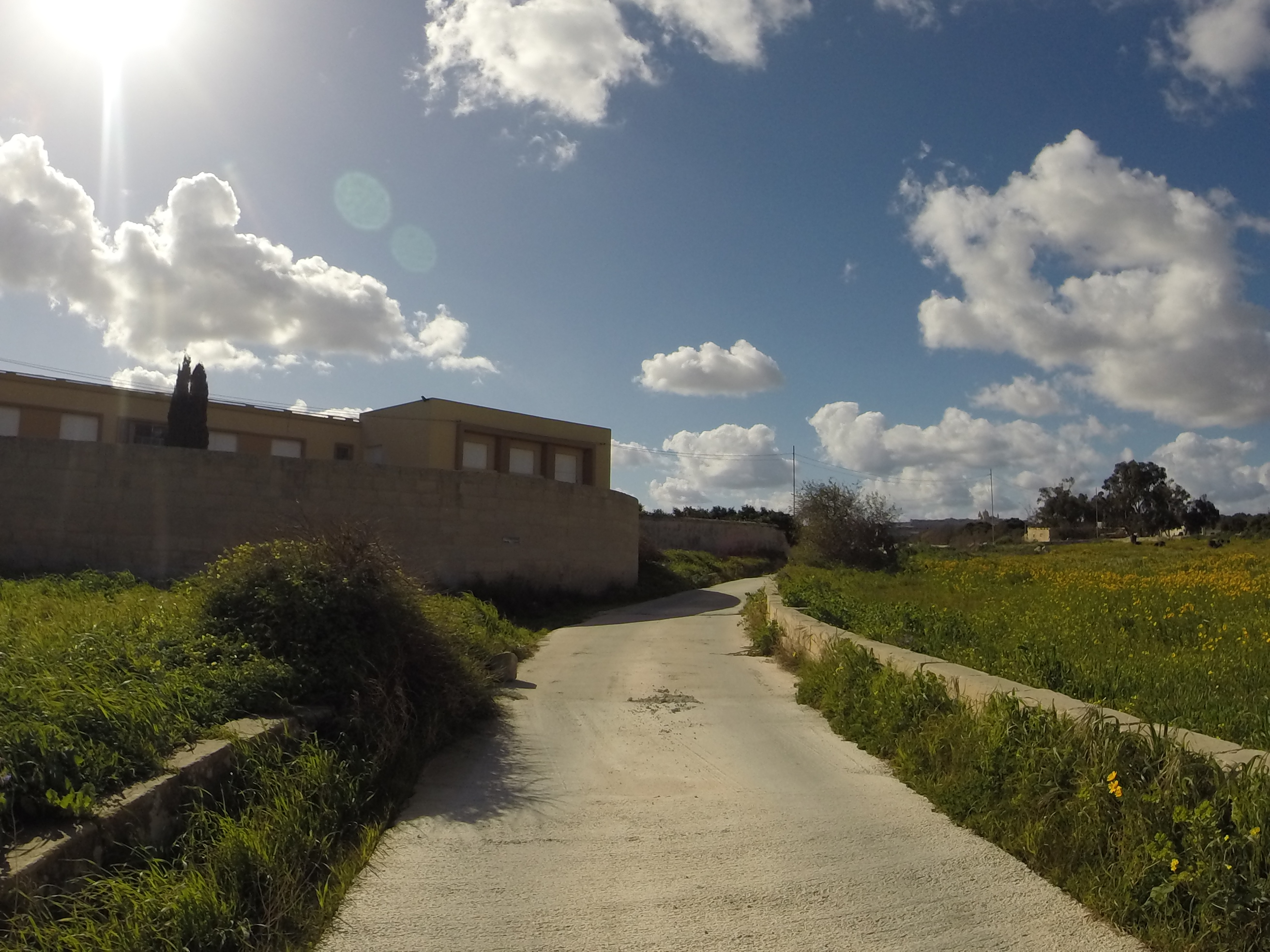
Exterior of the hospital in 2015

In May 2024, health minister Jo Etienne Abela stated that Mount Carmel Hospital is no longer suited for its purpose, and that there are plans to close it down after moving psychiatric health services to a unit within Mater Dei Hospital. There are also plans to move patients from Mount Carmel to several other government-run and private-sector facilities.

== Architecture ==
The hospital is built in a neoclassical style. It was originally designed as a single-storey building with a pavilion-corridor layout, with wards radiating from two central circular halls.

The hospital's main gate features sculpted coats of arms of the William Reid and John Gaspard Le Marchant, the British Governors of Malta during whose tenure the building was constructed.

== See also ==
- Villa Chelsea in Birkirkara
