= Auberge d'Aragon =

- Berġa ta' Aragona
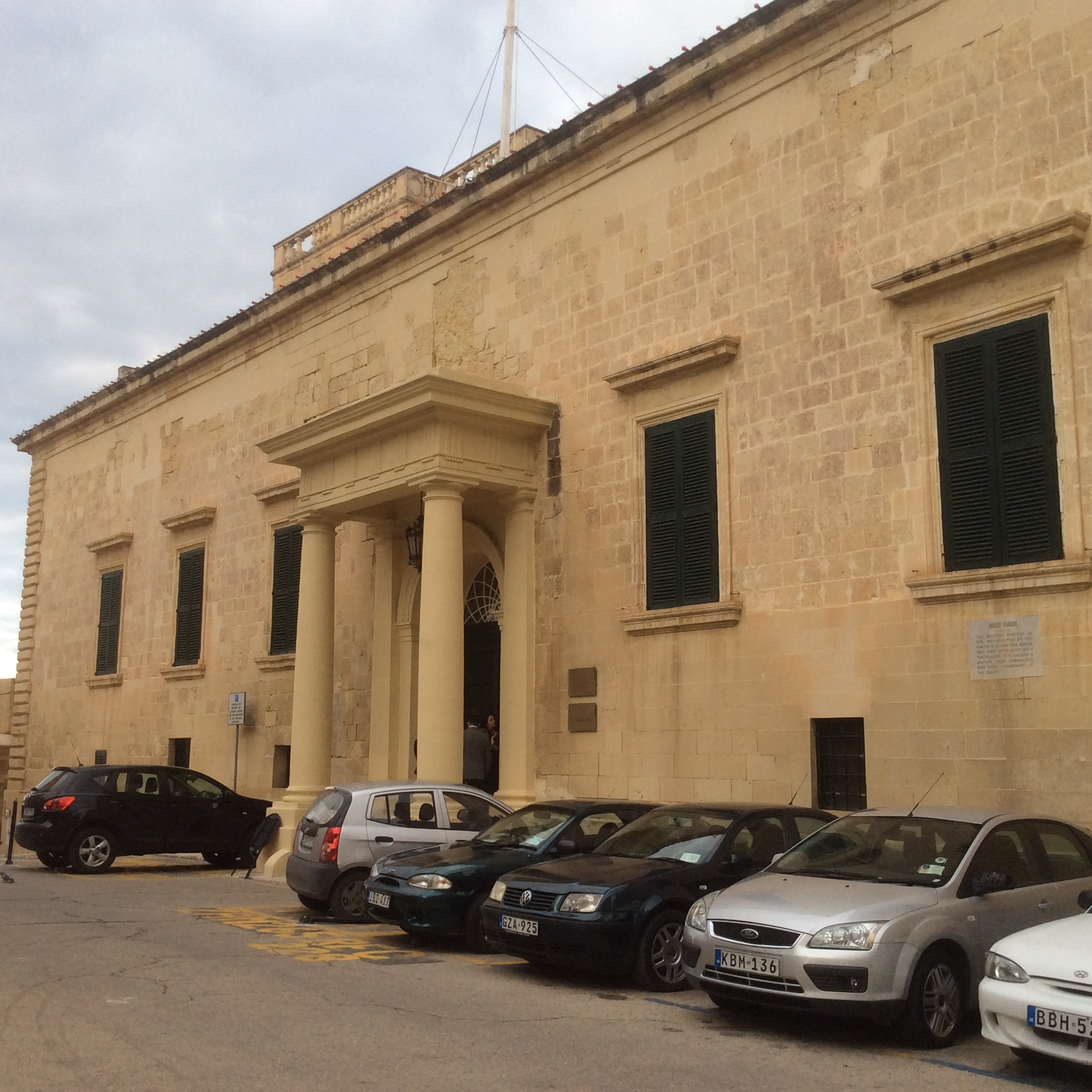
- Façade of Auberge d'Aragon
- Interactive map of the Auberge d'Aragon area
- Former names: Gibraltar House

General information
- Status: Intact
- Type: Auberge
- Architectural style: Mannerist (with neoclassical portico)
- Location: Valletta, Malta
- Coordinates: 35°54′04″N 14°30′45″E
- Current tenants: Ministry for European Affairs and Equality
- Construction started: 1571
- Renovated: c. 1840s (portico added)
- Owner: Government of Malta

Technical details
- Material: Limestone
- Floor count: 1

Design and construction
- Architect: Girolamo Cassar

The Auberge d'Aragon (Maltese: Berġa ta' Aragona) is an auberge in Valletta, Malta. It was built in 1571 to house knights of the Order of Saint John from the langue of Aragon, Navarre and Catalonia. It is the only surviving auberge in Valletta which retains its original Mannerist design by the architect Girolamo Cassar. (Note: Of the seven original auberges in Valletta, Auberge d'Allemagne was demolished and Auberge d'Auvergne and Auberge de France were destroyed in World War II. Auberge d'Italie and Auberge de Provence were extensively remodeled in the 17th century, and Auberge de Castille was completely rebuilt in the 18th century, leaving Auberge d'Aragon as the only surviving auberge which never saw a major renovation.)

In the early 19th century, the building was requisitioned by the British military, and in 1842 it was leased to Bishop George Tomlinson, being renamed Gibraltar House. At this point, a neoclassical portico was added to the façade, by then the major addition to the exterior since the 16th century. In the 19th and early 20th centuries, the auberge was also used as a printing press and a school. It was converted into a hospital during World War II.

It housed the Office of the Prime Minister in 1921–33 and 1947–72. It has since housed various government ministries. Since 2020 it houses the Ministry for Justice.

== History ==
=== Hospitaller rule ===
Auberge d'Aragon was designed by the Maltese architect Girolamo Cassar in 1566, making it the oldest auberge in the city of Valletta. The plot of land on which it was built was purchased on 20 September 1569 for the sum of 80 scudi and 8 tari. Construction began in 1571. In 1674, the Langue of Aragon built the Church of Our Lady of Pilar adjacent to the auberge. The 1693 Sicily earthquake caused serious damage to the façade and the southeast face of the auberge, but the damage was later repaired. The church was also damaged, and it was rebuilt in a new design, being completed in 1718.

The Auberge has a large underground which was originally used for horses. A water system was installed at some point, possibly after the construction of the Wignacourt Aqueduct. In the 18th century the underground was converted and used as an oven. This part of the Auberge was later buried, probably sometimes in the British period. Initial studies claim that the oven served as a bakery. The access of the underground was substantially altered after the earthquake and the later erection of nearby buildings. After the rediscovery of the bakery, it was decided to restore it and open it to the public.

=== French and British periods ===
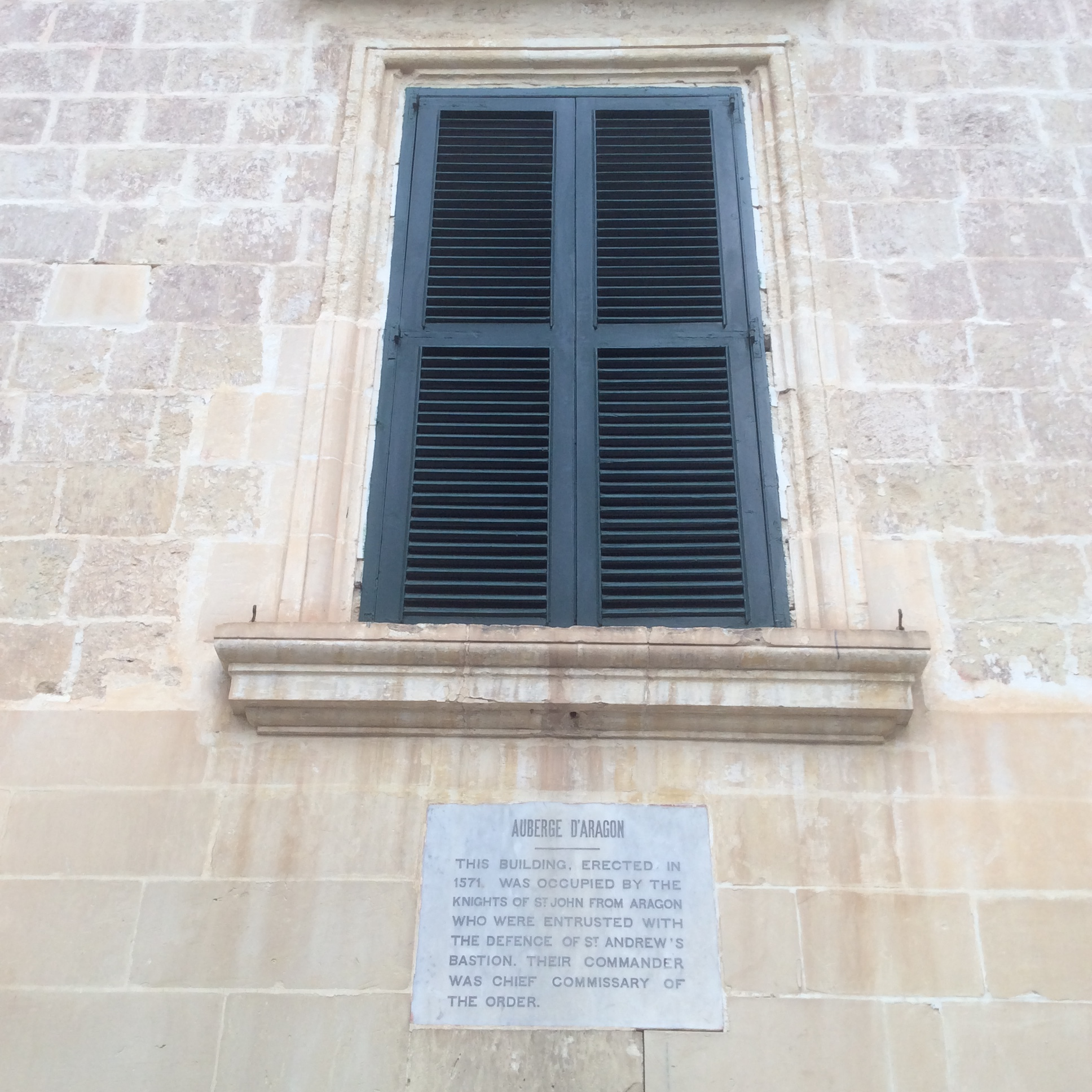
Plaque on the auberge

The Order of St. John was expelled from Malta with the French invasion and occupation in 1798. Two years later, the Maltese Islands became a British protectorate, and the auberge was requisitioned by the Quartermaster. From 1822 to 1824, the building housed the government printing press. In the late 1830s, the building was the residence of the Chief Secretary to Government.

In 1842, the auberge was leased to George Tomlinson, the Anglican Bishop of Gibraltar, and the building was known as Gibraltar House. The only major alteration to the auberge, a Doric portico leading to the main doorway, was probably built at this point.

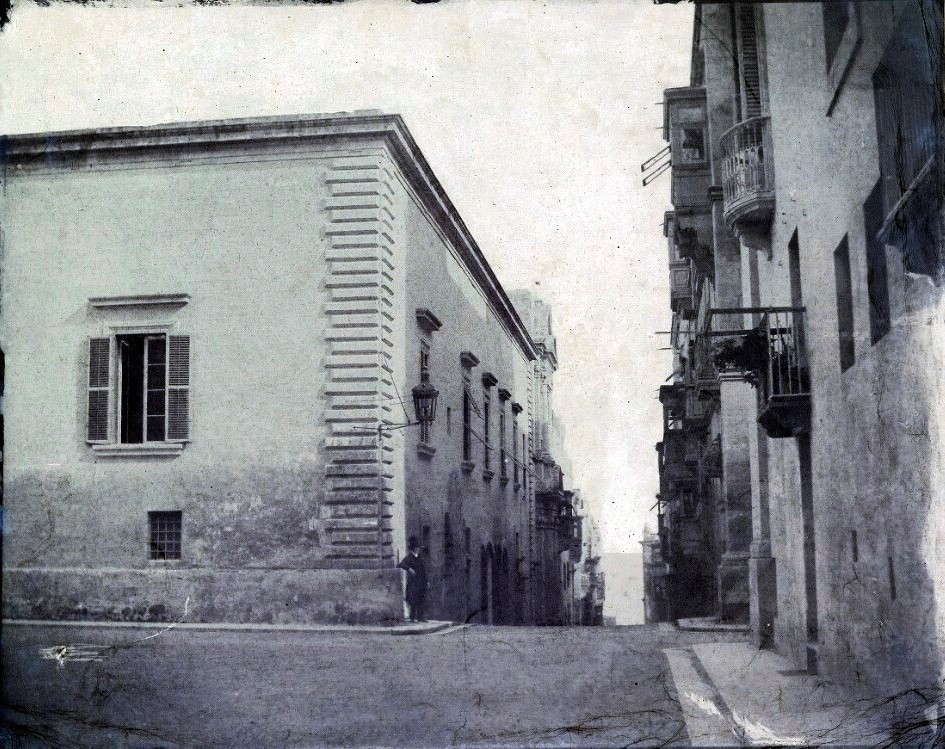
The building in 1846

After Malta was granted self-government in 1921, the auberge was converted into a school. In 1924, upon Ugo Pasquale Mifsud's election as Prime Minister of Malta, the building became the Office of the Prime Minister (OPM). In 1931, there were plans to move the parliament from the Grandmaster's Palace into the auberge, but nothing materialized. The building continued to house the OPM until the office was abolished upon the suspension of the constitution in 1933. From 1933 to 1939 the building was left vacant. In 1939, the auberge was given to the British Institute. It was used as a hospital for British families during WWII known as the Military Families’ Hospital.

A new constitution was granted in 1947, restoring self-government and reestablishing the position of Prime Minister. At this point the British Institute moved to nearby Casa Bolino. The auberge was once again used as the OPM, with Paul Boffa being the first Prime Minister to use it as his office. On 16 January 1951, Prime Minister George Borg Olivier presented a small bronze model of Les Gavroches, created by artist Antonio Sciortino, to Princess Elizabeth (now Queen Elizabeth II) in a ceremony held at the building. The islands became independent as the State of Malta in 1964, and the independence was drafted on a table which still remains in the auberge today.

=== Independent Malta ===
Auberge d'Aragon continued to house the OPM until 1972, when Dom Mintoff moved the Office to Auberge de Castille, where it remains to this day. The building subsequently housed the Ministry of Education and Culture, which was then led by Minister Agatha Barbara, who later became President of Malta. After the 1987 elections, Parliamentary Secretary for Industry John Dalli took up his offices in the auberge, and he also used it later as the Ministry for Economic Affairs. This was later renamed the Ministry of Economic Services, and after 2003 the Ministry of Finance and Economic Services.

In March 2004, the auberge became the Office of the Deputy Prime Minister and the Ministry for Justice and Home Affairs. From 2012, it was used by the Ministry for Home and Parliamentary Affairs, and it later became the Ministry for Home Affairs and the Ministry for EU Affairs. In 2016, the building housed the Office of the Deputy Prime Minister as well as the Parliamentary Secretary for the EU Presidency 2017 and EU Funds. From 2017 to 2020, the auberge housed the Ministry for European Affairs and Equality. Since 2020, the auberge has been the Ministry for Justice.

During restoration works carried out in 2019, an early 18th century bakery oven, some wells and water canals were discovered buried under debris in an underground part of the auberge.

The building was included on the Antiquities List of 1925 together with the other auberges in Valletta. It is now scheduled as a Grade 1 national monument by the Malta Environment and Planning Authority, and it is also listed on the National Inventory of the Cultural Property of the Maltese Islands.

== Architecture ==
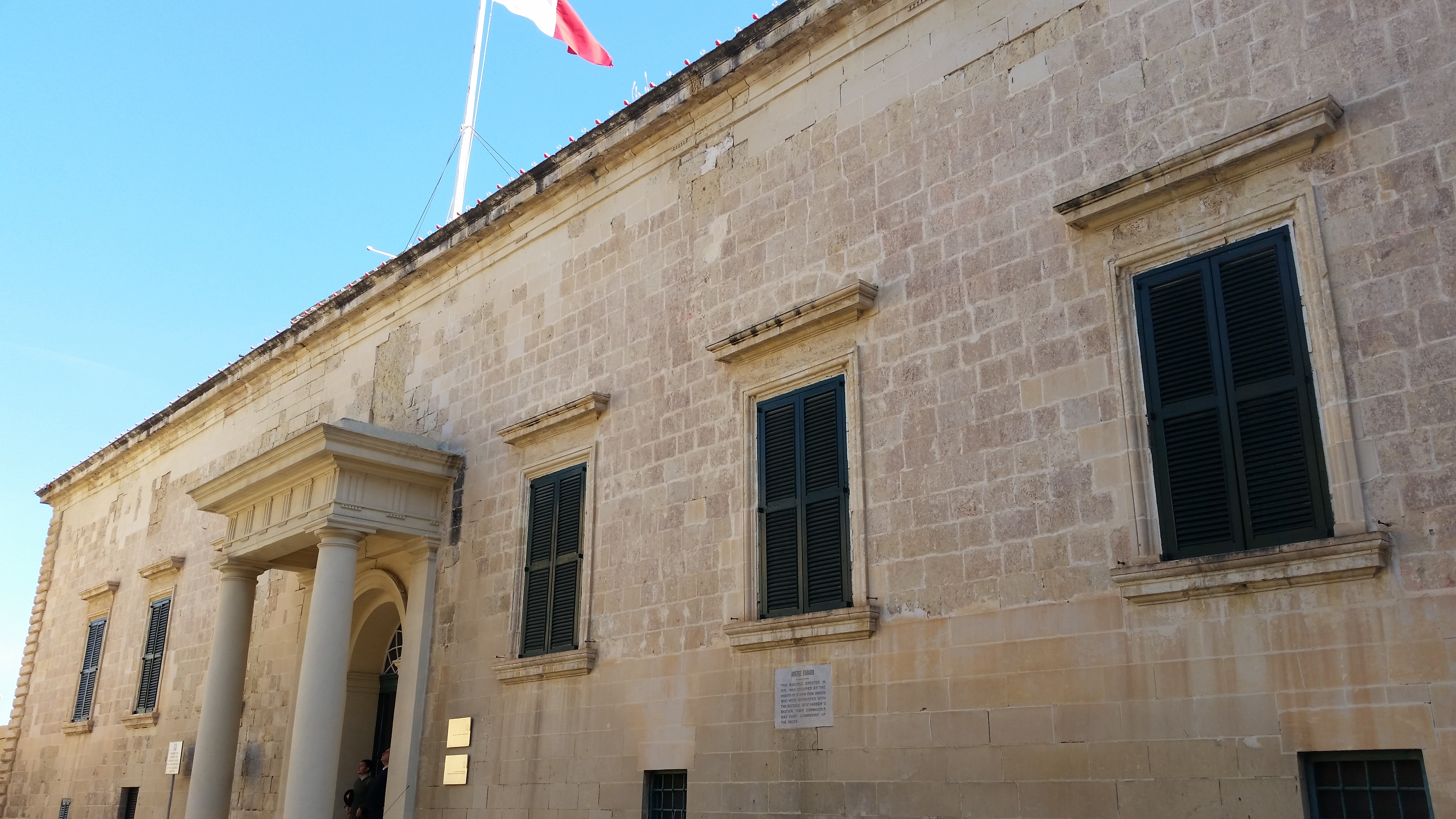
View of the auberge

Auberge d'Aragon is built in the Mannerist style typical of its architect Girolamo Cassar, and it is the only auberge in Valletta which still retains its original design. It is a single-story building with a rectangular plan and a central arcaded courtyard.

The building does not have a symmetric façade, despite the effort of the architect to make it appear so. It contains a main doorway flanked by three moulded windows on either side. It is rather plain, with its decorative emphasis being the continuous cornice along roof level and the rusticated corners. A Doric portico leads to the doorway, and it is the only major alteration to the auberge.

The building was originally painted in red ochre, a colour used by the Order to mark public buildings. Some traces of the paint can still be seen at the rear part of the auberge. The interior of the building contains some Renaissance-era rooms.
