= Auberge d'Auvergne =

- Berġa ta' Alvernja
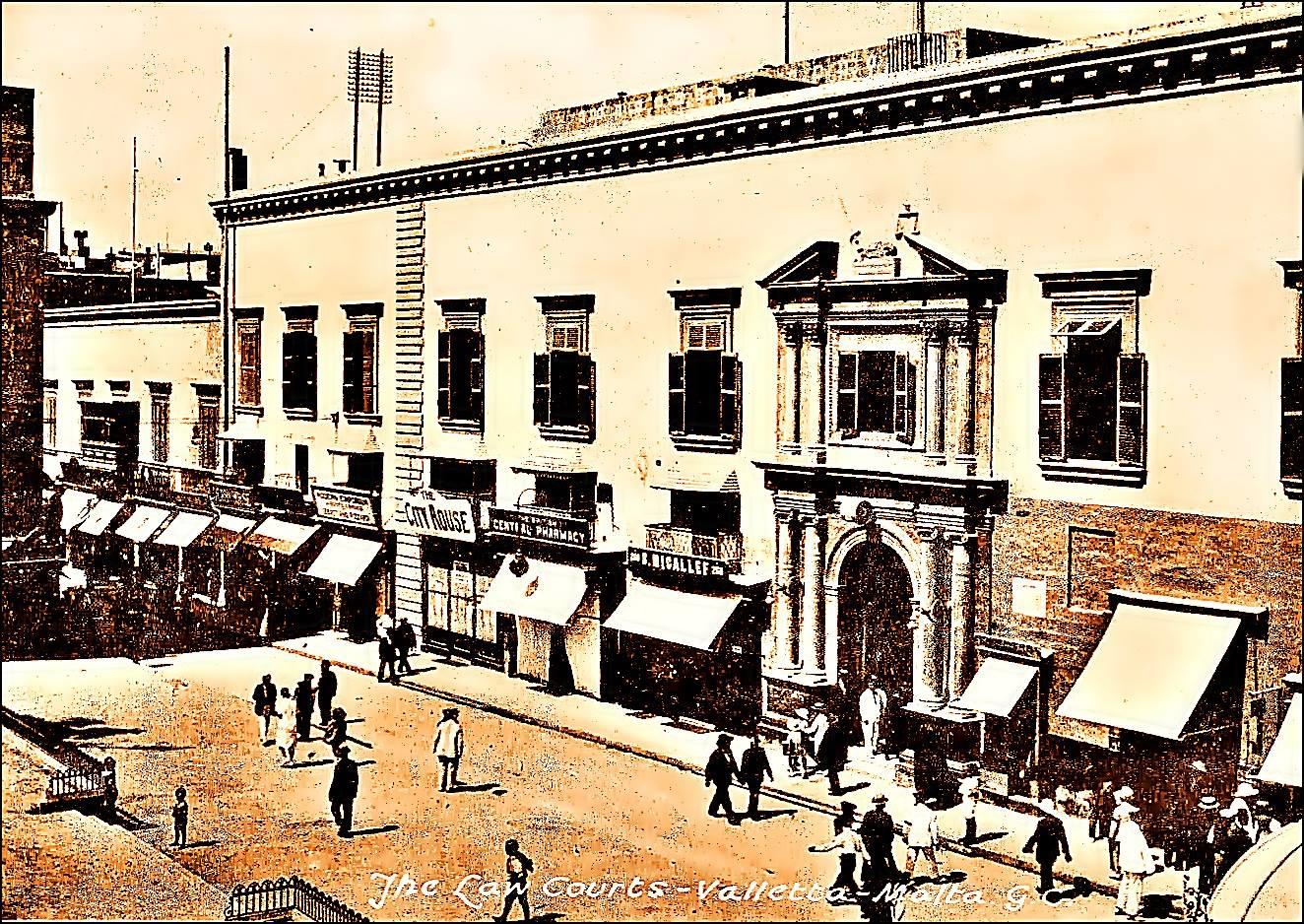
- View of Auberge d'Auvergne and Casa Caccia

General information
- Status: Destroyed
- Type: Auberge
- Architectural style: Mannerist
- Location: Valletta, Malta
- Coordinates: 35°53′53.7″N 14°30′44.2″E
- Construction started: 1571 or 1574
- Completed: c. 1583
- Renovated: 1783 (enlarged); 1853 (alterations)
- Destroyed: 30 April 1941 (bombed); 1950s–60s (ruins demolished)

Technical details
- Material: Limestone
- Floor count: 2

Design and construction
- Architect: Girolamo Cassar

The Auberge d'Auvergne (Maltese: Berġa ta' Alvernja) was an auberge in Valletta, Malta. It was built in the 16th century to house knights of the Order of Saint John from the langue of Auvergne. It became a courthouse in the 19th century, and it remained so until it was destroyed by aerial bombardment in 1941. The site is now occupied by the Courts of Justice building, which was constructed in the 1960s.

== History ==
Auberge d'Auvergne was located in Great Siege Square within Strada San Giorgio (now known as Republic Street), facing the nave of St. John's Co-Cathedral. The langue of Auvergne received the authorization to construct the auberge on 8 June 1570, and construction started either in 1571 or 1574. It was completed in around 1583, and the building was constructed to a design of the Maltese architect Girolamo Cassar. Auberge d'Auvergne was enlarged in 1783, when part of an adjacent 16th-century palace called Casa Caccia was incorporated into the building. The auberge continued to house the langue of Auvergne until 1798, when the Order left Malta due to the French occupation.

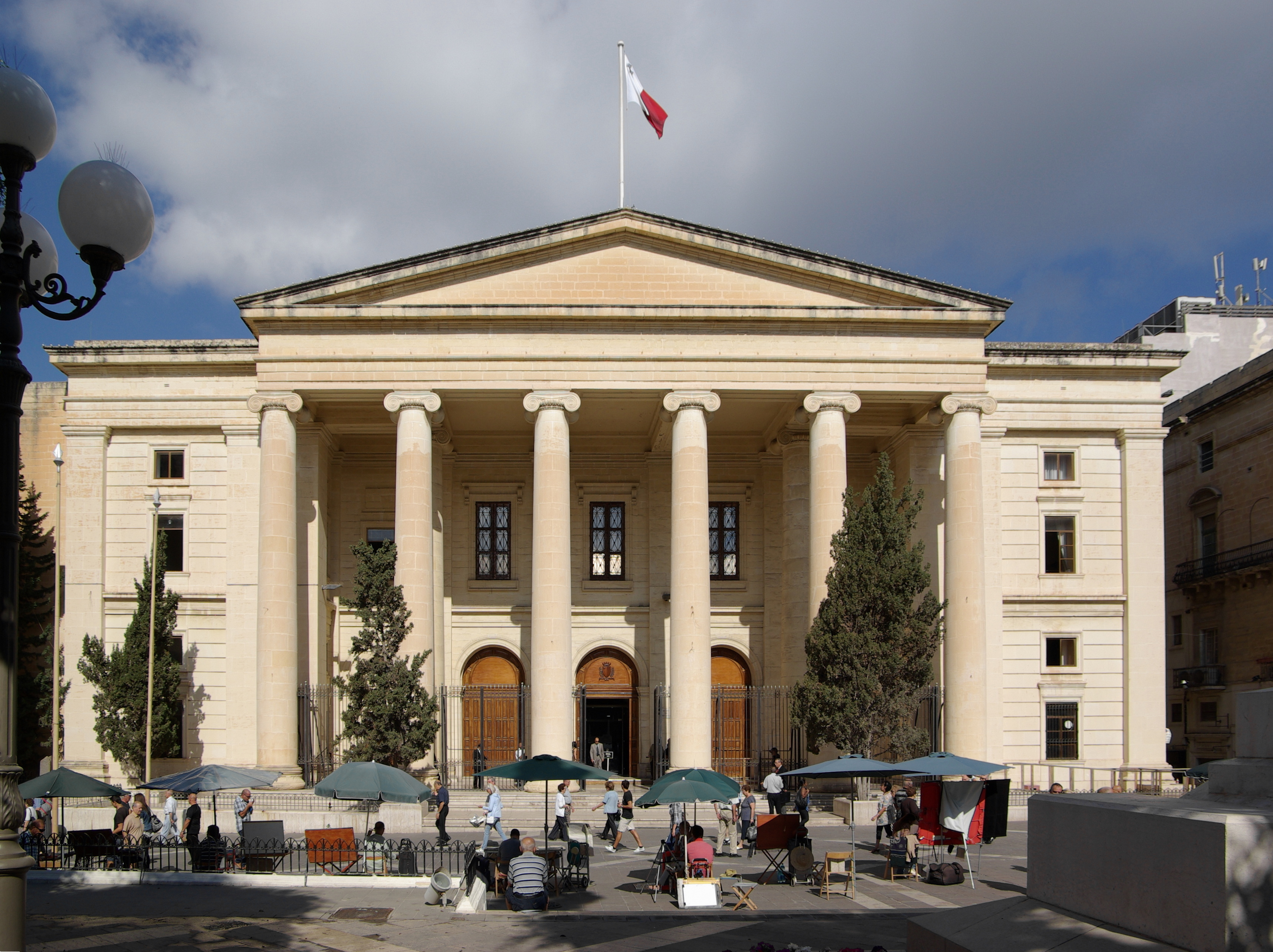
The site of the auberge is now occupied by the Courts of Justice building

In the 19th century it started to be used as for tribunals and court cases, and became at some point it became known as the "Palace of the Courts of Justice". From 1825 onwards, the auberge housed the Tribunale di Pirateria and the Corte di Fallimento, while Governor Sir Henry Bouverie moved the Civil Courts from the Castellania to Auberge d'Auvergne in 1840. The courts of criminal jurisdiction and the office of Police were also moved to the auberge in 1853, and a number of alterations were made to the building under the direction of Superintendent of Government Works William Lamb Arrowsmith. In 1886 an earthquake caused significant damage to the building, rendering it partially unsafe.

The ground floor of the building was occupied by a number of shops, and in the early 20th century part of it housed the Alhambra Cinema. The building was included on the Antiquities List of 1925 together with the other auberges in Valletta. On 23 May 1930, an assassination attempt occurred in the auberge, when Ġanni Miller fired three shots at Prime Minister Lord Strickland.

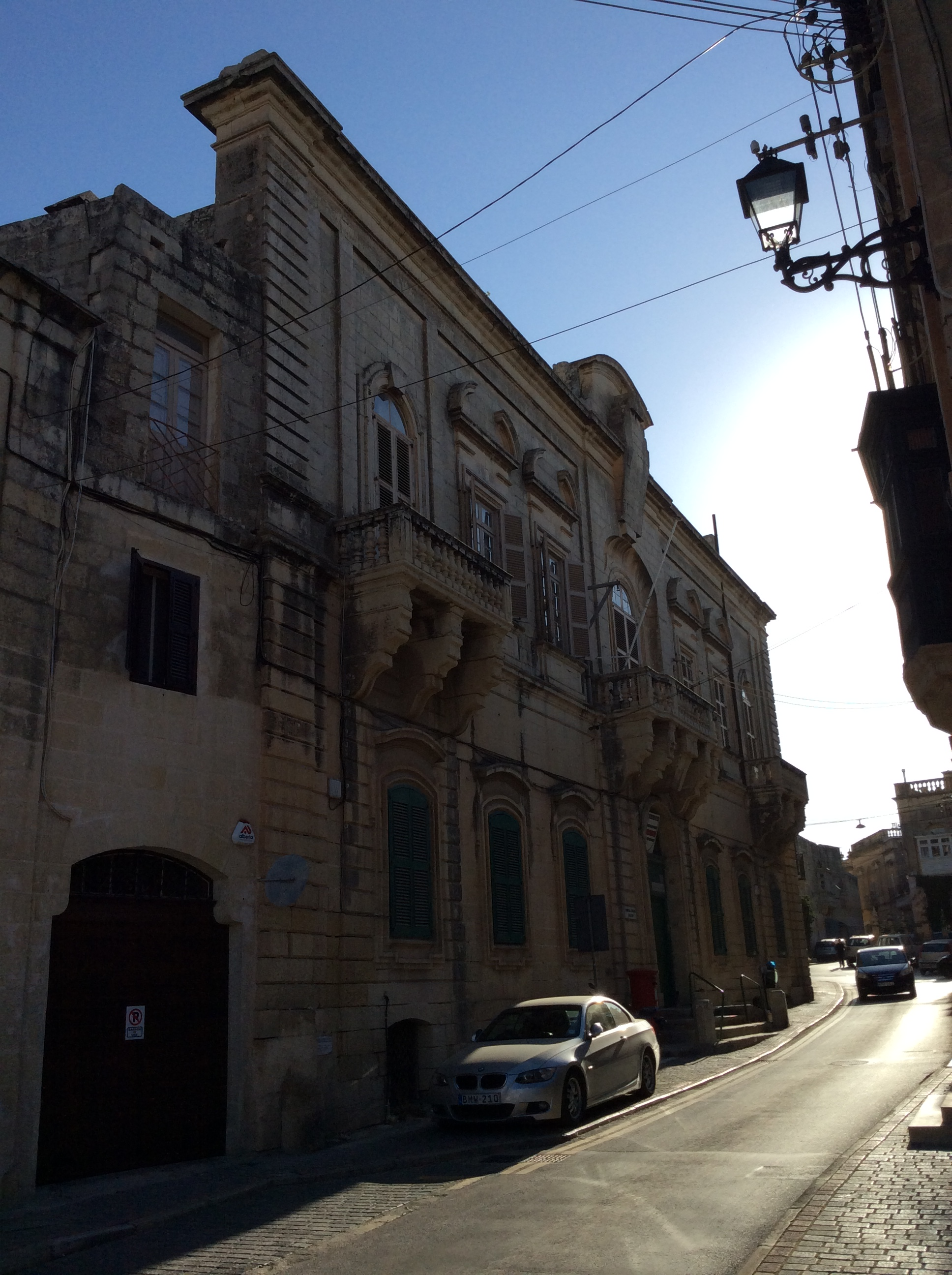
Palazzo Testaferrata, Balzan

On 30 April 1941, during World War II, the auberge and the adjacent Casa Caccia were hit by a German parachute mine, and they were severely damaged. The law courts subsequently moved to another location outside Valletta, in Balzan at Palazzo Testaferrata and at a seminary in Floriana, but in 1943 they returned to the part of the auberge which was still standing. They remained there until 1956, when the premises had to be vacated due to their dilapidated state. From 1956, the Magistrates' Court was situated at Casa Brunet at 107 Old Bakery Street.

The ruins were subsequently demolished, and a new courthouse with a neoclassical design began to be built on the site on 5 May 1965. It was inaugurated on 9 January 1971. The site of the portico is scheduled at grade 3, according to a 2006 decision, as some remains of the auberge may remain below ground.

== Architecture ==
Auberge d'Auvergne was built in the Mannerist style, typical of its architect Girolamo Cassar. The building originally had a square plan with a central courtyard, and it had a somewhat plain façade containing an ornate doorway flanked by three windows on either side. The quoins of the building had rustications similar to those found at Auberge d'Aragon.

After the 1783 enlargement, three further windows were added on the left side of the building, and its façade was no longer symmetrical.
