= Courts of Justice building (Valletta) =

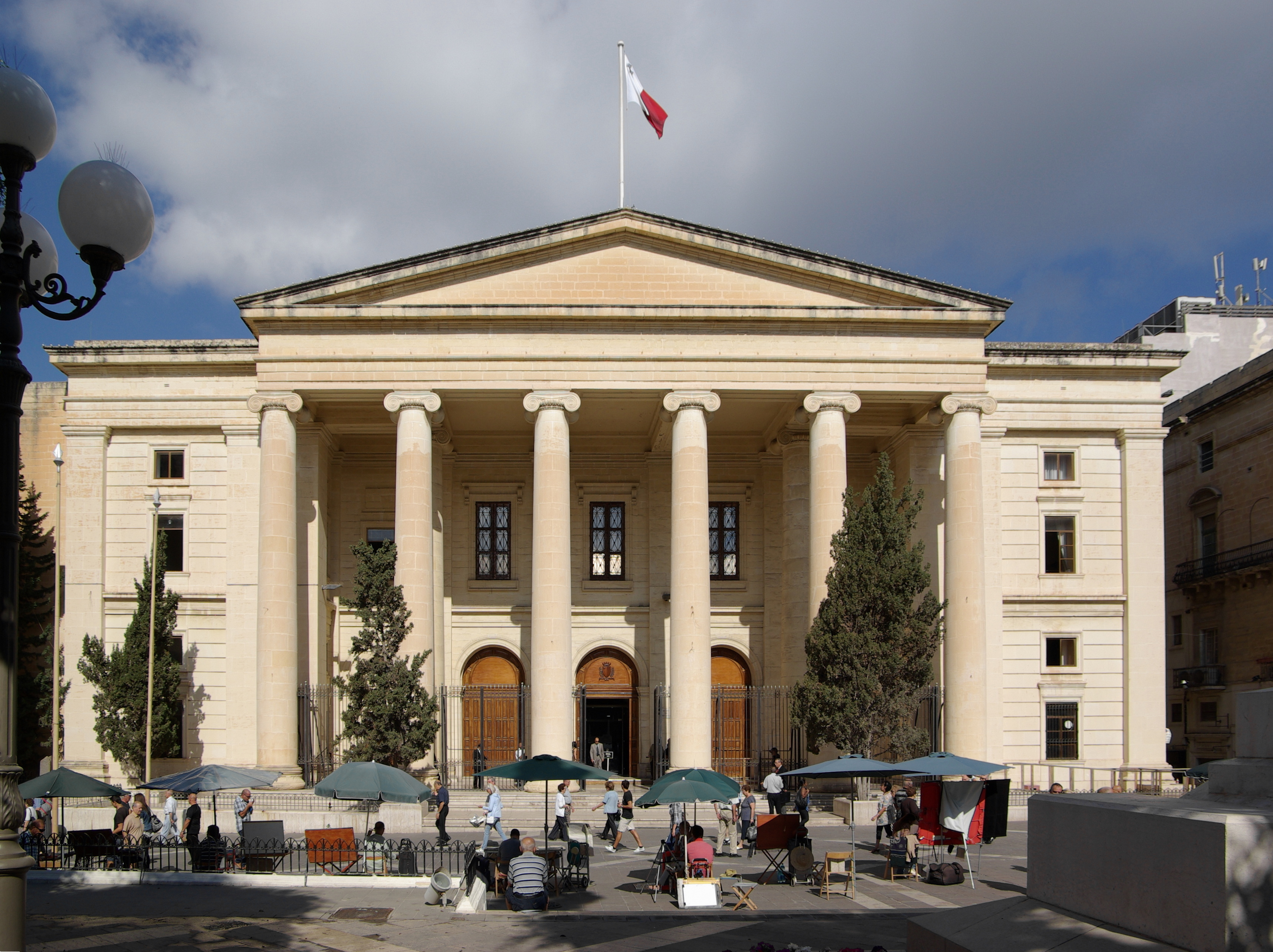
- View of the Courts of Justice building
- Interactive map of the Courts of Justice building area

General information
- Status: Intact
- Type: Courthouse
- Architectural style: Neoclassical
- Location: Valletta, Malta
- Coordinates: 35°53′54″N 14°30′44″E
- Construction started: 5 May 1965
- Inaugurated: 9 January 1971
- Owner: Government of Malta

Technical details
- Material: Soft limestone and reinforced concrete
- Floor count: 7 (4 above street level)

Design and construction
- Architect: Jo Tonna

The Courts of Justice building is a courthouse located in Republic Street, Valletta, Malta. It was built in the neoclassical style between 1965 and 1971 on the site of Auberge d'Auvergne, which had been destroyed by aerial bombardment during World War II.

== History ==
The Courts of Justice building stands on the site of Auberge d'Auvergne, a 16th-century building which housed knights of the Order of Saint John from the langue of Auvergne. The auberge was converted into a courthouse in the 19th century, and it remained so until the building was severely damaged when it was hit by a German parachute mine on 30 April 1941, during World War II.

The law courts moved to another location outside Valletta, but in 1943 they returned to the part of the auberge which was still standing. They remained there until 1956, when the premises had to be vacated due to their dilapidated state. The ruins of the auberge were subsequently demolished, and construction of a new courthouse on the same site began on 5 May 1965.

The present courthouse was inaugurated on 9 January 1971 by Prime Minister George Borg Olivier, Governor-General Maurice Henry Dorman, Archbishop Mikiel Gonzi, and a number of judges, magistrates, ministers and other guests. The first case in the new building was held two days later on 11 January 1971.

The courthouse also houses the Civil Courts Registry, the Court Archives, the police lock-up and a car park. The Valletta Police Station was formerly also housed within the building.

The courthouse has been criticized, in the past, for its lack of security and for having the elevators out of order.

Some buildings, opposite the Law Courts building on Strait Street, are an extension of the courts.

== Architecture ==
The Courts of Justice building is built to the designs of architect Jo Tonna in the neoclassical style, and its main feature is a portico with six columns. The building has seven floors, three of which are below the main front street level. The building occupies an entire block of the city, except one corner which is occupied by the Savoy Building.
