= St Mark's Church, Rabat =

St Mark's Church
- Knisja ta' San Mark
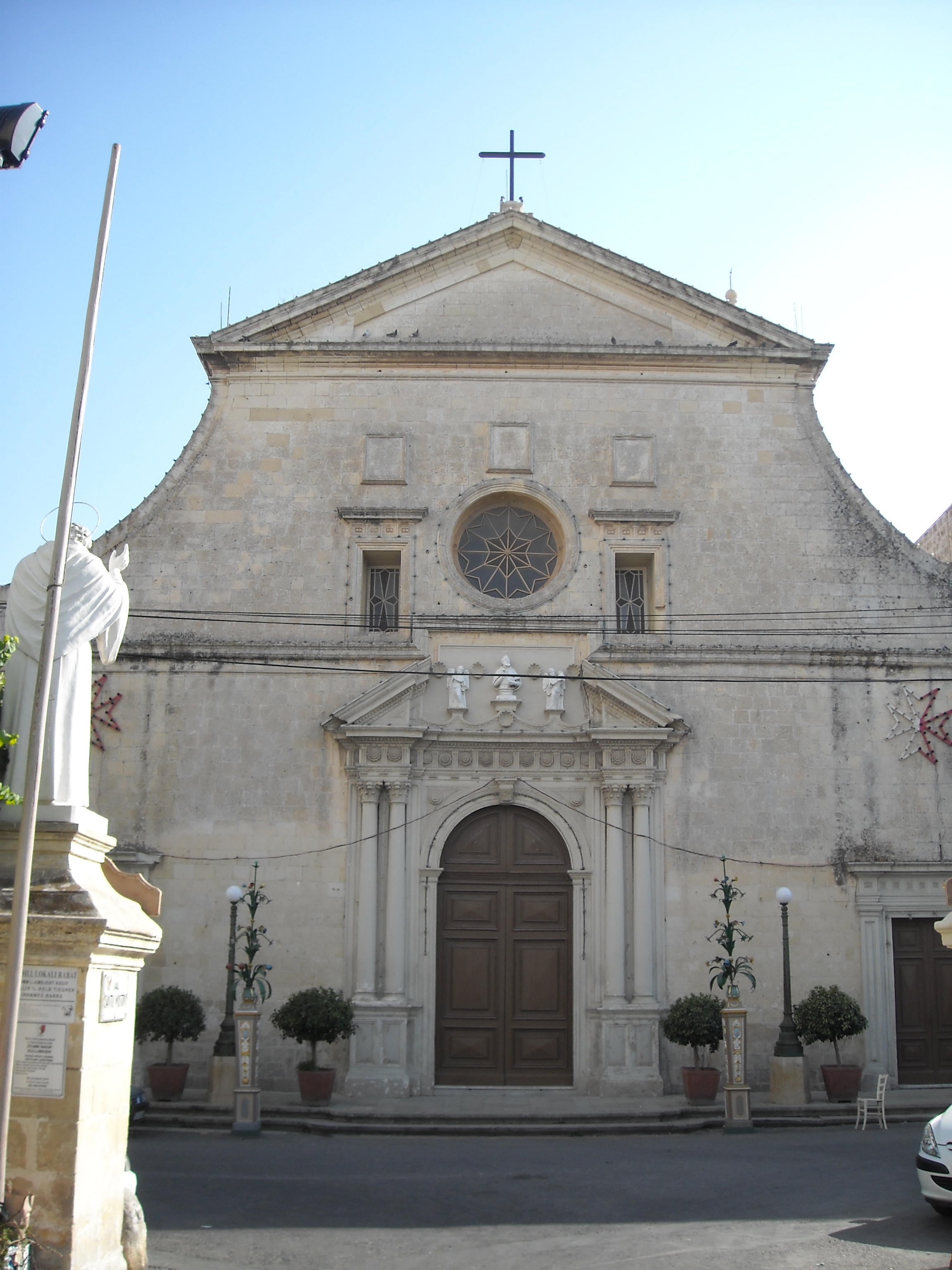
- St Mark's Church
- 35°52′58″N 14°24′08″E
- Location: Rabat
- Country: Malta
- Denomination: Roman Catholic

History
- Status: Active
- Founded: 1571
- Dedication: Mark the Evangelist
- Dedicated: 26 June 1906

Architecture
- Functional status: Church
- Architect: Girolamo Cassar
- Architectural type: Church
- Style: Baroque; Renaissance
- Groundbreaking: 1571
- Completed: 1588

Administration
- Archdiocese: Malta

Clergy
- Archbishop: Charles Scicluna

The Church of St Mark is a Roman Catholic Augustinian church located in Rabat, Malta.

== History ==
Augustinians first arrived in Malta in 1383. Their first convent and church were built outside the walls of Mdina however these were demolished in 1555 due to an attack by the Ottomans. A new land and an adjacent church dedicated to St Mark were given to the Augustinians to build their new friary. Plans were drawn up by Girolamo Cassar and work commenced in 1571. The church and convent were completed in 1588. The church was built with a Renaissance style facade, unique to Malta. Only few alterations were made since then, preserving the church in the original state as it was when built. The church facade was restored in 2016.
