= Langue (Knights Hospitaller) =

Administrative division of the Knights Hospitaller

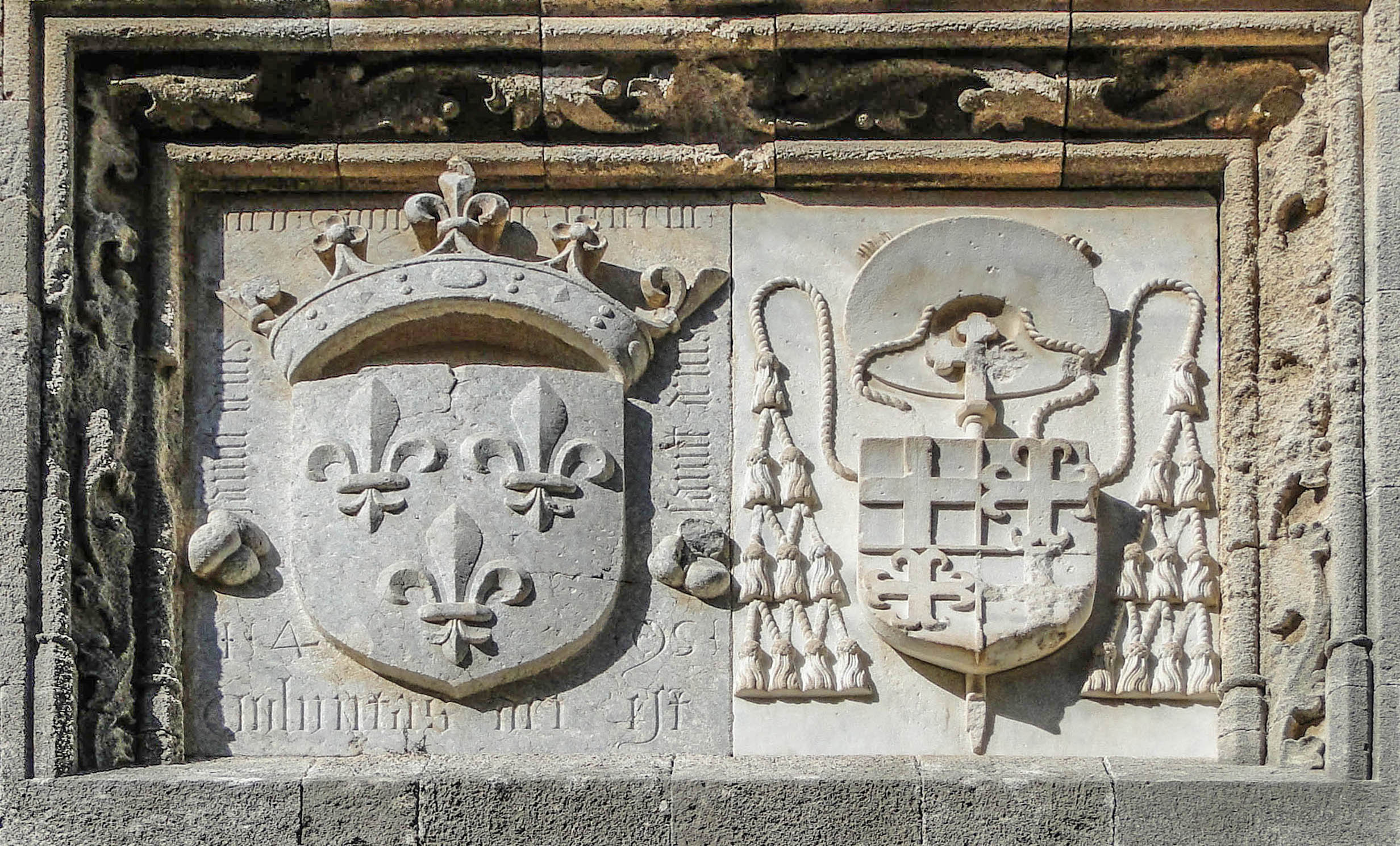
Coat of arms of the Langue of France (left) and of Grand Master Pierre d'Aubusson (right) on the French auberge in Rhodes

A langue or tongue (Italian: lingua) was an administrative division of the Knights Hospitaller (also known as the Order of St. John of Jerusalem) between 1319 and 1798. The term referred to a rough ethno-linguistic division of the geographical distribution of the Order's members and possessions. Each langue was subdivided into Priories or Grand Priories, Bailiwicks and Commanderies, and was responsible for a certain sector in their administration. Each langue had an auberge as its headquarters, some of which still survive in Rhodes, Birgu and Valletta.

== History ==
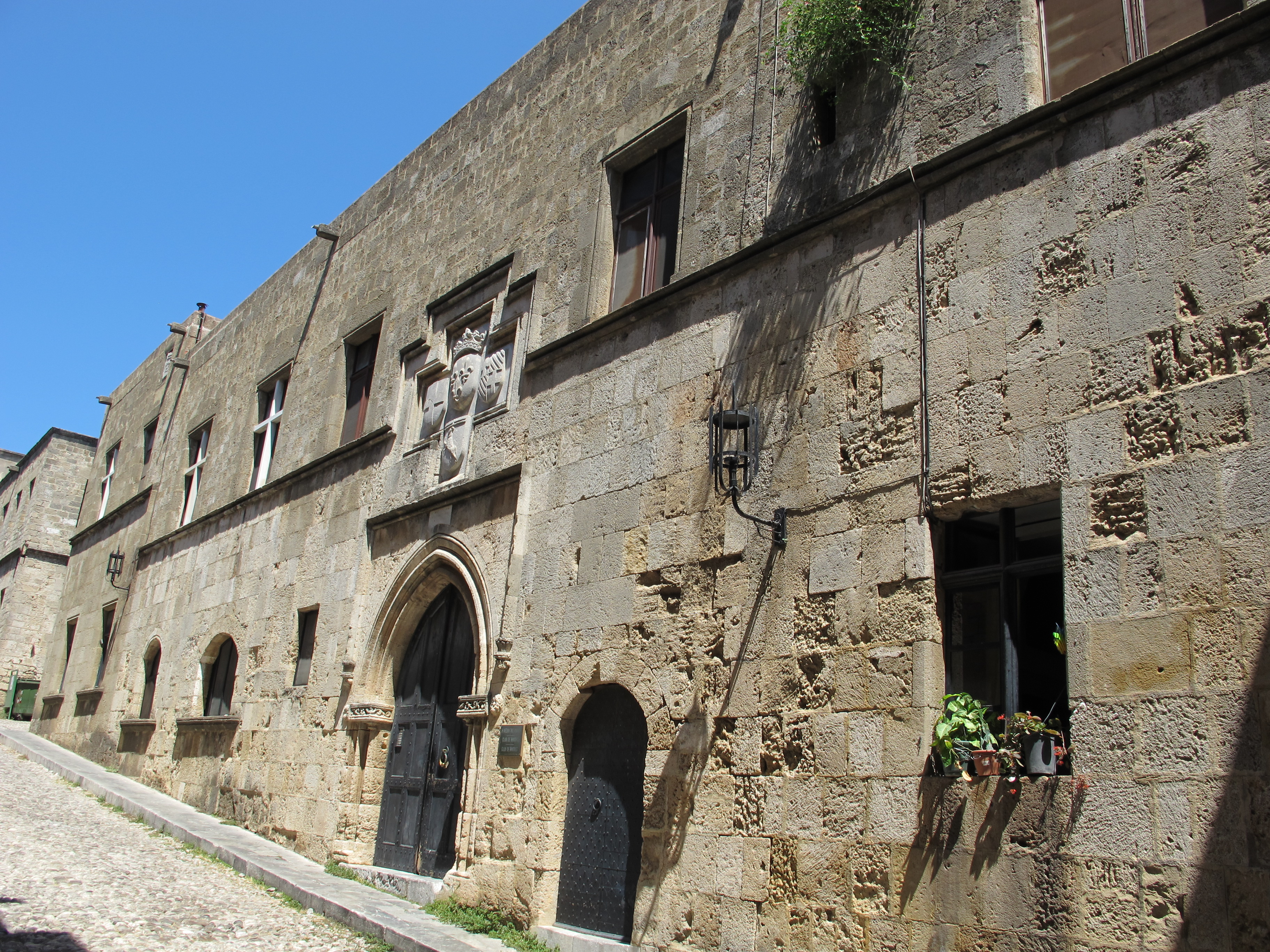
Auberge of Provence in Rhodes

The Knights Hospitaller began to take the features of a state following its acquisition of Rhodes and nearby islands in the early 14th century. The subdivision of the Order into langues began in 1319 during a meeting of the Chapter General in Montpellier. For the purposes of administration of the Order's possessions in Europe, the langues were divided into grand priories, some of which were further divided into priories or bailiwicks, and at the lowest level into commandries dealing with regional or local administration.

The head of each langue was known as a pilier or bailiff. The piliers, together with the Knights Grand Cross, the bishop, the bailiffs of the convents and the prior of the Conventual Church, sat on the Grand Council of the Order. Each pilier also had specific responsibilities within the order; that of France was the Hospitaller, that of Italy was the Admiral of the Order's fleet.

When the system of the langues was established in the 14th century, there were seven langues split according to ethno-linguistic divisions:

- Langue of Auvergne
- Langue of France
- Langue of Provence
- Langue of Aragon
- Langue of Italy
- Langue of Germany (including all of the Holy Roman Empire as well as Scandinavia, Hungary and Poland)
- Langue of England (including Scotland and Ireland)

In 1462, the Langue of Aragon was divided with the creation of

- Langue of Castille, León and Portugal

The Langue of England was dissolved in the mid-16th century following the English Reformation. The langue was reinstituted by Grand Master Emmanuel de Rohan-Polduc in 1784 as the Anglo-Bavarian Langue, which also included Bavarian and Polish knights. It was housed in Auberge de Bavière, which had been built as a private palazzo.

St. John's Co-Cathedral in Valletta, which was built as the Order's conventual church, contains chapels for each of the langues.

== Auberges ==
The headquarters of each langue was known as an auberge, a French word meaning "inn". Auberges were first built in Rhodes in the late Middle Ages.

After the Order moved to Malta in 1530, auberges were built in Birgu between the 1530s and the 1550s, and later in Valletta from the 1570s onwards.

In the 1540s, the Governor of Tripoli was granted the authority to establish auberges in Hospitaller Tripoli.

=== Aragon ===
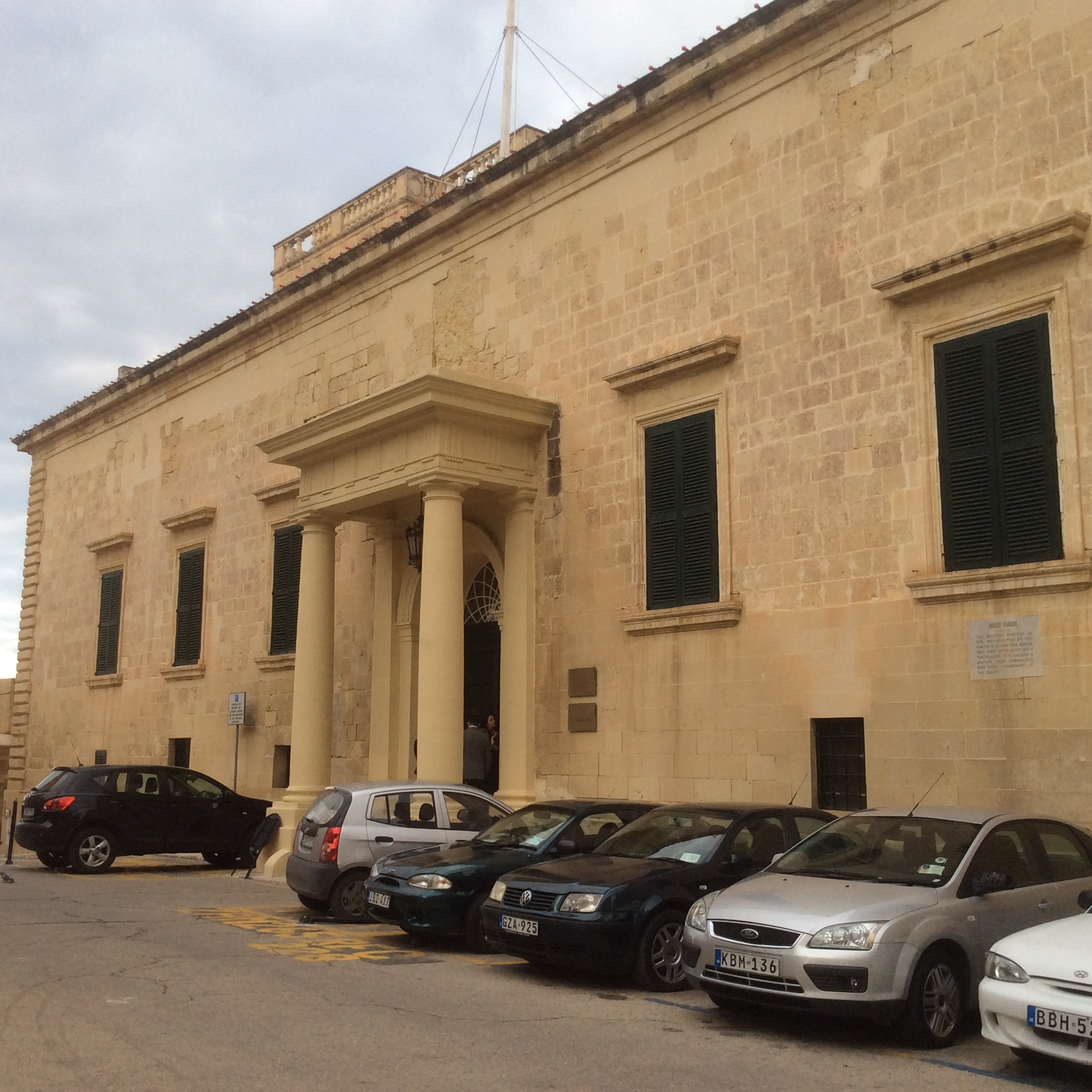
Auberge d'Aragon in Valletta

- Auberge d'Aragon in Birgu was built sometime in the 16th century in the traditional Maltese style. The building is still intact but its façade has been heavily altered.
- Auberge d'Aragon in Valletta was built in 1571 in the Mannerist style, to a design of Girolamo Cassar. It is the only auberge in Valletta which still retains its original design, the only alteration being a portico which was added in the 1840s. It now houses the Ministry for European Affairs and Equality.

=== Auvergne ===
- The auberge in Birgu was built in around 1531 in the traditional Maltese style, and it was eventually incorporated into Auberge d'Auvergne et Provence. The building is still intact but its façade has been heavily altered.
- Auberge d'Auvergne in Valletta was built between the 1570s and 1583 in the Mannerist style, to a design of Girolamo Cassar, and it was enlarged in 1783. The building was partially destroyed during World War II by aerial bombardment in 1941, and the ruins were demolished in the 1950s to make way for the Courts of Justice building.

=== Castille, León and Portugal ===
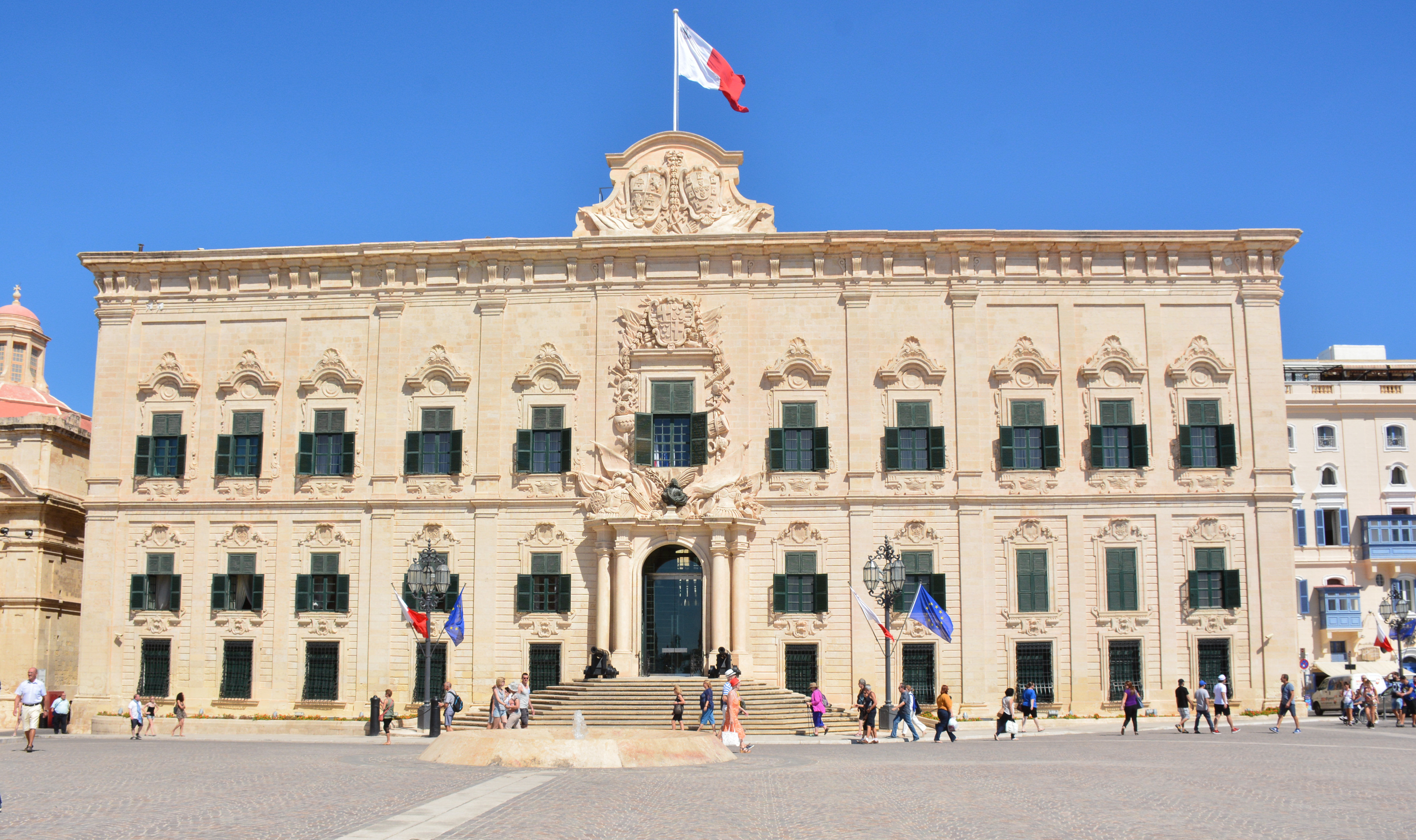
Auberge de Castille in Valletta

- The first auberge in Birgu was built in the 1530s. Its exact location is unknown and no remains of the building are believed to have survived.
- The second auberge in Birgu was built in the 1550s in the traditional Maltese style, to a design of Niccolò Bellavante. The building still exists, but it has been heavily altered and very few features of the auberge have survived.
- Auberge de Castille in Valletta was built between 1571 and 1574 in the Mannerist style, to a design of Girolamo Cassar. It was completely rebuilt between 1741 and 1745 in the Baroque style, to a design of Andrea Belli. It now houses the Office of the Prime Minister of Malta.

=== England and the Anglo-Bavarian Langue ===
- Auberge d'Angleterre in Birgu was built in around 1534 in the traditional Maltese style. Today, it is the best preserved auberge in Birgu and it is used as a public library.
- Auberge de Bavière in Valletta was built as Palazzo Carniero in 1696 to a design of Carlo Gimach. When the Anglo-Bavarian Langue was instituted in 1784, it began to be used as the langue's auberge. The building now houses the Lands Authority.
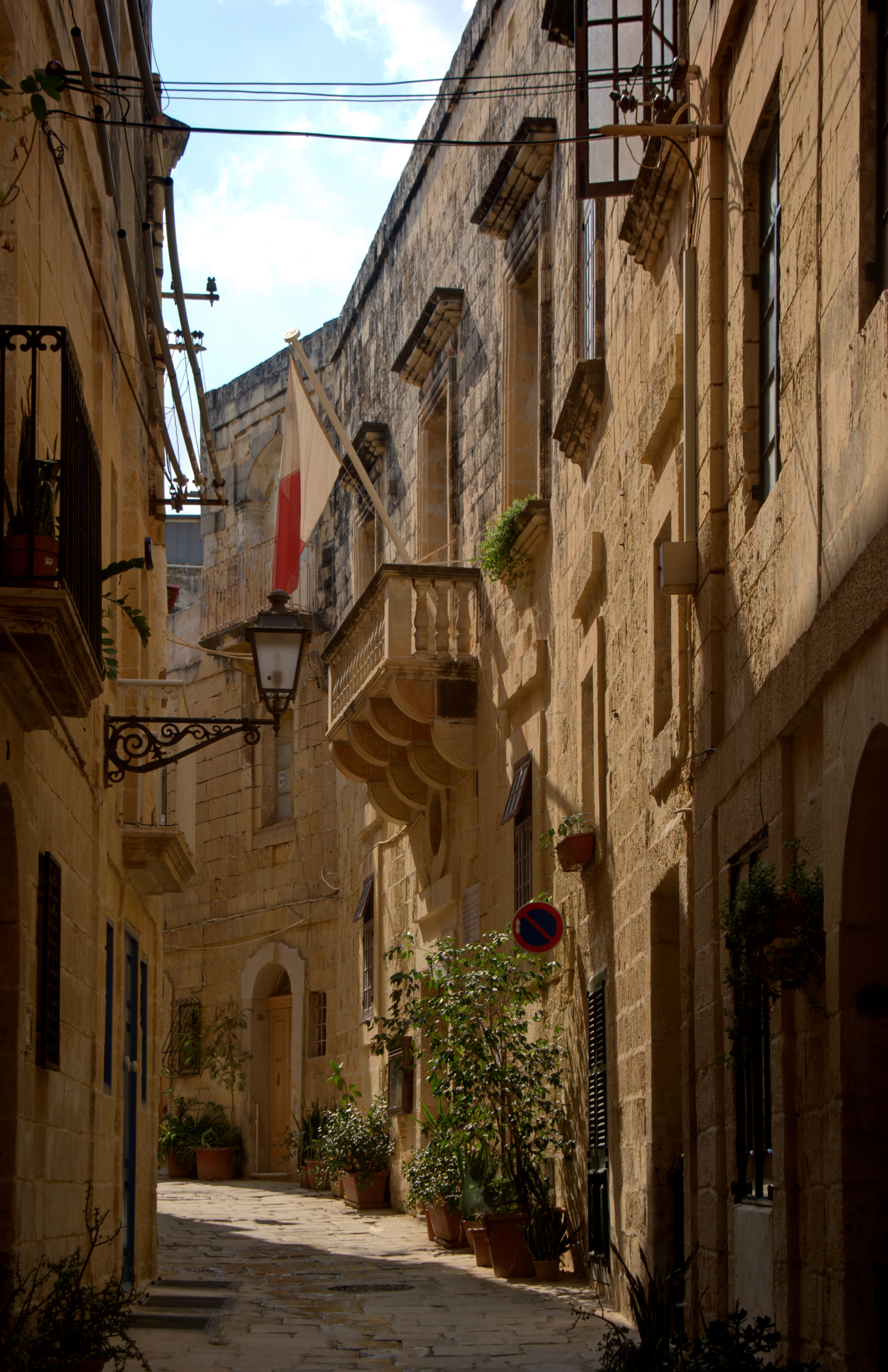
Auberge d'Angleterre in Birgu

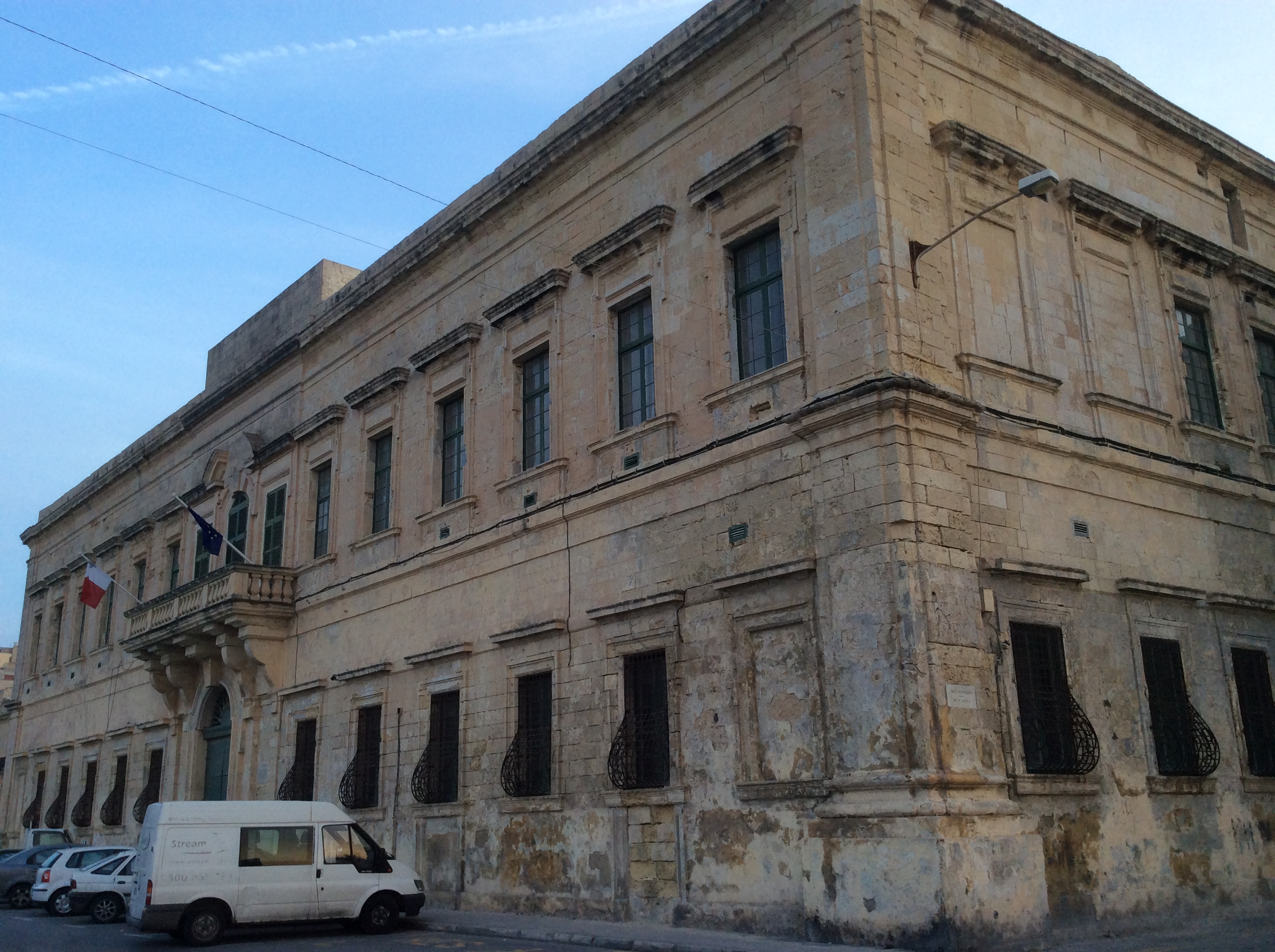
Auberge de Bavière in Valletta

=== France ===
- Auberge de France in Birgu was built in around 1533 in the traditional Maltese style, to a design of Nicolo Flavari. It was later redesigned by Bartolomeo Genga. It is the second best preserved auberge in Birgu, and it now houses the city's local council.
- The first auberge in Valletta was built in around 1570 to a design of Girolamo Cassar. Parts of the building are still intact although they have been heavily altered.
- The second Auberge de France in Valletta was built in around 1583 in the Mannerist style, also to a design of Cassar. The building was largely destroyed by aerial bombardment in 1942, and the ruins were demolished to make way for the Workers' Memorial Building.

=== Italy ===
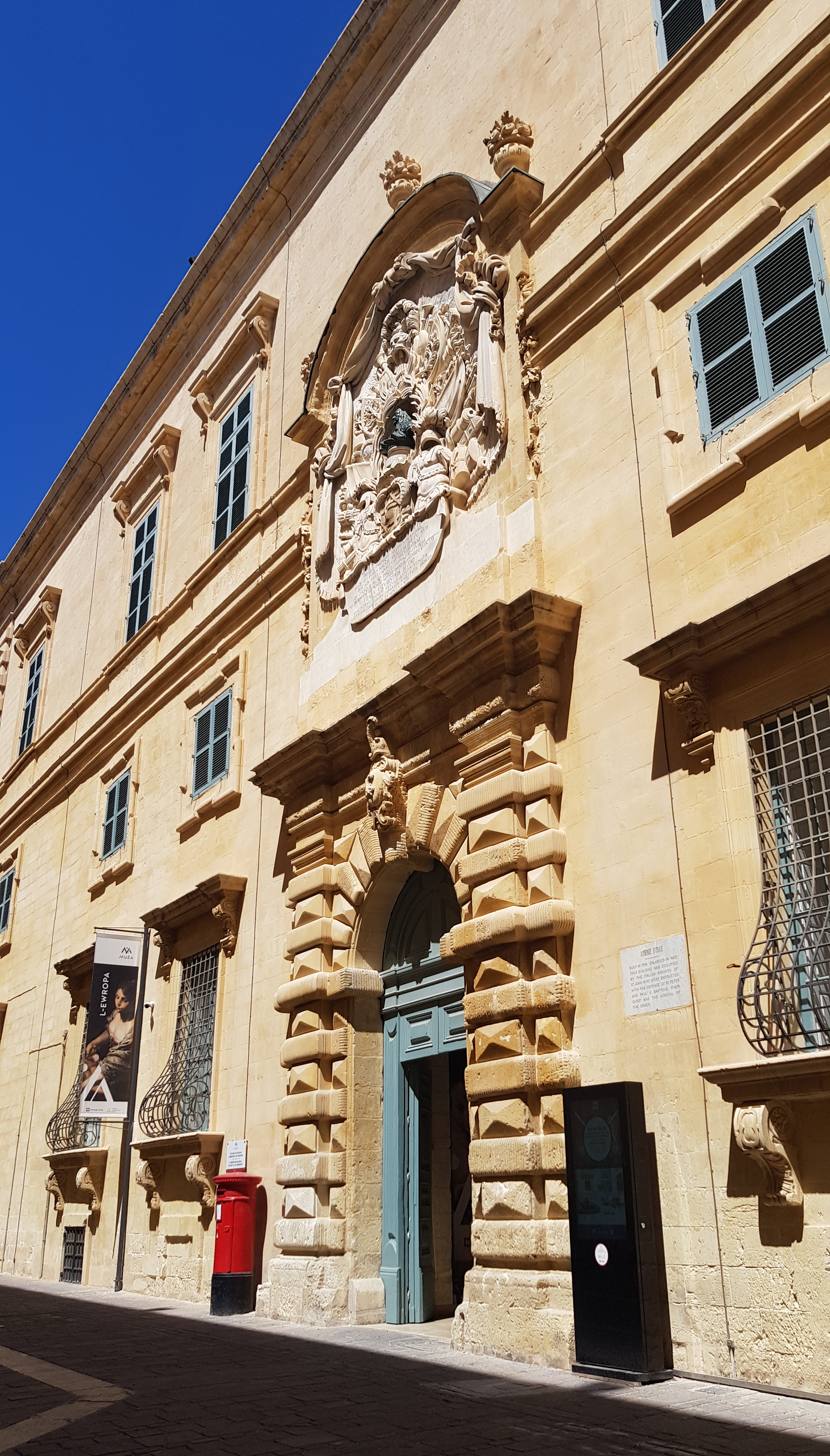
Auberge d'Italie in Valletta

- Auberge d'Italie in Birgu was first built in the 1530s, but it was rebuilt in 1553–54 to a design of Niccolò Bellavante. It was largely destroyed by aerial bombardment in World War II, but some surviving features were integrated into the façade of new buildings in the 1960s.
- The first auberge in Valletta was built in 1570–71 to a design of Girolamo Cassar. It was eventually incorporated into the Grandmaster's Palace.
- The second Auberge d'Italie in Valletta was built in 1574–79 and 1582–95 in the Mannerist style to a design of Cassar and other architects. It was extensively redecorated in the Baroque style in the 1680s. The building currently houses Malta's national art museum, MUŻA.

=== Germany ===
- Auberge d'Allemagne in Birgu was built sometime in the 16th century in the traditional Maltese style. It was largely destroyed by aerial bombardment during World War II, but some surviving rooms were integrated into new buildings in the 1960s.
- Auberge d'Allemagne in Valletta was built between 1571 and 1575 in the Mannerist style, to a design of Girolamo Cassar. It was demolished in 1839 to make way for St Paul's Pro-Cathedral.

=== Provence ===
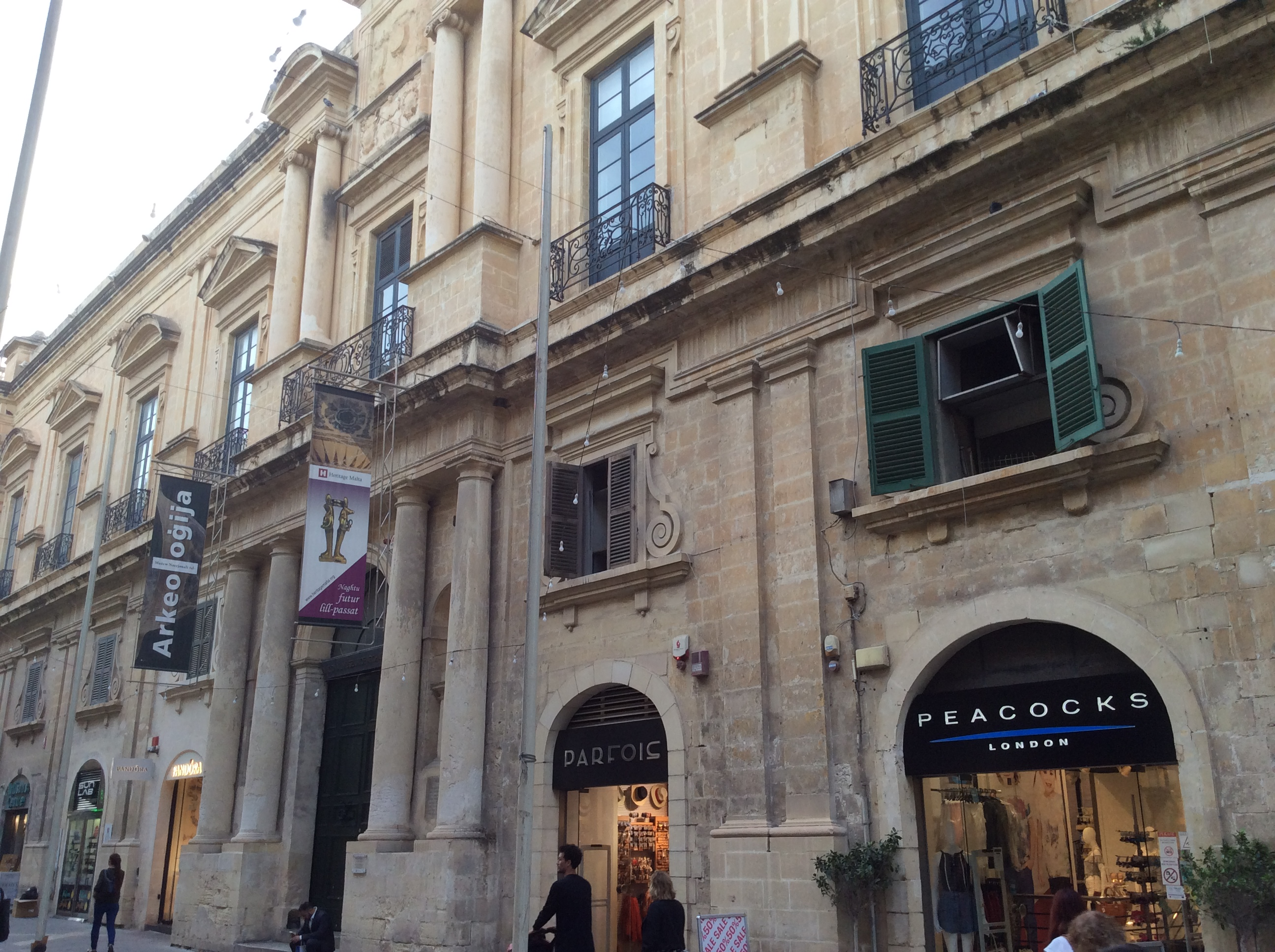
Auberge de Provence in Valletta

- The auberge in Birgu was built in around 1531 in the traditional Maltese style, and it was eventually incorporated into Auberge d'Auvergne et Provence. The building is still intact but its façade has had some minor alterations.
- Auberge de Provence in Valletta was built in the 1570s in the Mannerist style, to a design of Girolamo Cassar. It was extensively redesigned in 1638 by Mederico Blondel. The building currently houses the National Museum of Archaeology.

== See also ==
- Commanderies of the Order of Saint John
