= Auberge de France =

Auberge in Valletta, Malta

First Auberge de France
- Berġa ta' Franza
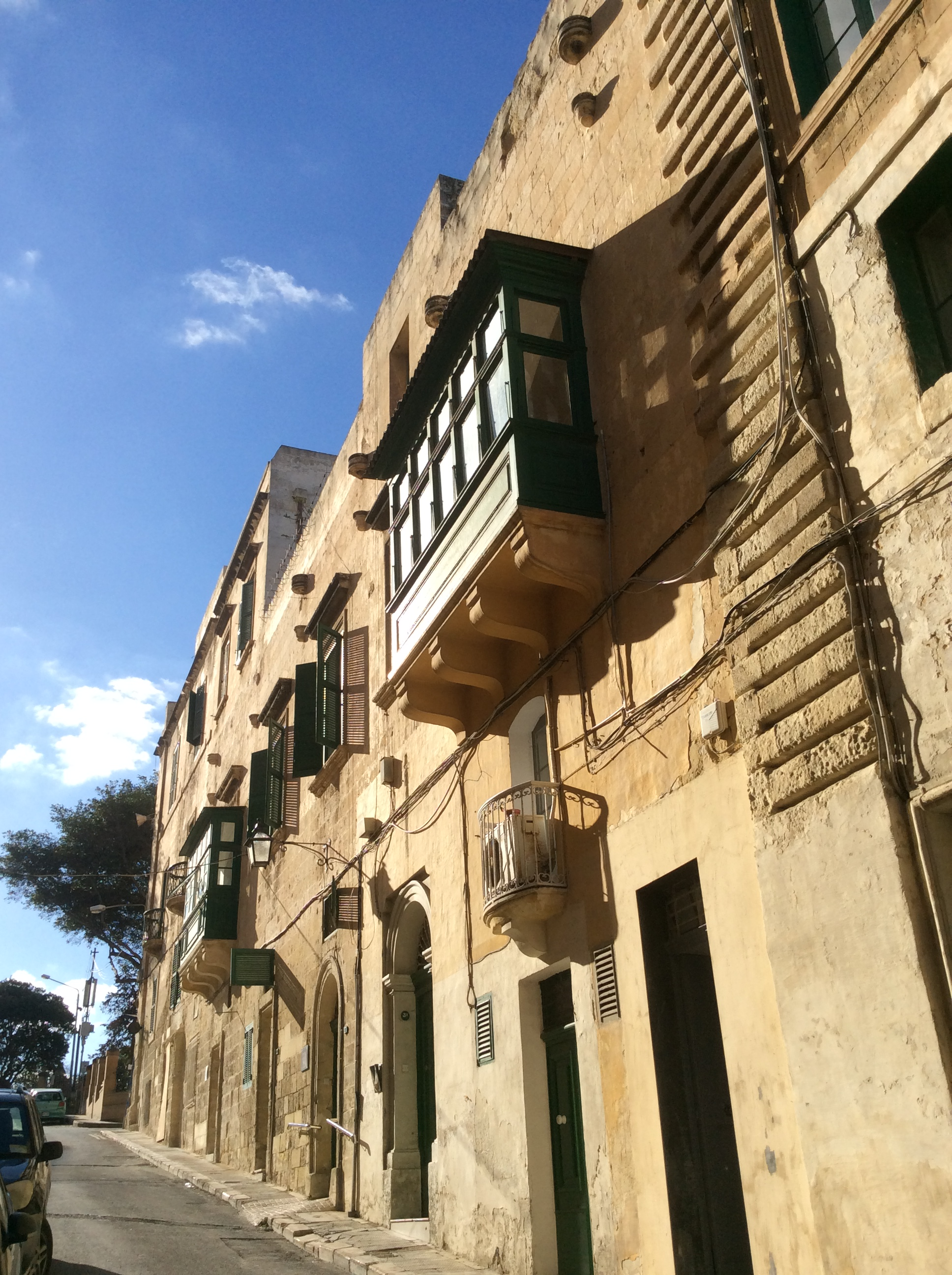
- View of the first Auberge de France, in Valletta, in 2016
- Interactive map of the First; Auberge de France area

General information
- Status: Partially intact
- Type: Auberge
- Architectural style: Mannerist
- Location: Valletta, Malta
- Coordinates: 35°53′53.2″N 14°30′31.5″E
- Construction started: c. 1570

Technical details
- Material: Limestone

Design and construction
- Architect: Girolamo Cassar

Second Auberge de France
- Berġa ta' Franza
- View of the second Auberge de France in the late 19th century
- Interactive map of the Second; Auberge de France area

General information
- Status: Destroyed
- Type: Auberge
- Architectural style: Mannerist
- Location: Valletta, Malta
- Coordinates: 35°53′52.1″N 14°30′34.2″E
- Construction started: c. 1588
- Destroyed: 8 April 1942

Technical details
- Material: Limestone

Design and construction
- Architect: Girolamo Cassar

Auberge de France (Maltese: Berġa ta' Franza) refers to two auberges in Valletta, Malta. They were both built in the 16th century to house knights of the Order of Saint John from the langue of France, which induced the entire Kingdom of France except for Auvergne and Provence which were separate langues.

After 1570, the first auberge was constructed; it is still mostly intact. Built after 1588, the second, larger auberge was destroyed by aerial bombardment in 1942. The site of the latter is now occupied by the Workers' Memorial Building, which was constructed in the 1960s.

== First auberge ==
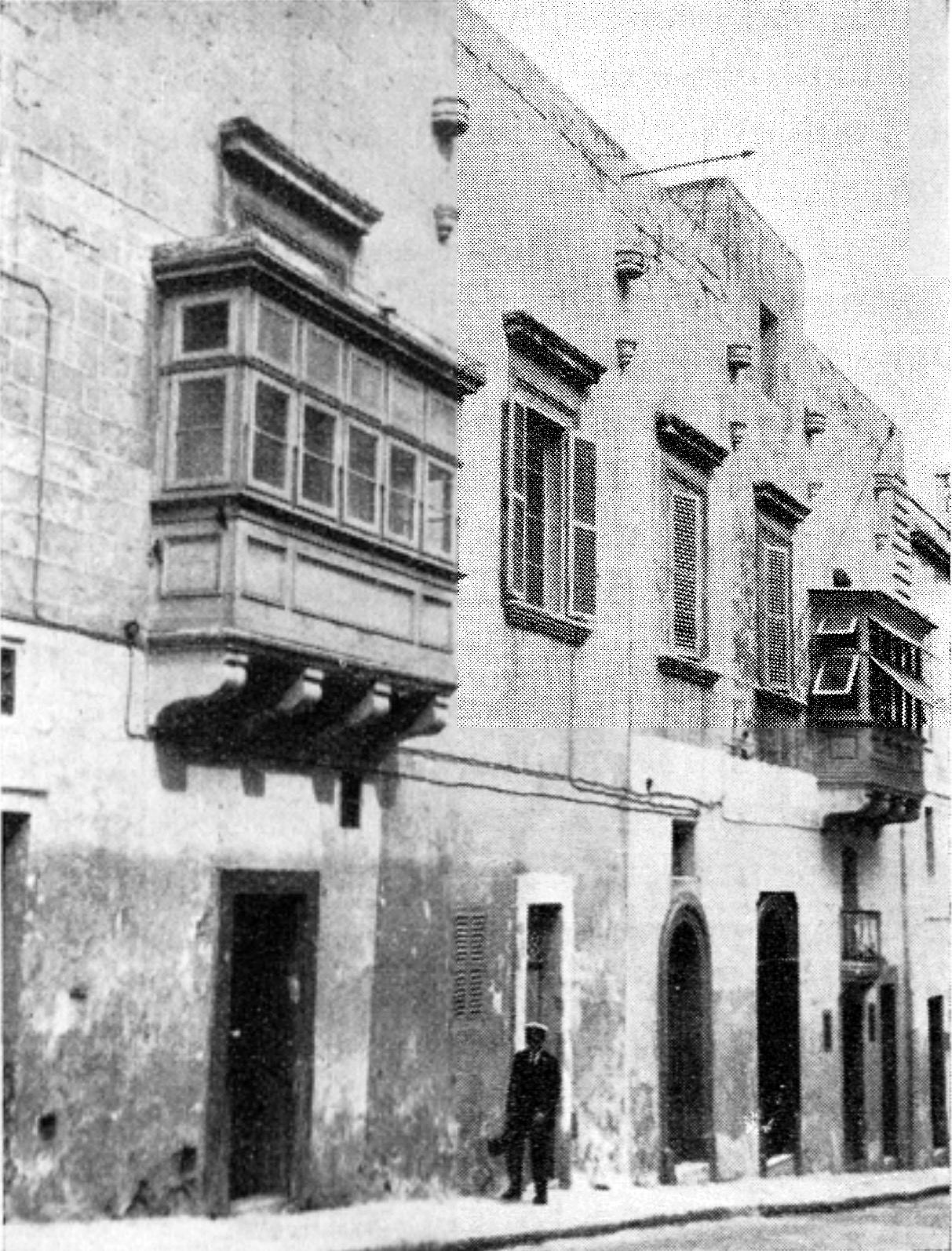
The first Auberge de France in the 1880s

Following the transfer of the capital city of Malta from Birgu to Valletta, the langue of France had to move from its original auberge in Birgu to a new site in Valletta. The first French auberge in Valletta was built some time after 1570, on a site bounded by Old Mint Street, South Street, Scots Street and Windmill Street, and it was designed by the Maltese architect Girolamo Cassar. It remained in use until the construction of the second auberge some time after 1588.

The original auberge later temporary housed the German langue while Auberge d'Allemagne was undergoing repairs in 1604, and part of it was later leased to the Treasury to house the mint of the Order until 1788. Parts of this building, including most of the façade except for the main doorway, are still in existence.

== Second auberge ==
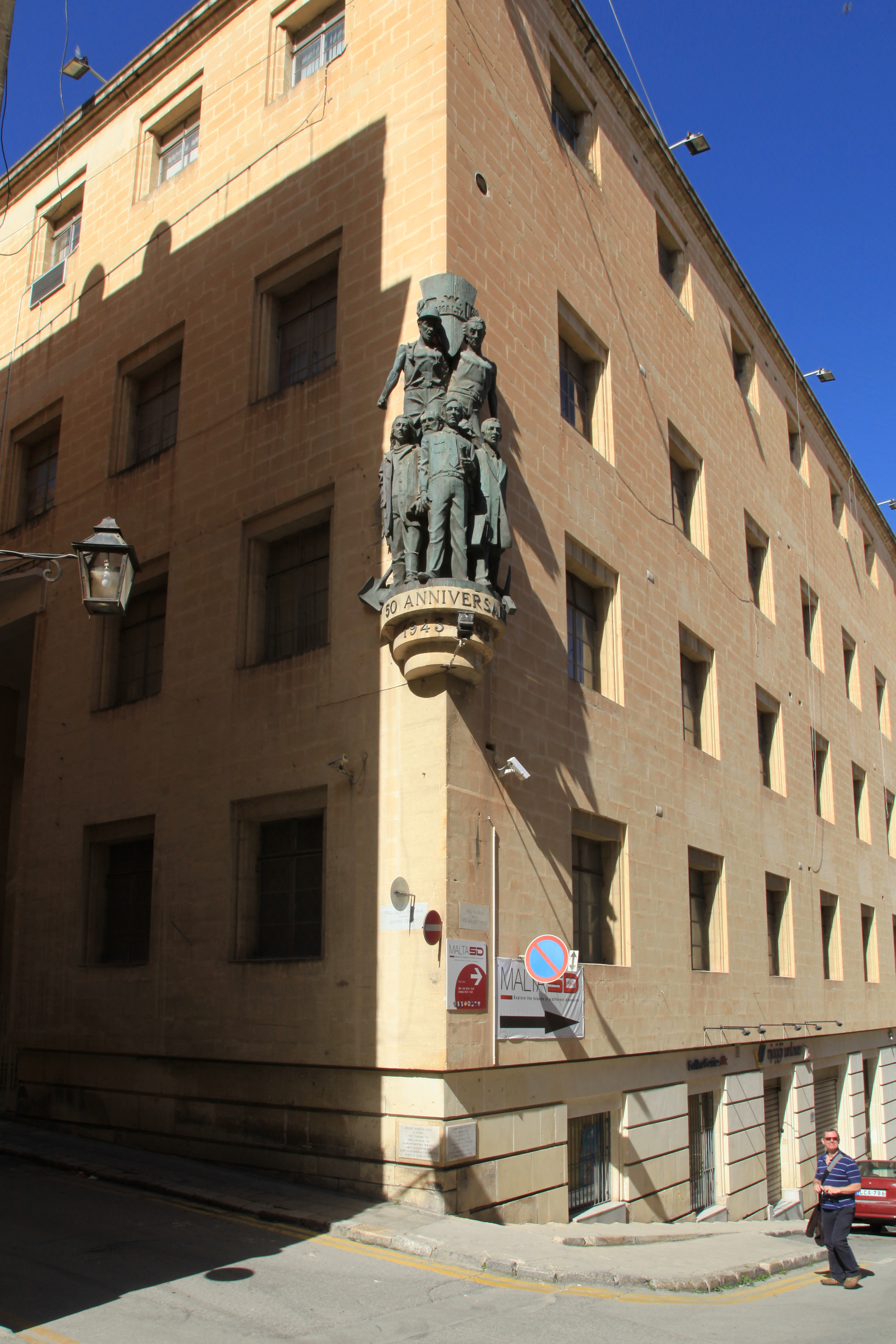
The site of the second Auberge de France is now occupied by the Workers' Memorial Building

By the 1580s, this first auberge was too small to house the langue of France, so on 2 April 1588 the French langue requested to transfer its headquarters to a plot on the corner of South Street and Old Bakery Street. This site was occupied by the house of Bali Fra Christopher le Bolver dit Montgauldry, which was eventually incorporated into the new auberge. The second auberge is claimed to have been designed by Cassar, but there are other claims that suggest it was by another architect.

The second auberge continued to house the langue of France until 1798, when the Order left Malta due to the French occupation. It was subsequently used for a number of purposes, and by the 1830s, it was the residence of the Commissary General. The building was included on the Antiquities List of 1925 together with the other auberges in Valletta. At the time of its destruction, the auberge was the headquarters of the Department of Education.

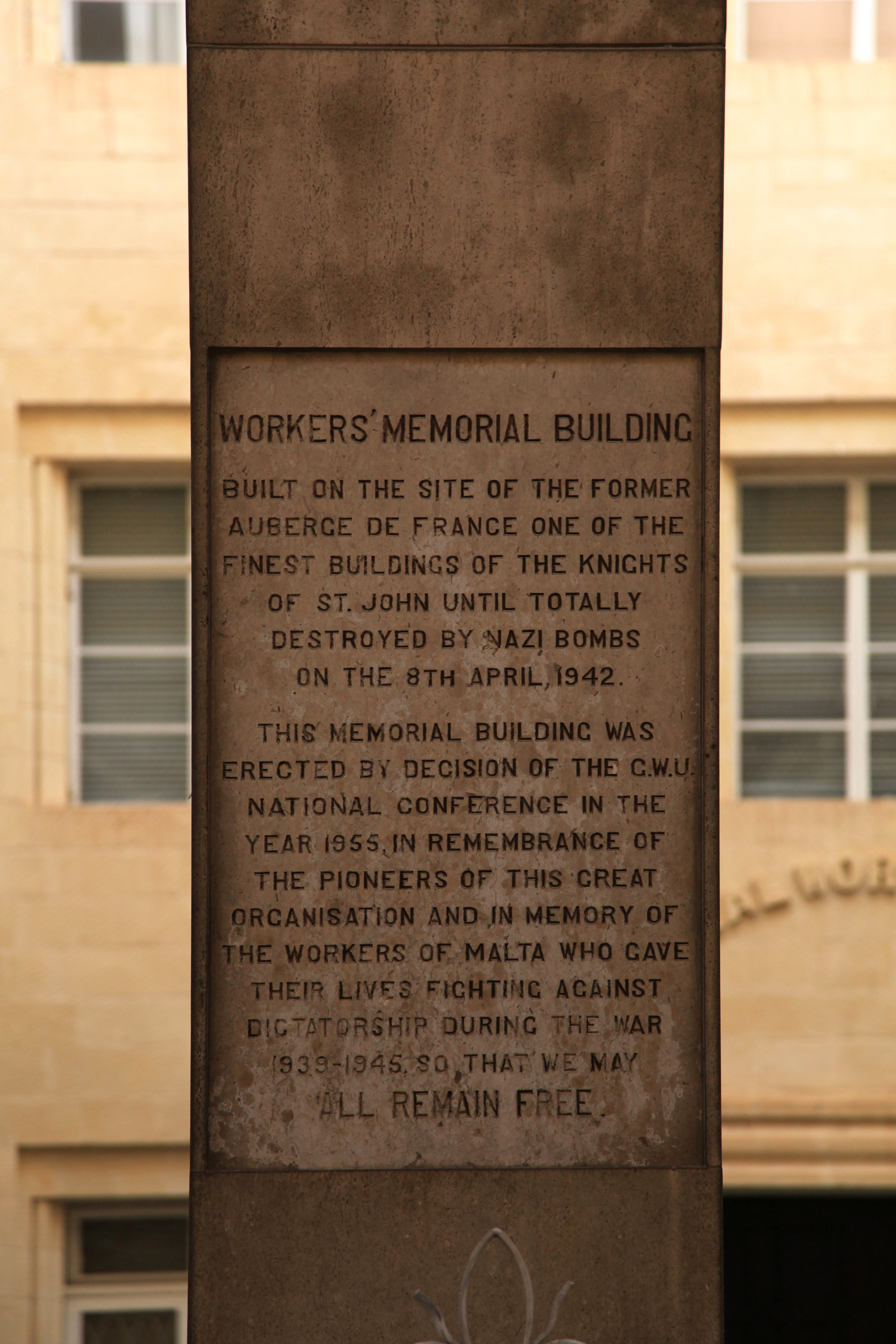
Plaque on the Workers' Memorial Building making a reference to the second Auberge de France

On 8 April 1942, during World War II, Auberge de France was hit by a German heavy-calibre bomb and it was completely destroyed. The ruins were cleared after the war and the Workers' Memorial Building was erected in its place in the 1960s. This building houses the offices of the General Workers' Union.

The second Auberge de France was built in the Mannerist style, typical of its architect Girolamo Cassar. However, the building's layout differed from Cassar's usual design, since a pre-existing structure was integrated into the auberge. This resulted in an asymmetrical façade, with the main entrance being located to the right, and with its windows having a variety of designs and sizes. The auberge's courtyard was located at the rear of the building.

A plaque on the Workers' Memorial Building describes the auberge as "one of the finest buildings of the Knights of St. John".
