= Girolamo Cassar =

Maltese architect and military engineer

- Ġlormu Cassar
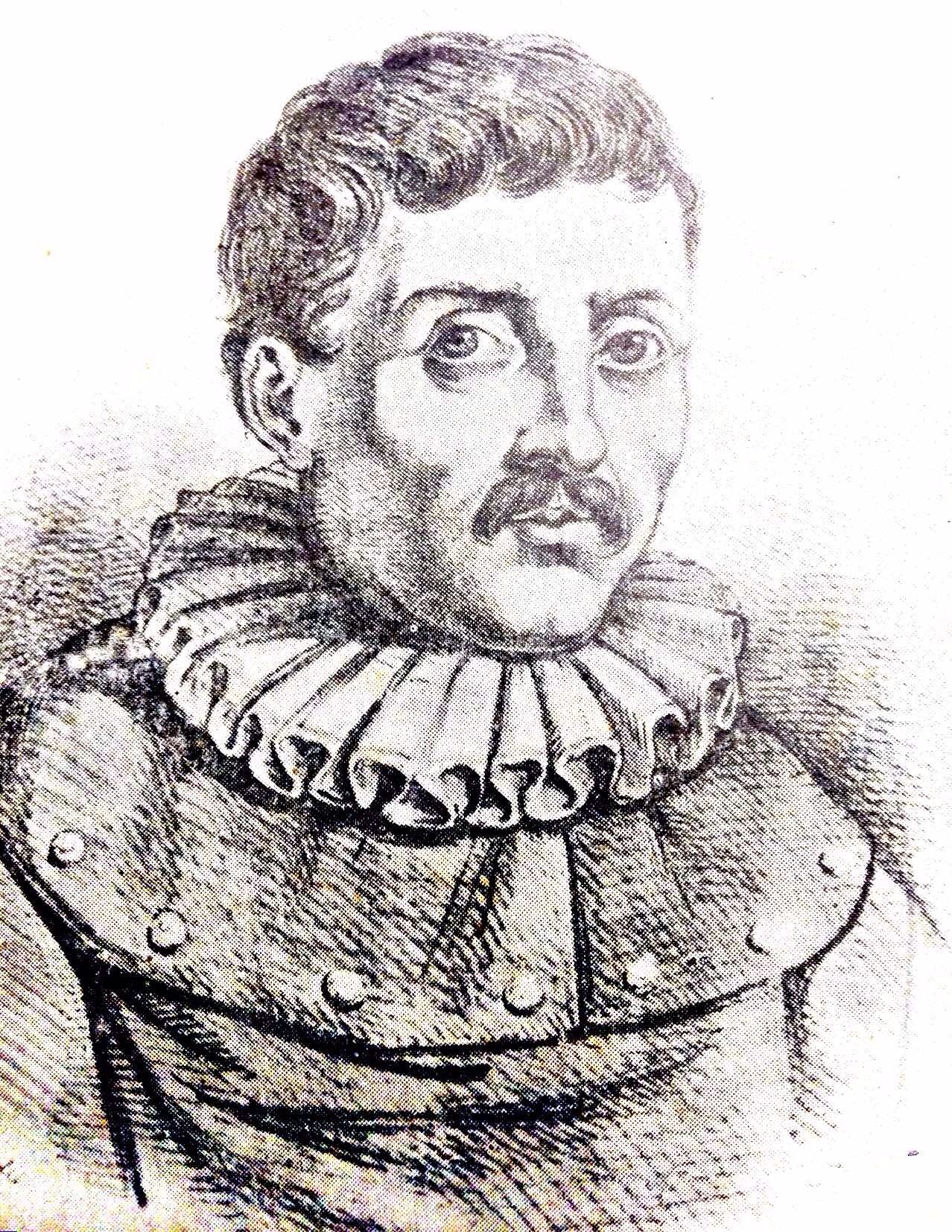
- A 19th century conjectural portrait of Cassar
- Born: c. 1520; Gudja, Malta, Kingdom of Sicily
- Died: c. 1592; Valletta, Hospitaller Malta
- Resting place: Church of Porto Salvo, Valletta
- Occupations: Architect and military engineer
- Employer: Order of St. John
- Notable work: Various buildings in Valletta, including St John's Co-Cathedral, the Grandmaster's Palace and the auberges
- Style: Mannerist
- Spouse(s): Isabella de Torres; Matthia Cassia
- Children: Vittorio Cassar; Gabriele Cassar; Marietitina Cassar; Battistina Cassar; Caterinella Cassar; Gio Domenico (extra matrimonial)

Girolamo Cassar (Maltese: Ġlormu Cassar, c. 1520 – c. 1592) was a Maltese architect and military engineer. He was the resident engineer of the Order of St. John, and was admitted into the Order in 1567. He was involved in the construction of Valletta, initially as an assistant to Francesco Laparelli, before taking over the project himself. He designed many public, religious and private buildings in the new capital city, including St John's Co-Cathedral, the Grandmaster's Palace and the auberges. He was the father of Vittorio Cassar, another architect and engineer.

== Biography ==
Cassar's date of birth is not known, but he is believed to have been born in around 1520 in either Birgu or Gudja. The Cassar family, probably originating from Sicily, had been established in Malta since at least the year 1440. He had two brothers, named Andreas and Ians, and married his wife Mathia in the early 1560s after which they had five children -two boys, Vittorio and Gabriele; and three girls, Marietta, Battistina and Caterinella. Cassar had another child, Gio Domenico, from an extra-matrimonial relationship which he made sure to inherit none of his will and testament, ironically justifying himself by writing that his son was disobedient. Cassar was initially a capomastro (master builder), and he was a pupil of Evangelista Menga, the resident engineer of the Order of St. John. He worked as a military engineer during the Battle of Djerba in 1560 and the Great Siege of Malta in 1565. During the latter siege, he worked on repairing fortifications damaged by the Ottoman assaults, sometimes at great personal risk.

In 1566, the Order decided to construct a new capital city Valletta, and Cassar became the assistant of Francesco Laparelli, the Italian military engineer who had been sent to design the city's fortifications and grid plan. On 22 April 1569, Cassar was received within the Order in recognition of his merits as an architect and engineer. At this point, the Grand Master issued him a passport and Cassar spent the rest of the year touring Italian cities, including Naples, Rome and Lucca. He became familiar with the Mannerist style during this tour, and he employed this style in many of his later buildings.

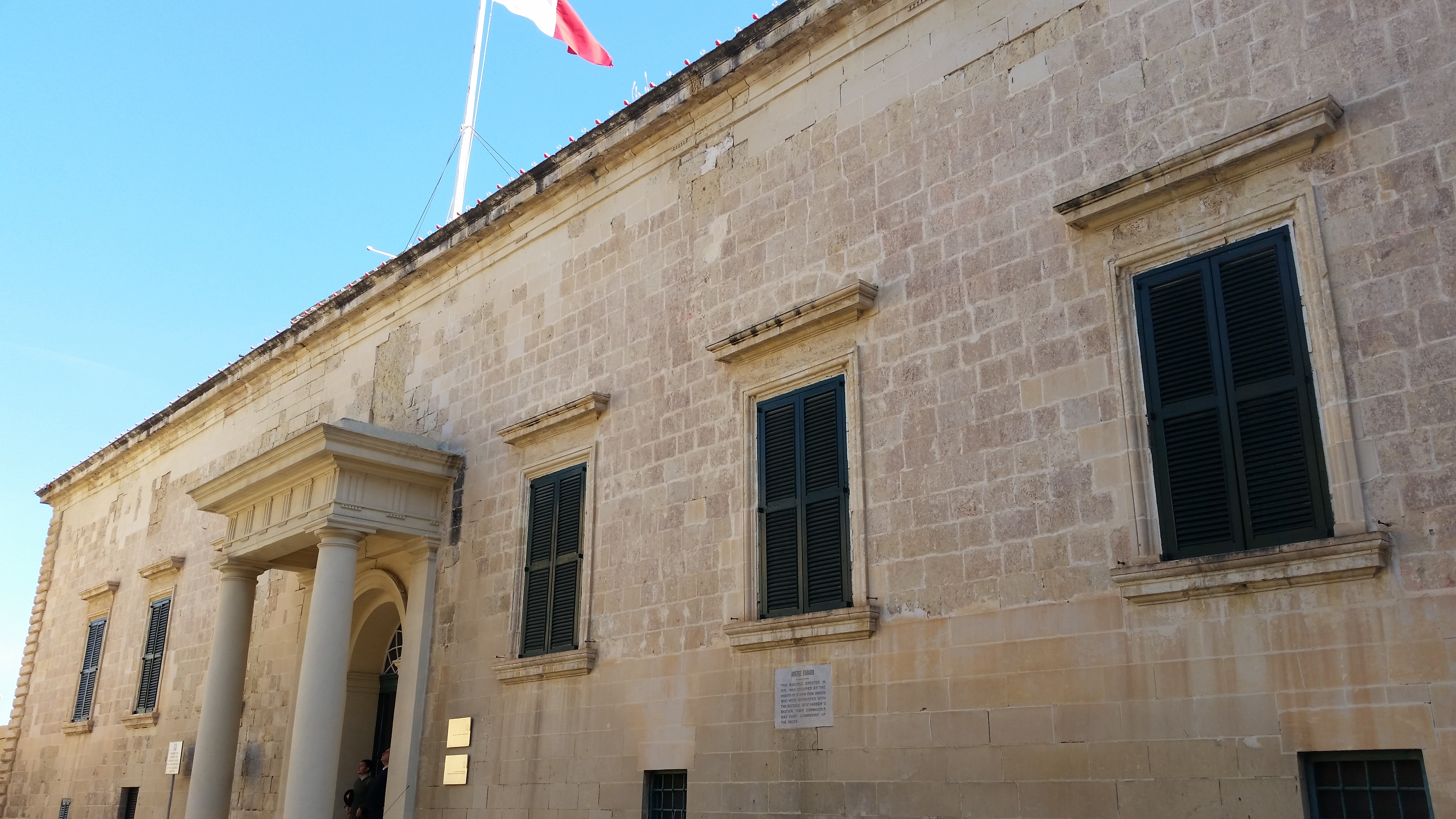
Auberge d'Aragon, the only auberge which still retains Cassar's original design, with the only addition being a 19th-century portico

Upon his return to Malta in around late 1569, work on the Valletta fortifications was almost completed, and he took over the project after Laparelli left the island. He also became the Order's resident architect and engineer. He designed many public, religious and private buildings within the city, including the Grandmaster's Palace, the seven original auberges and the Conventual Church of St. John (now known as St John's Co-Cathedral). Cassar also designed a few buildings outside the capital city, most notably the Verdala Palace in Buskett. The original design of the Sacra Infermeria is also attributed to him.

The date and circumstances of Cassar's death are not recorded. He made his second will on 9 January 1589. He is believed to have died in around 1592 in Valletta. He was buried in the Church of Porto Salvo in the same city.

== Buildings attributed to Cassar ==
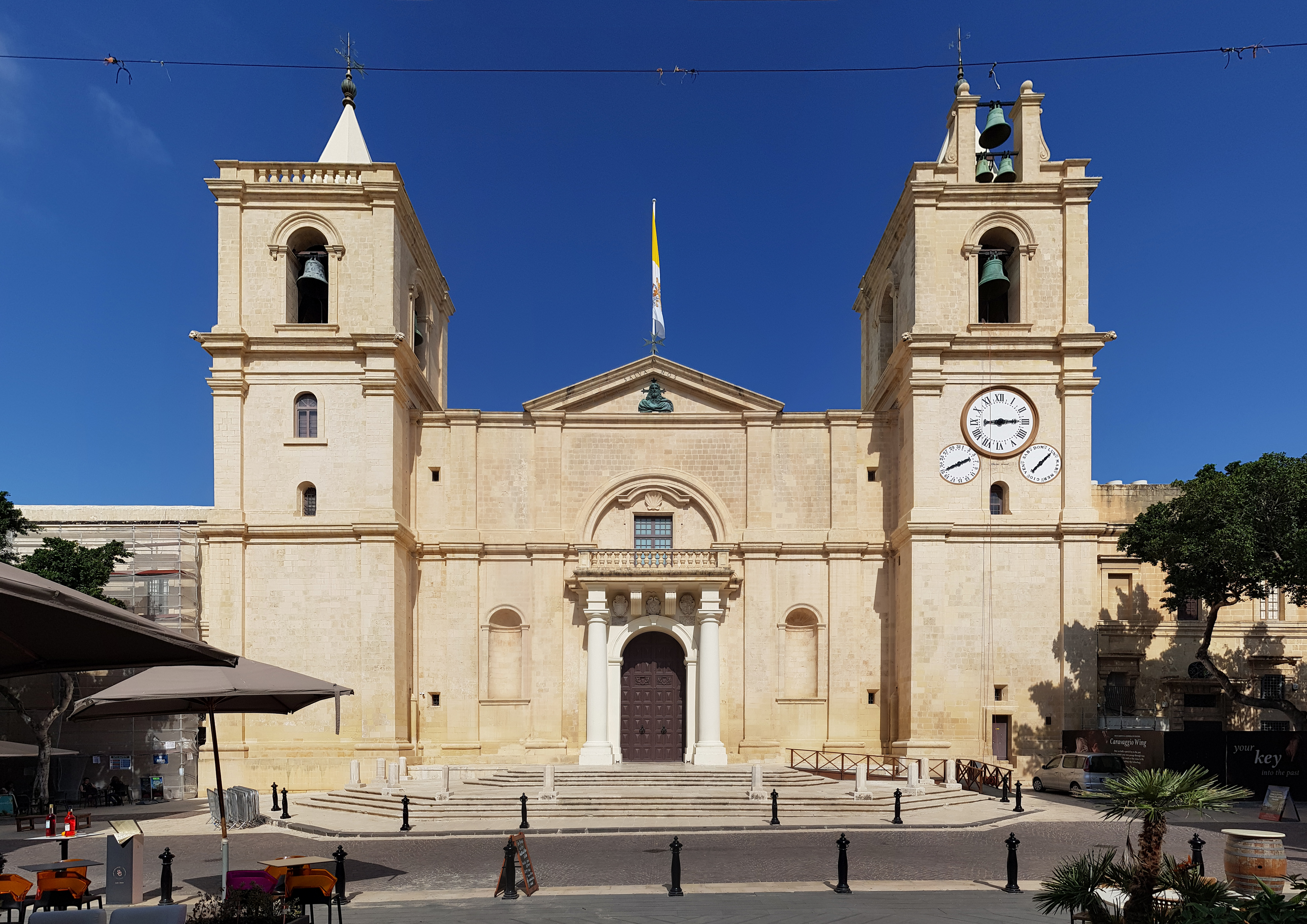
St John's Co-Cathedral

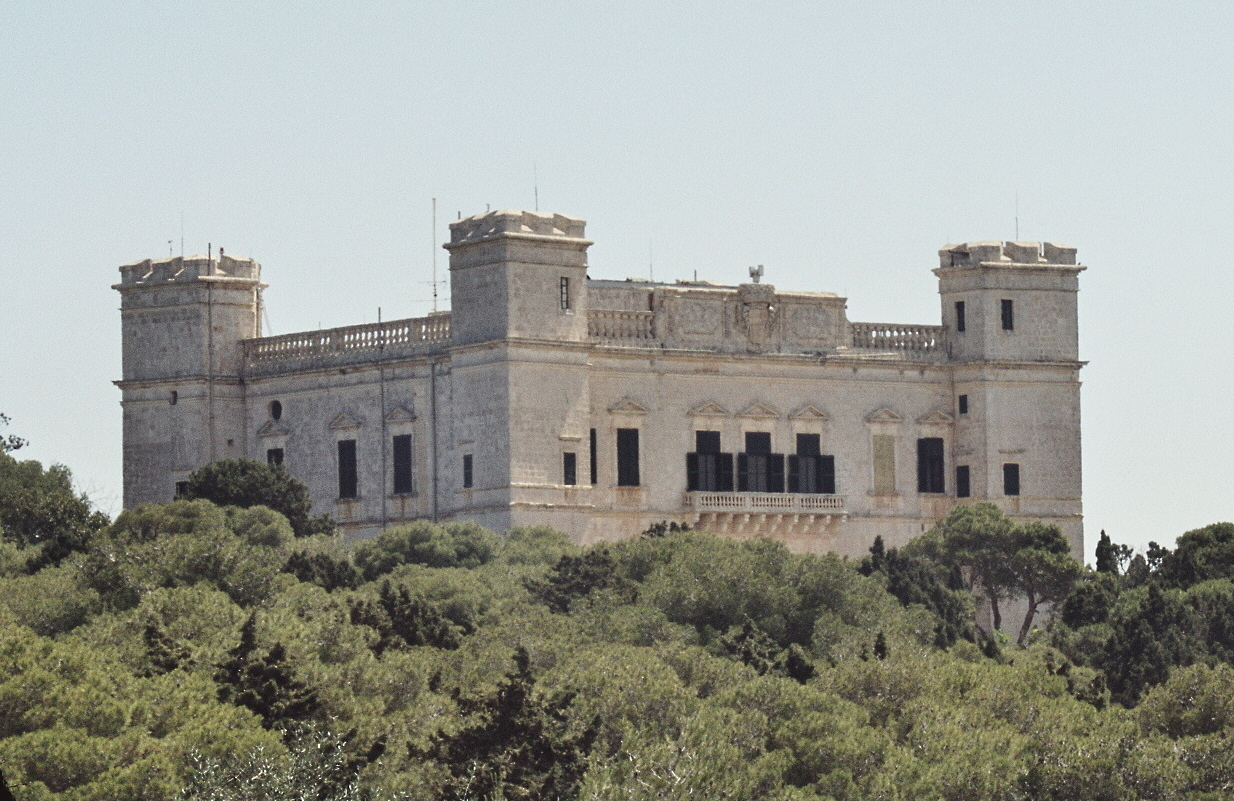
Verdala Palace

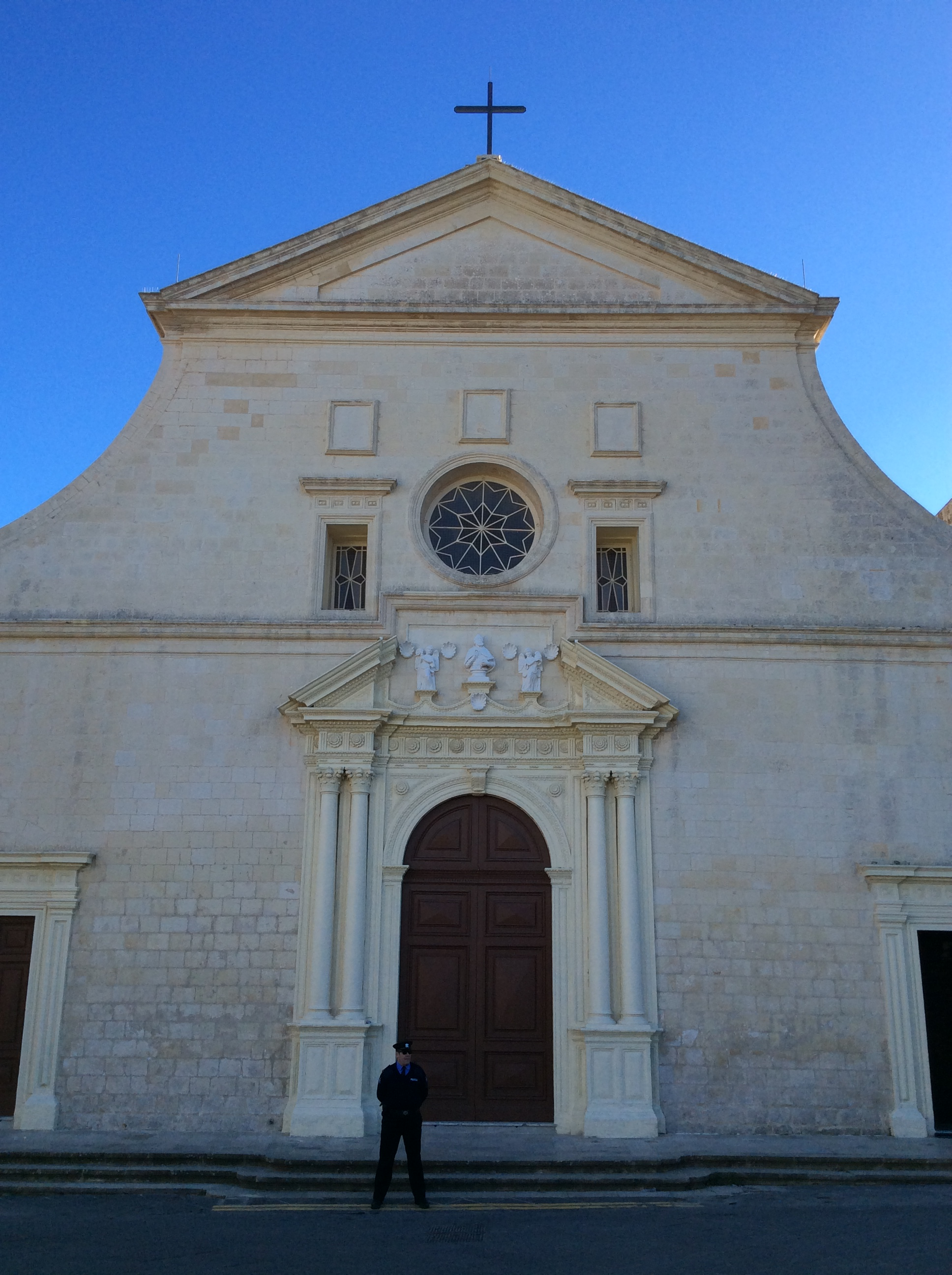
Church of St. Mark in Rabat

The following is a list of buildings which are known to have been designed by Girolamo Cassar or are attributed to him:

Valletta

- Fortifications of Valletta (1566 onwards; with Francesco Laparelli)
- Church of Our Lady of Victory (1566–67)
- House of Fra Eustachio del Monte (1569)
- First Auberge de France (c. 1570)
- Church of Our Lady of Mount Carmel (c. 1570)
- First Auberge d'Italie (1570–71)
- Auberge d'Aragon (1571)
- Auberge d'Allemagne (1571–75)
- Auberge d'Auvergne (c. 1571–83)
- Auberge de Provence (1571–75)
- Church of St. Dominic (1571)
- Church of St. Augustine (1571–96)
- Church of St. Mary of Jesus and adjoining convent (1571–75)
- St John's Co-Cathedral (1572–77)
- Auberge de Castille (1573–74)
- Second Auberge d'Italie (1574–79)
- Grandmaster's Palace (1574)
- Sacra Infermeria (1574)
- Church of St. Catherine of Italy (1576)
- Monastery of St. Catherine (1576)
- Carmelite convent (1576)
- Church of St. Paul's Shipwreck (1577–82)
- Forni della Signoria (c. 1584)
- Second Auberge de France (c. 1588)
- Del Soccorso Chapel in Fort Saint Elmo
- Windmills

Elsewhere in Malta

- Reconstruction of Birgu and Senglea (1560s)
- Church of St. Mark, Rabat (1571–88)
- Verdala Palace (1586)
- Old convent of St. Augustine, Rabat (1588)
- Old convent of St. Francis, Rabat (1588)
- Capuchin convent, Floriana (1586)

== Personal life ==
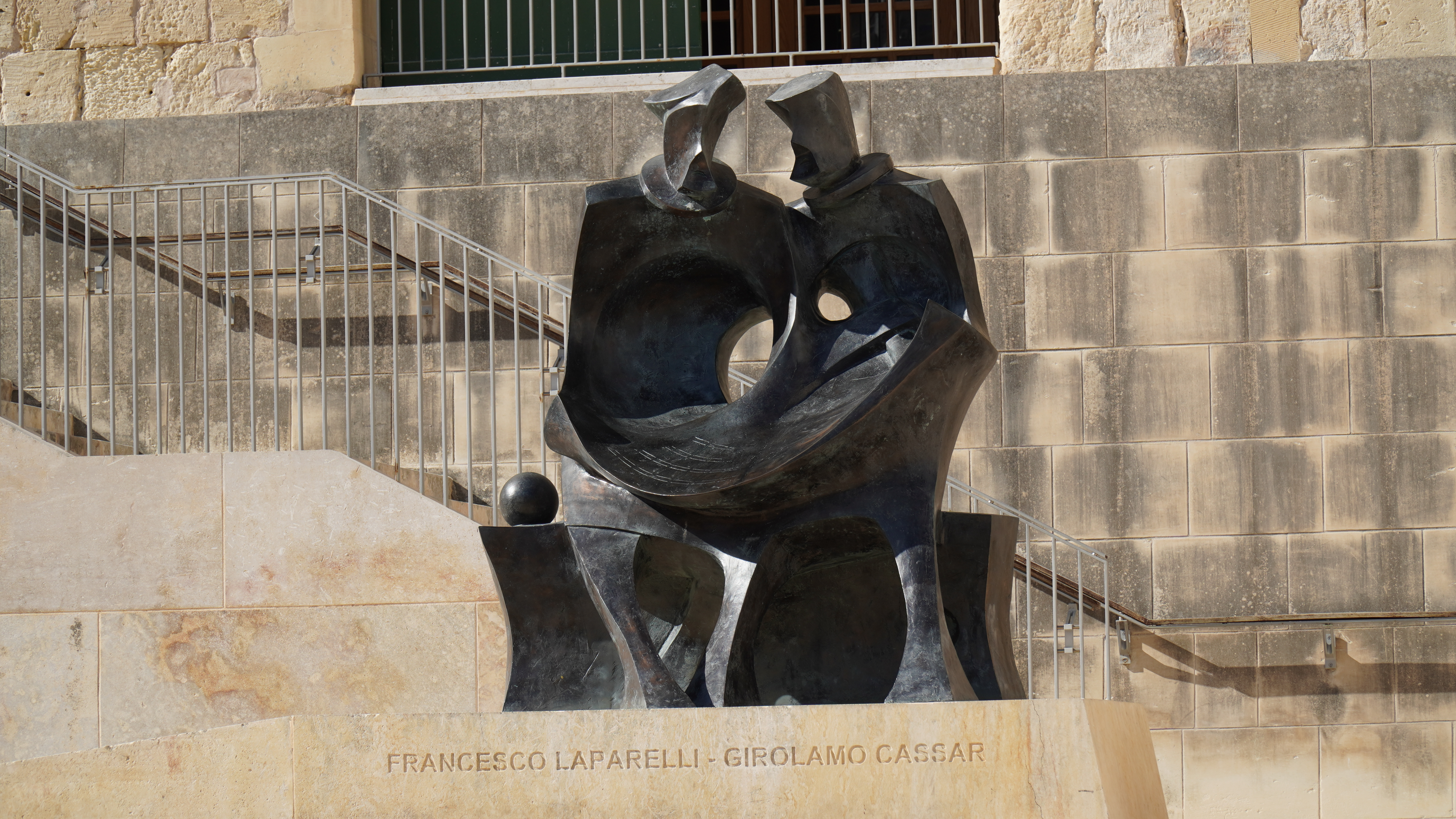
Monument to Francesco Laparelli and Girolamo Cassar, Valletta

Girolamo Cassar's first marriage was to Isabella de Torres; he later disowned her and claimed that their marriage was never consummated in a probable act of perjury. He later entered into a relationship with Matthia (or Mattea) Cassia, a woman from an impoverished branch of a noble family who had also been previously married and who had been prostituted as a teenager. Matthia became Cassar's concubine and later his wife; before and during their marriage they had five children together:

- Vittorio Cassar (c. 1550 – c. 1609), probably their firstborn son, the favourite and principal heir. He also became an architect, and succeeded his father as the Order's resident engineer.
- Gabriele Cassar (died 1640), who was also in the Order's service
- Marietitina Cassar, who married Natale Ricza
- Battistina Cassar, who married Antonio Habela
- Caterinella Cassar, who married Ambrogio Pace

The Cassar family was sufficiently wealthy, and they had at least two slaves. They lived in a house located between present-day St. Ursula and Melita Streets in Valletta.

Cassar also had another son, Gio Domenico, born out of wedlock.

== Legacy ==
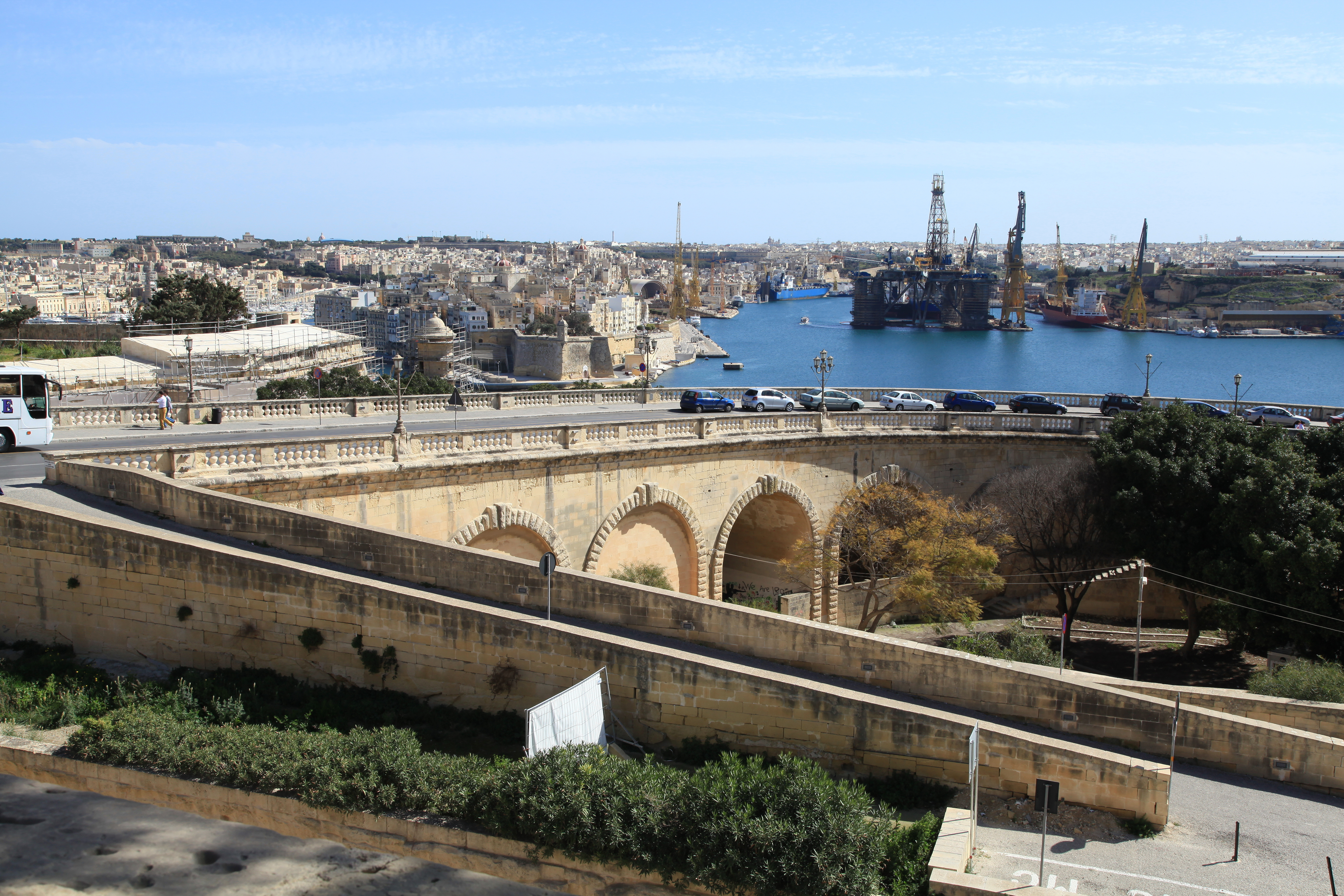
Girolamo Cassar Avenue

Many of Cassar's buildings were altered or demolished between the 17th and the 20th centuries, and very few buildings still retain his original design. The only auberge in Valletta retaining Cassar's façade is Auberge d'Aragon, with the only alteration being a portico which was added to the main doorway in the 19th century. Other buildings which retain Cassar's exterior design include St John's Co-Cathedral in Valletta and the Church of St. Mark in Rabat, although their interiors were altered over time.

After Malta's independence in 1964, the road leading from Floriana to Castille Square in Valletta was renamed from Duke of York Avenue to Girolamo Cassar Avenue (Maltese: Triq Girolamo Cassar) after the architect.
