= General Workers' Union (Malta) =

National trade union center in Malta

GWU
- General Workers' Union
- Founded: 1943
- Headquarters: Workers' Memorial Building, Valletta, Malta
- Location: Malta
- Members: 53,019
- Secretary General: Josef Bugeja
- Key people: Victor Carachi, President; Josef Bugeja, Secretary-General; Kevin Camilleri, deputy Secretary-General
- Affiliations: ITUC, ETUC
- Website: www.gwu.org.mt

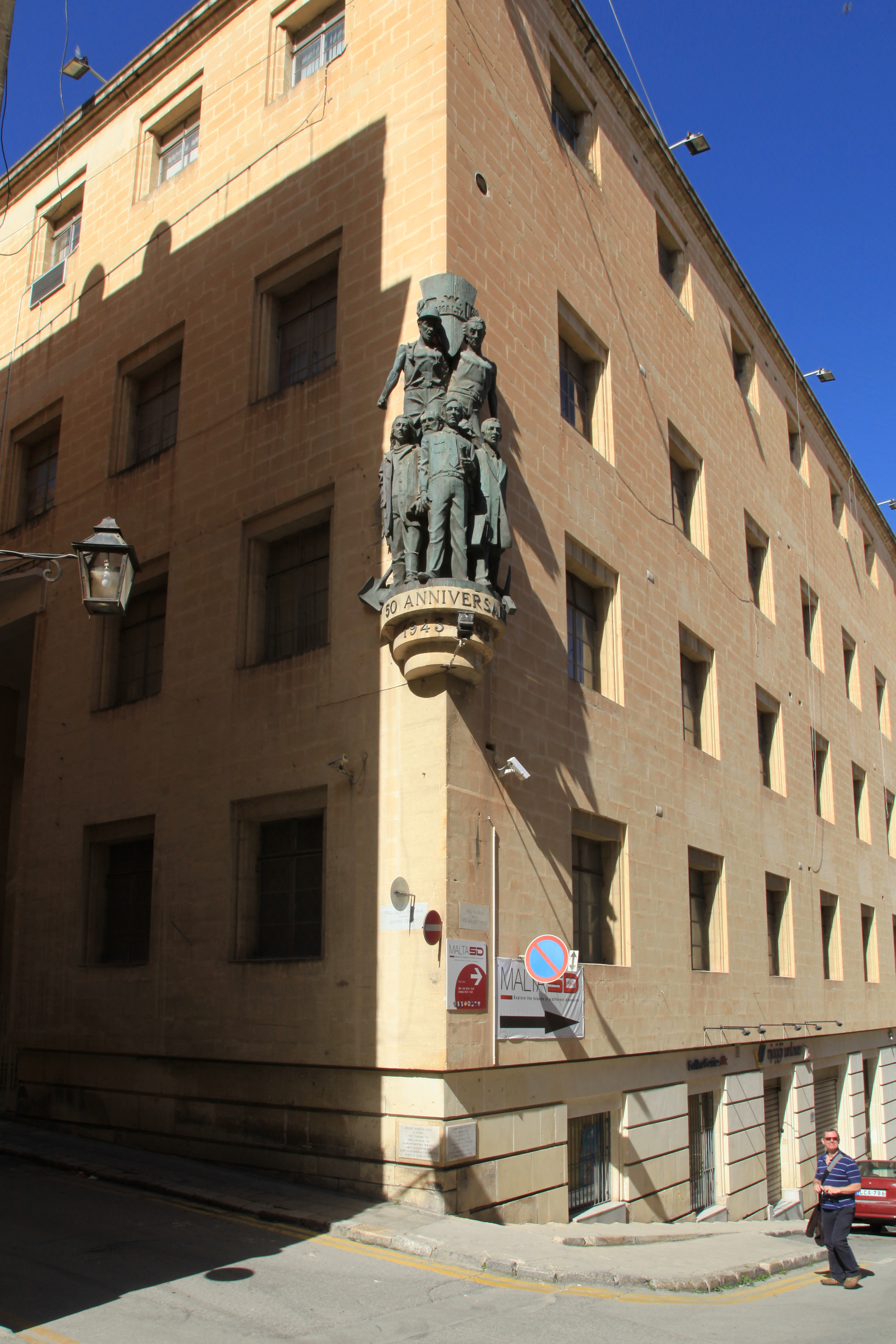
Workers' Memorial Building in Valletta (built on the site of Auberge de France)

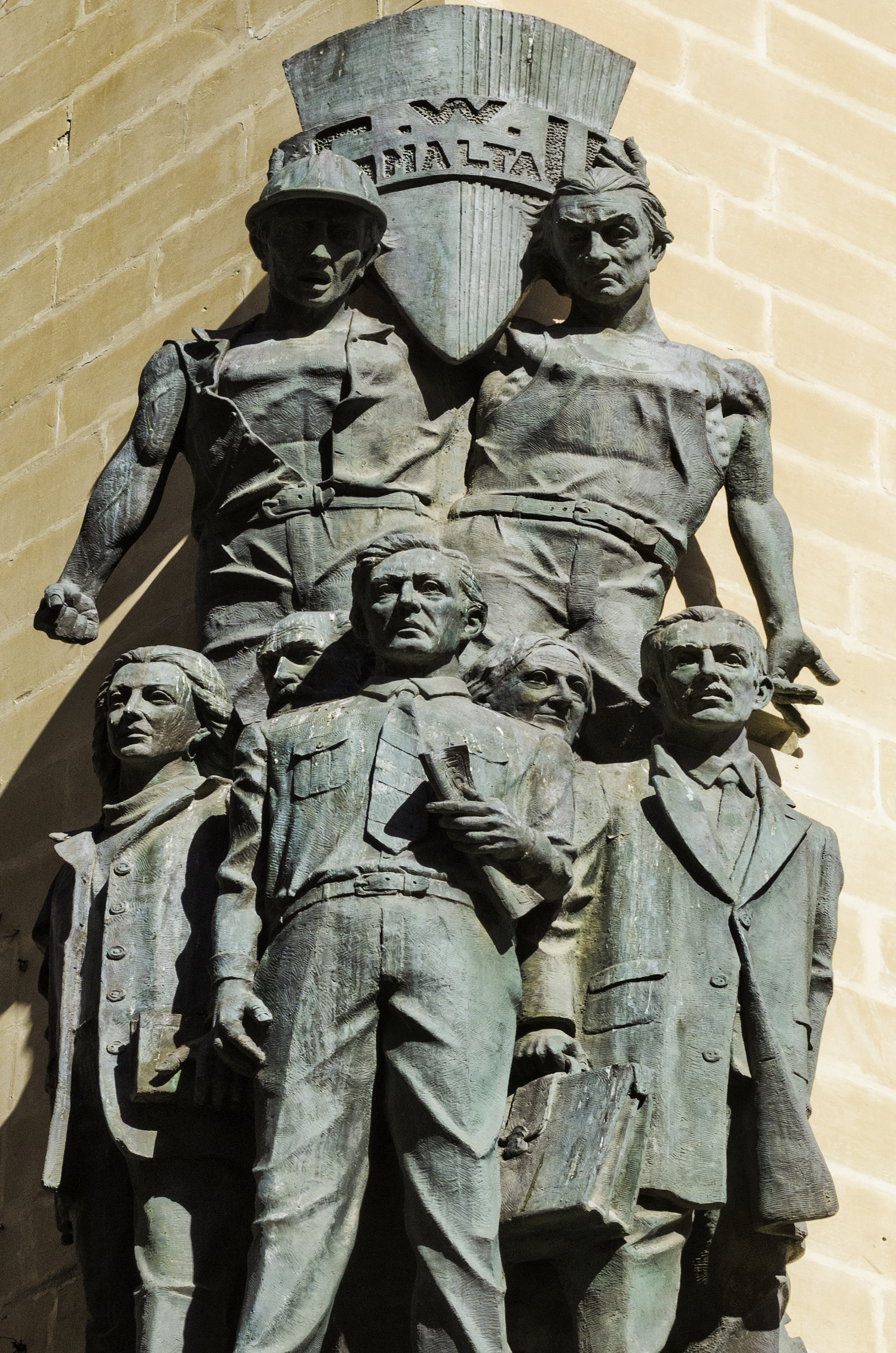
General Workers' Union Monument, Valletta

General Workers' Union (GWU) is the largest trade union centre in Malta, representing a broad cross-section of employees across multiple sectors. Established in 1943, the union has consistently advocated for better working conditions, social justice and economic progress for Maltese workers. It operates as a confederation composed of autonomous sections, each handling its industrial relations.

== History ==
The GWU was founded in 1943, during World War II, a time of considerable social and political transformation in Malta. From its inception, the union played a pivotal role in championing workers’ rights, securing better wages, and advocating for safe and fair employment conditions. Over the decades, it became a central force in Maltese labour history, contributing to national movements for political independence, economic reform, and workplace modernisation.

The GWU was founded amid the devastation of World War II, when Malta was a British colony. Malta’s geo-strategic position earned it the title of ‘island fortress’ for its role as a military base for the British Navy and Air Force.

The Second World War brought with it a relatively high level of employment, mainly in ship repair and other ancillary sectors directly linked to the needs of the Western military powers in the Mediterranean region. While this reality allowed Maltese workers to prosper in times of war, peacetime brought with it a rundown of industrial services for naval and military purposes. Such an odd and contrasting reality led most Maltese workers to mobilise and form a strong trade union to protect their jobs, improve their working and living conditions, and struggle for social justice.

Towards the end of 1942, Reggie Miller, a civilian clerk in the Drydocks, where the then-British Admiralty Dockyard was based, successfully convinced a small group of workers to set up a strong general union that would, in the future, leave its mark on the country’s recent history.

Reggie Miller’s impact was immediate, beginning to establish what was to become the General Workers’ Union, making him the GWU’s founding father. The first public meeting was held in March 1943, where an interim committee was appointed to draft the Union’s constitution – the Statute. The draft constitution was read out to workers in a mass activity held a few days later.

The public meeting served to appoint Reggie Miller as the GWU organising committee’s first Secretary, with acclamation. Many more public meetings and conferences around the island followed, some being held inside workplaces amid the hostility and antagonism of employers.

The first GWU members were initially enrolled on 1 July 1943. On 6 July 1943, the GWU organising committee combined its efforts with other organisations, mostly small groups created for benevolent purposes, to submit a memorandum to the British Government summarising many long-standing demands, including a claim for an adequate rise in workers’ wages and salaries.

In response to the intransigence of the shipyard authorities, which refused the GWU’s demands, the first unofficial strike took place on 24 August 1943.

In late September 1943, a wage increase was announced, albeit short of the original demands. The offer was immediately rejected by the GWU organising committee, leading to another strike on 28 September 1943. Workers were instructed to down tools, which was then followed by solidarity actions from other workers in several British defence establishments, but other unions on the island feared repercussions and retaliation from the British government. As a result, the GWU was alone in the industrial dispute with the British authorities.

With Britain still fiercely engaged in war during this time, the colonial authorities exerted an overweening influence on the English-language press in Malta, leading to spurious reports that accused Miller and the GWU committee members of being saboteurs and agitating workers to use violence.

The accusations failed to prevent the GWU from being formally and officially founded on Tuesday, 5 October 1943.

== Development ==
Throughout its history, the General Workers’ Union has adapted to changes in Malta’s economy, from the British colonial period through independence and into the European Union era.

Immediately after its founding in 1943, the GWU began a nationwide campaign to introduce laws on trade union rights and freedoms, including a mechanism to resolve industrial unrest wherever and whenever it arises. An important and historic piece of legislation, introduced at the repeated insistence of the GWU, was the Conditions of Employment Act (CERA) of 1952.

Years later, the GWU also lobbied the Maltese Parliament to pass the Industrial Relations Act (IRA) in 1976, which ensured that no worker would be penalised for taking industrial action. This law was enacted against a background in which the government of the day could have imprisoned striking workers.

Since its founding, the GWU has not only encouraged trade unionism, but it successfully carried out its work and mission to improve workers’ quality of life and guarantee a fair future for them. The alliance between workers and the GWU has led to the achievement of economic and social progress in all areas of work.

The GWU has maintained a significant role in collective bargaining, employment legislation, and the promotion of social welfare policies. It has also taken an active part in European labour structures and is one of two Maltese union centres recognised by the European Trade Union Confederation (ETUC), also representing Maltese employees at the International Labour Organization (ILO).

== Structure ==
The GWU is organised as a confederation of eight autonomous sections, each responsible for representing specific sectors of the economy. These are:

- Government, Public Entities and Health
- Professional, Financial and Services
- Chemicals and Energy
- Food and Hospitality
- Maritime and Aviation
- Metal and Construction
- Technology, Electronics and Communication
- Disciplinary Corps, Security and Law Enforcement Officials

Each section handles its industrial negotiations, disputes, and agreements while operating under the broader principles of the union.

In addition to its Valletta headquarters, the GWU maintains a local representative in Gozo to support workers across Malta’s islands.

The GWU’s commitment to social solidarity extends to youth engagement and pensioner representation. Through its Youth Section and the Pensioners’ Association, it ensures a continuous dialogue between generations within the union’s structure.

== Media and Publications ==
The GWU operates a media arm through Union Print Co. Ltd., which publishes two Maltese-language newspapers:

- It-Torċa
- L-Orizzont

These publications provide news coverage with a focus on workers’ rights, economic issues and union activities. The GWU also operates a digital news platform – talk.mt, offering online coverage and opinion.

== Youth Engagement ==
The GWU Youths Section is dedicated to promoting the interests and participation of young workers. It is affiliated with several local and international youth organisations, including:

- Kunsill Nazzjonali għaż-Żgħażagħ (KNŻ)
- UNI Youths
- ETUC Youths
- ICFTU Youths

The youth section ensures that younger generations of workers are actively involved in shaping the future of the union and Maltese labour policy.

== International Affiliations ==
The General Workers’ Union maintains active participation in several European and international labour organisations through its International Secretary, helping shape policy and cooperation across borders.

== See also ==
- European Trade Union Confederation
- International Labour Organization
- List of trade unions

== Notes ==
- ICTUR; et al., eds. (2005). Trade Unions of the World (6th ed.). London, UK: John Harper Publishing. ISBN 0-9543811-5-7.
