= Auberge d'Allemagne =

Bakeries of Malta

- Berġa ta' Alemanja
- Laying of the foundation stone of St Paul's Pro-Cathedral on 20 May 1839, with the remains of the auberge in the background
- Interactive map of the Auberge d'Allemagne area

General information
- Status: Destroyed
- Type: Auberge
- Architectural style: Mannerist
- Location: Valletta, Malta
- Coordinates: 35°54′2″N 14°30′43″E
- Construction started: 1571
- Completed: 1575
- Demolished: 1839

Technical details
- Material: Limestone

Design and construction
- Architect: Girolamo Cassar

Auberge d'Allemagne (Maltese: Berġa ta' Alemanja) was an auberge in Valletta, Malta. It was built between 1571 and 1575 to house knights of the Order of Saint John from the langue of Germany.

It was vacated in 1798 when the Order was expelled during the French occupation of Malta. By the 1830s, the building was used as the residence of the Chief Justice. Another part was used by the Mediterranean Fleet as a bakery and a mill.

It was demolished in 1839 to make way for St Paul's Pro-Cathedral. Auberge d'Allemagne was the only auberge in Malta to be intentionally demolished, as the others were destroyed due to damage sustained during World War II. Some remains may still exist in situ.

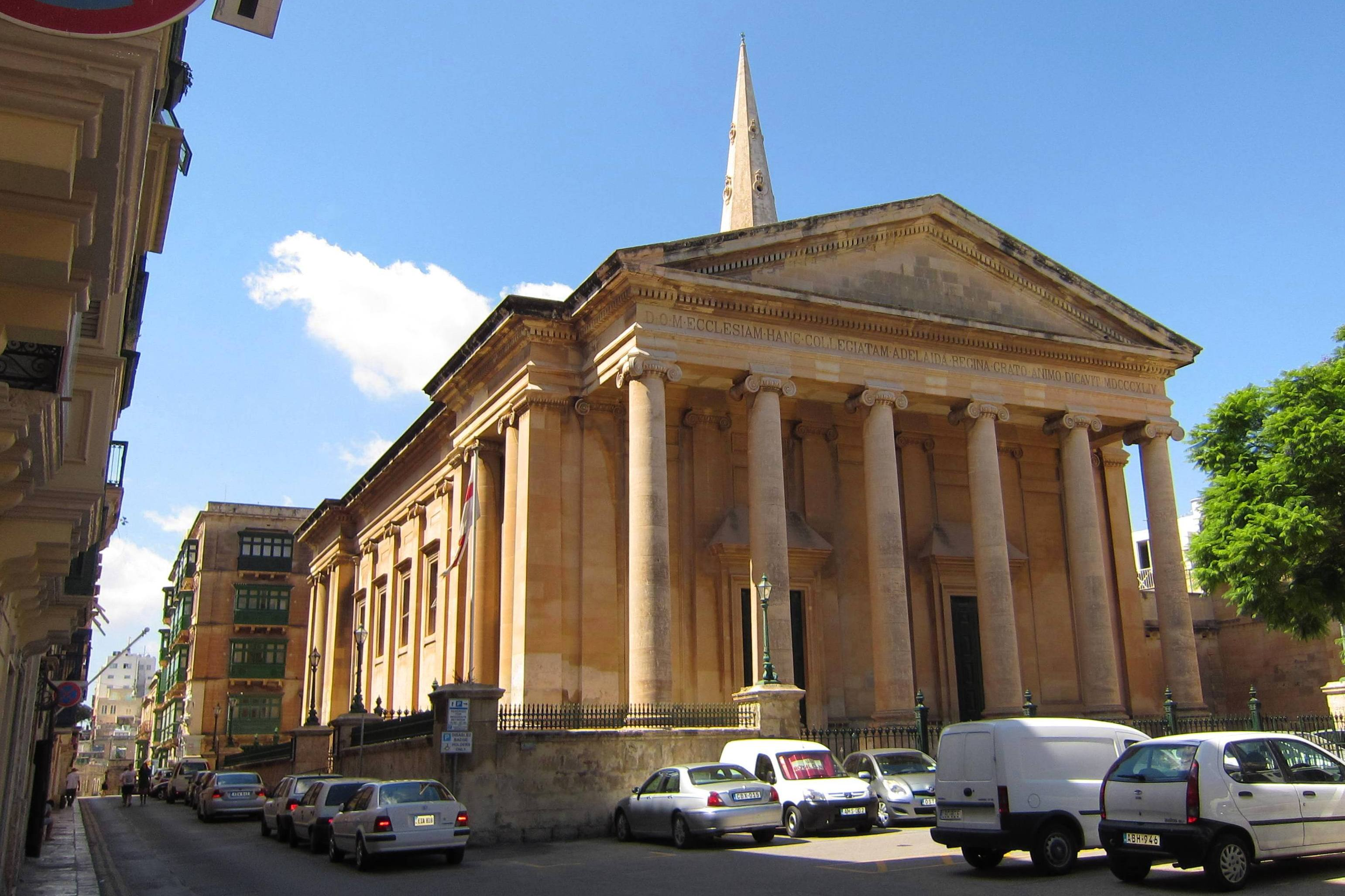
The site of the auberge is now occupied by St Paul's Pro-Cathedral

The auberge was designed by the Maltese architect Girolamo Cassar, but almost nothing is known about the structure.
