= Alberto Magri =

Maltese Judge, Lawyer and Philanthropist

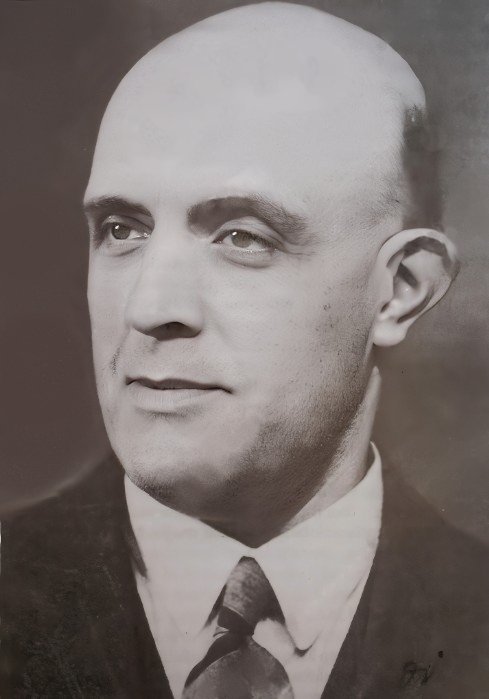
- A 1950s portrait of Alberto Magri

Judiciary of Malta
- In office 1952–1961

Personal details
- Born: 29 April 1896 Valletta, British Malta
- Died: 1 February 1972 (aged 75) Attard, Malta
- Resting place: Addolorata Cemetery, Paola
- Citizenship: Maltese
- Education: University of Malta

Alberto Magri (29 April 1896 – 1 February 1972) was a Maltese judge, lawyer, politician, and philanthropist. He practiced as both a criminal lawyer and a civil lawyer and was active in public life as a member of the legislative assembly during Malta's first period of self-government.

== Legal career ==
Magri earned his Doctor of Laws (LLD) from the Royal University of Malta (later the University of Malta) in 1919 and practiced as a lawyer in Malta. During his career, he worked on both criminal and civil cases, gaining recognition for his legal expertise. Sources note that his work earned him respect among peers in Malta's legal community particularly in high-profile criminal cases. Notably, he defended 17 capital cases, the most significant being the 1942 treason trial of Carmelo Borg Pisani during World War II. That year he also challenged the deportation of Maltese citizens to Uganda, among them Chief Justice Sir Arturo Mercieca, Herbert Ganado, Enrico Mizzi, Vincenzo Bonello, and Mgr Alberto Pantalleresco, the deportations were carried out on 13 February 1942 and, in May of that year, the Court of Appeal ruled that no Colonial legislature could order the deportation of British Subjects from Malta, the deportees did remain in Uganda until March 1945.

In 1942, Magri defended one of the Zammit brothers, who were charged with the murder of Spiru Grech. Despite Magri's strong defence of the elder brother Guzeppi Zammit, the brothers’ mutual accusations sealed their fate. A five-judge court swiftly convicted them, sentencing both to hang, marking Malta's last executions. Subsequent death sentences were commuted, and Capital punishment in Malta was fully abolished in 2000.

After the war, Magri handled three major trials in which the accused were ultimately acquitted and released. His legal expertise earned him long-standing recognition, and he served as Vice President of the Chamber of Advocates for many years.

In 1952, he was appointed as a judge in Malta's judiciary, a position he held until retiring in 1961. According to historical records, his judicial rulings emphasised adherence to legal principles, and he presided over cases until his retirement after a legal career spanning over four decades.

== Political career ==
Magri's political involvement began in 1921 when lawyer Enrico Mizzi founded the Democratic Nationalist Party (Malta, 1921–1926) (Partit Demokratiku Nazzjonalista). At the time, Magri was gaining prominence as a skilled criminal defense lawyer, prompting Mizzi to invite him to join the party. He was appointed General Secretary of the party and later contested the 1924 Maltese general election in the Second District, which included Sliema.

Magri secured 524 votes, winning a seat in the Legislative Assembly (Assemblea Leġiżlattiva) during the first period of self-government. In a June 1924 general meeting, the Secretary proposed a vote of congratulations (voto di congratulazione) in his honour, which was unanimously acclaimed by the members present.

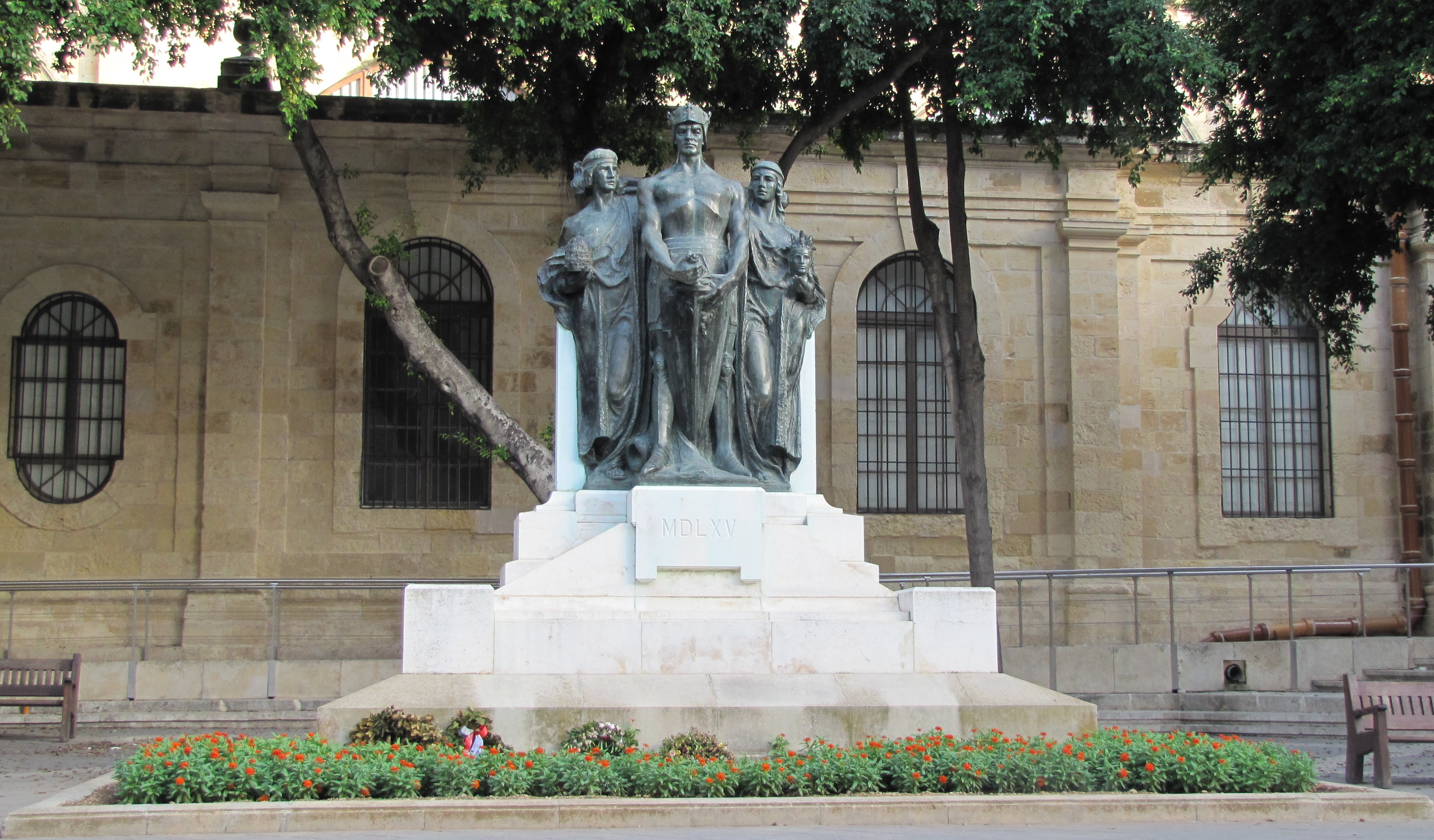
Great Siege Monument - Valletta

In the legislature, Magri proposed a national memorial to the Great Siege. He put the proposal of the Great Siege Monument to the House of Representatives by Private Member's Bill, arguing in a speech for the placement of a monument and the renaming of the square to Piazza Otto Settembre, urging all parties to support it in the national interest. On 22 January 1925, the Speaker, Salvatore Borg Olivier, put the motion to a vote. It was carried with near-unanimous support, the Nationalists under Sir Ugo Mifsud, the Constitutionals under Gerald Strickland and Enrico Mizzi's Democratic Nationalists voted in favour, while the Labour members voted unanimously against.

The monument was sculpted by Antonio Sciortino in 1926, while he was working and living in Rome. It was inaugurated in Valletta on 8 May 2027. Chief Justice Sir Arturo Mercieca and poet, politician, and philosopher Anastasio Cuschieri addressed the crowds in Italian and Maltese.

His political career lasted until the 1927 Maltese general election, as he did not contest it.

== Philanthropy ==
Magri was involved in philanthropic efforts, including serving as chairman of the Valletta branch of the Society of St. Vincent de Paul, a charity active in Malta since 1850. This organisation, focuses on assisting those in need through various charitable initiatives.

Elected as the second president of the Stella Maris Philharmonic Society on 1 November 1923, following the resignation of Notary Giovanni Gabaretta. Re-elected several times, he oversaw the society's move to its present premises in February 1924, supported the purchase of band uniforms, and was made Honourary President for life in August 1925.

After retiring at the age of 65, he became the first President of the Azzjoni Kattolika (Catholic Action) in Malta on 11 October 1931, served until 1936, when Herbert Ganado succeeded him. This is a prominent Roman Catholic organisation in Malta dedicated to fostering spiritual, social, and personal development among its members.

Upon retiring from the judiciary in 1961, Magri intensified his commitment to supporting the underprivileged. Historical accounts describe him renting space beneath the Church of Our Lady of Damascus, Valletta, where he offered legal advice twice weekly until his death. Sources indicate that this service provided written and oral guidance to clients across Malta.

== Death and legacy ==
Alberto Magri died on 1 February 1972, at Santa Caterina Hospital, Attard, Malta, at the age of 75. After retiring from the judiciary, in 1961, he remained active in public life and voluntarily gave free legal advice to those in need. In the legislature, his 1925 proposal for a national memorial to the Great Siege, led to the monument's inauguration in 1927. In 1942 he challenged the deportation of Maltese citizens to Uganda, a case in which the Court of Appeal held the deportations unlawful. His legal career spanned over four decades in which he served as lead counsel in 17 capital cases, he also held various notable appointments throughout his life.
