= Silvio Mangion =

Maltese serial killer

- Born: Salvatore Mangion; 1965 (age 60–61); Żejtun, Malta
- Other name: "Kalang"
- Conviction: Murder (3 counts)
- Penalty: Life imprisonment plus 21 years

Details
- Victims: 3
- Span of crimes: 1984–1998
- Country: Malta
- States: South Eastern, Southern
- Imprisoned at: Corradino prison

Salvatore "Silvio" Mangion (born 1965) is the only known Maltese serial killer. He was convicted of killing three elderly pensioners during robberies between 1984 and 1996, receiving life imprisonment for his crimes. He is currently incarcerated at Corradino prison.

== Murders ==
A native of Żejtun, Mangion, also known by his alias "Kalang", was an unemployed schizophrenic who had depressive episodes. He was also addicted to alcohol and prescription medication. At the time of the murders, however, it was determined that he was fully aware of his actions and did them of his own volition, the motive always being robbery.

=== Rozina Zammit ===
On February 8, 1984, the body of the 54-year-old was found on the doorsteps of her home in Safi. Zammit had sustained 37 stab wounds to her neck, chest, and abdomen. The motive appeared to be robbery, as a small sum of £M 200 was found to be stolen from her home.

Mangion confessed to stalking the woman to her home on the day of the murder and knocking on her front door. When Zammit opened, Mangion attacked her and she began shouting. He stabbed her and went to get the money, but, realizing that she had died from her injuries, fled the scene.

=== Maria Stella Magrin ===
On October 30, 1986, 68-year-old Magrin, who lived only a few doors down from former President Ugo Mifsud Bonnici in Cospicua, heard a knock on her door and opened without asking who it was. Three men, Mangion and uncle-nephew duo Leli and Oswaldo Spiteri, entered the house and demanded that she give them all her money. Magrin guided them through the house with a torchlight, as there was no electricity, and handed them a sum of money (worth around 15,000 euros at 2012 values). Magrin was then stabbed 13 times by Mangion, to prevent identification, as none of the criminals had worn masks before all of them left. She later died from her injuries.

=== Francesco "Frenc" Cassar ===
On August 16, 1998, Mangion decided to rob his neighbours: 71-year-old Giuseppa and 75-year-old Francesco "Frenc" Savario Cassar. After he swallowed some pills and drank some alcohol to pluck up courage, he rang the Cassars' doorbell, surprising Giuseppa with a knife when she opened the door. He stabbed her in the stomach and right arm, but she managed to fight back, calling upon her brother for help. Mangion saw Francesco and lunged at him, fatally stabbing him in the chest. Seeing Cassar lying bleeding on the ground and his T-shirt covered in blood frightened him, so he fled, disposing of his knife and T-shirt in a reservoir at President Anton Buttigieg Street.

== Trial, imprisonment and confessions ==
Sometime after the Cassar murder, Mangion was arrested and soon indicted. During a November 26, 2002 hearing, jurors determined that he was sane at the time of the murder, and on January 5, 2004, at the beginning of his jury trial, he pleaded guilty. Mangion was given a 21-year sentence for killing Frenc and attempting to kill Giuseppa.

The other murders remained a mystery until a year after Mangion's conviction when he implicated himself as the one responsible to several inmates at Corradino prison, one of them being Steven Spiteri. Steven later reported those claims to the police, and Mangion was questioned on their validity, to which he confessed. He also implicated the Spiteris, but, by then, Leli had already died in 2000 and Oswaldo had committed suicide, hanging himself while in custody. Mangion was asked to walk the investigators through the crime scene, explaining the layout accurately. At some point during the trial proceedings, one inspector inquired about two peculiar tattoos Mangion had on each ear: one had the letter 'S', while the other had a 'K'. In response, the murderer joked that it stood for 'serial killer'. On June 23, 2010, Silvio Mangion was sentenced to life imprisonment for the murder of Rozina Zammit, and was given another life sentence for the murder of Maria Magrin at a later date.
