= Corradino prison =

Prison in Paola, Malta

Corradino Prison
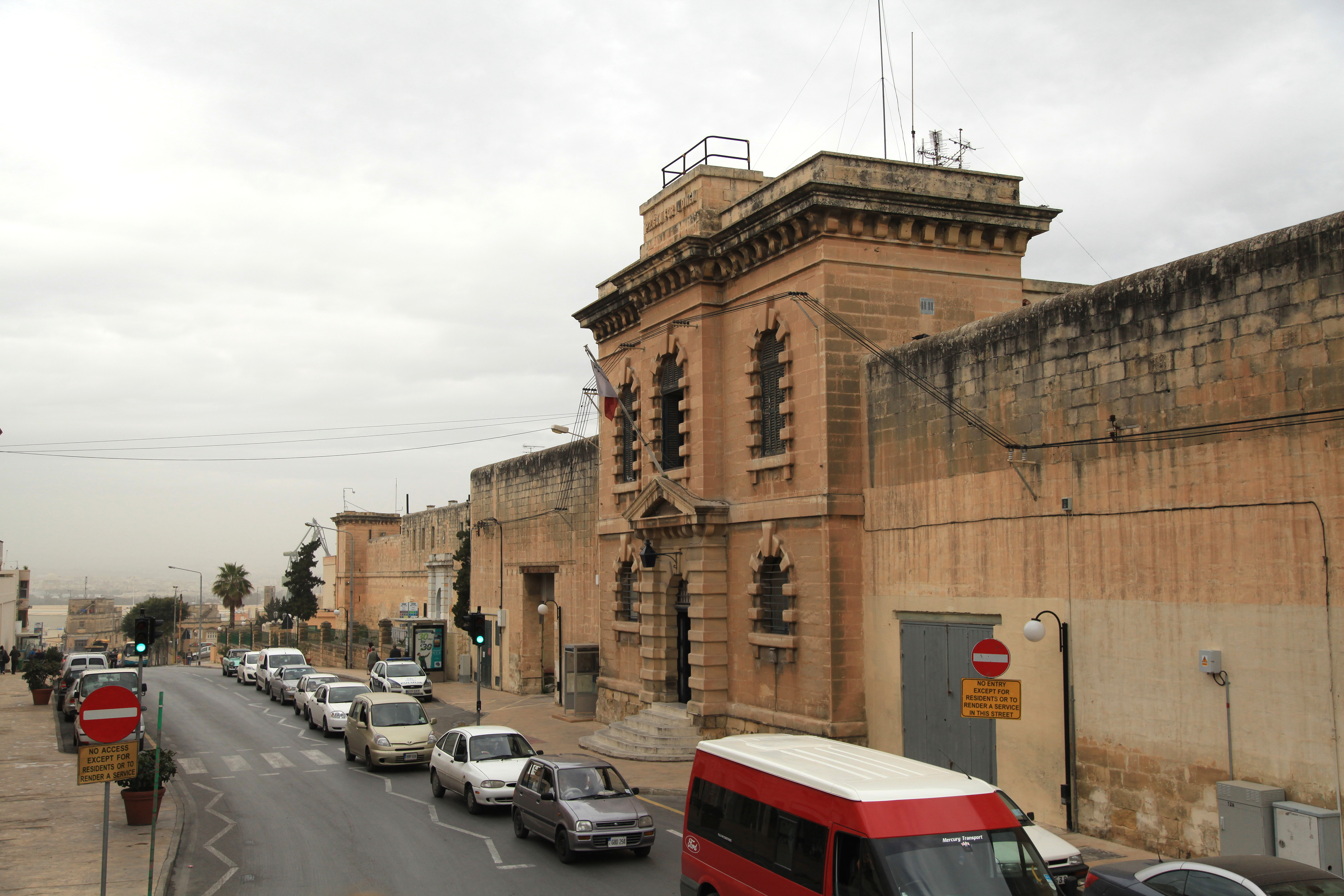
- Interactive map of the Corradino Prison area

General information
- Location: Paola
- Coordinates: 35°52′26″N 14°30′22″E
- Inaugurated: 1842
- Owner: Government of Malta

Design and construction
- Architect: W. Lamb Arrowsmith
- Engineer: Royal Engineers

The Corradino prison, officially known as the Corradino Correctional Facility (Maltese: Faċilità Korrettiva ta' Kordin) is a prison located in Paola, Malta. It is Malta’s largest and main correctional facility; hosting different sections for males, females, and children. The prison takes its name from the hill of Corradino, named after Conradin of Swabia, king of Sicily who in the 13th century also dominated the Maltese archipelago. It is located 5 km from the capital Valletta and currently houses 700 inmates as of 2023, with half awaiting trial. The facility is also a Grade 1 scheduled asset near significant heritage sites, such as the Corradino Lines and Kordin III Temple.

== History ==
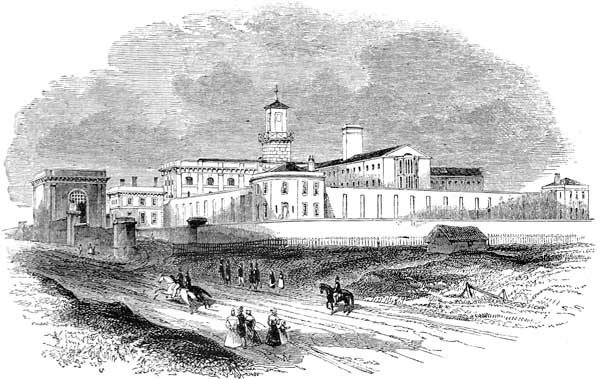
Pentonville prison in London, built in 1842 with a similar plan used for Corradino Prison.

The prison of Corradino was built by the British colonial authorities starting from 1842 based on plans by W. Lamb Arrowsmith on the model of the Pentonville prison in London, with a capacity of 200 prisoners divided into 4 wings. On November 28, 1942, the irredentist Carmelo Borg Pisani was executed by hanging in the prison for treason and conspiracy against His Majesty's government.

== Conditions and inmates ==
In 1995 the association of prisoners Mid-Dlam ghad-Dawl ("From darkness to light") was established to improve living conditions inside the prison, the association is affiliated with the Action for Prisoners' Families of England and Wales (APF) and the European Group of Prisoners' Abroad (EGPA) and is also part of the Association of Prison Volunteers. In 1999 the juvenile wing was built with 36 cells Since 2005, the prison hosts the only Maltese serial killer, Silvio Mangion, who was sentenced to life imprisonment in 2010. On 28 January 2006 the prison was visited by the new bishop of Gozo Mario Grech. In 2011 there were 593 prisoners out of 444 places available and they were divided as follows: 384 prisoners already convicted (including 24 women); 209 prisoners awaiting trial (including 15 women); and 34 underage boys (16-22).

In 2011 the percentage of juvenile detainees (6.1%) was the highest among those in the countries belonging to the European Union. In 2014, 205 people worked in the prison including 18 policemen from the Malta Police Force.

== See also ==
- Paola
