= Upper Barrakka Gardens =

Public garden in Valletta, Malta

- Il-Barrakka ta' Fuq
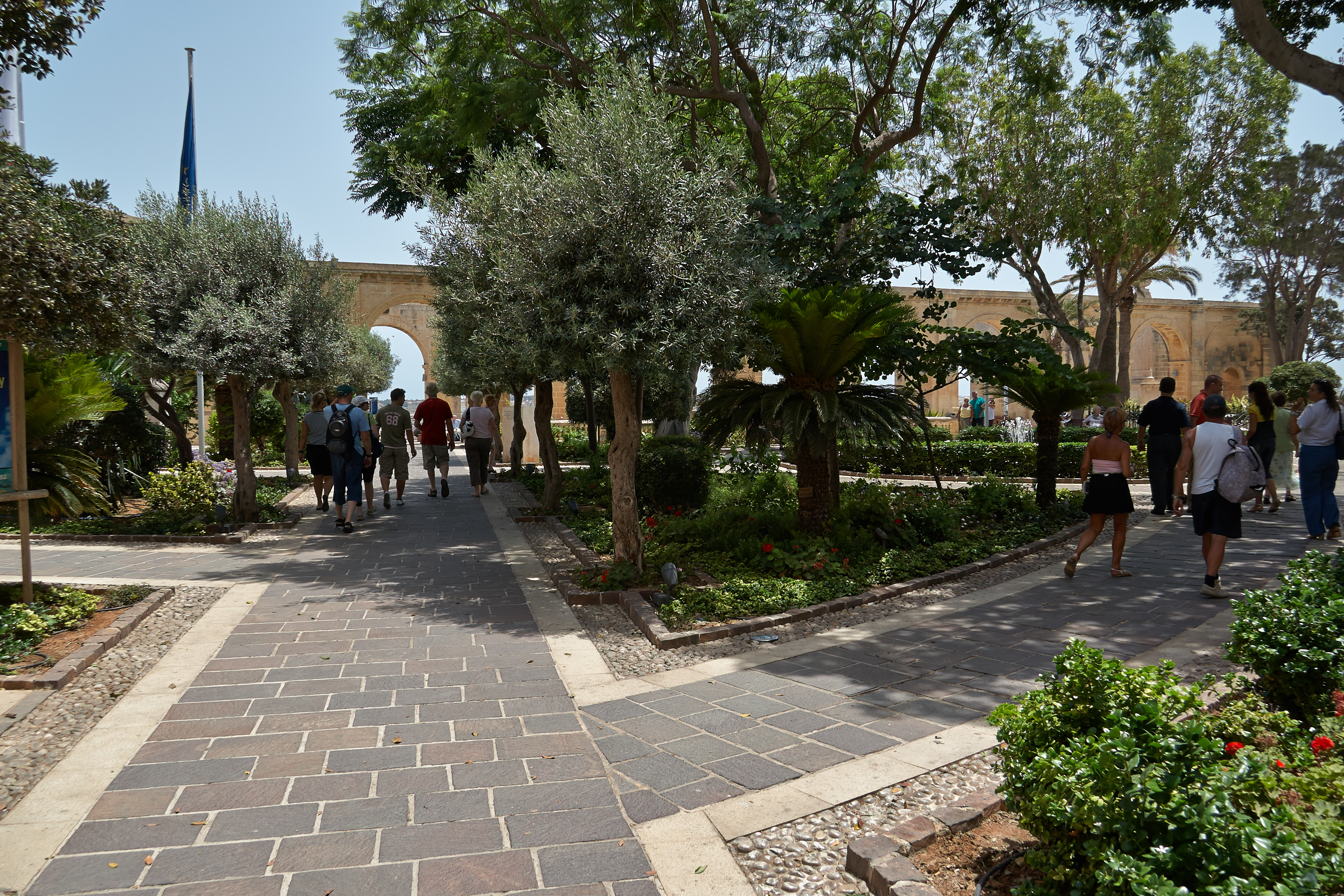
- View of the Upper Barrakka Gardens

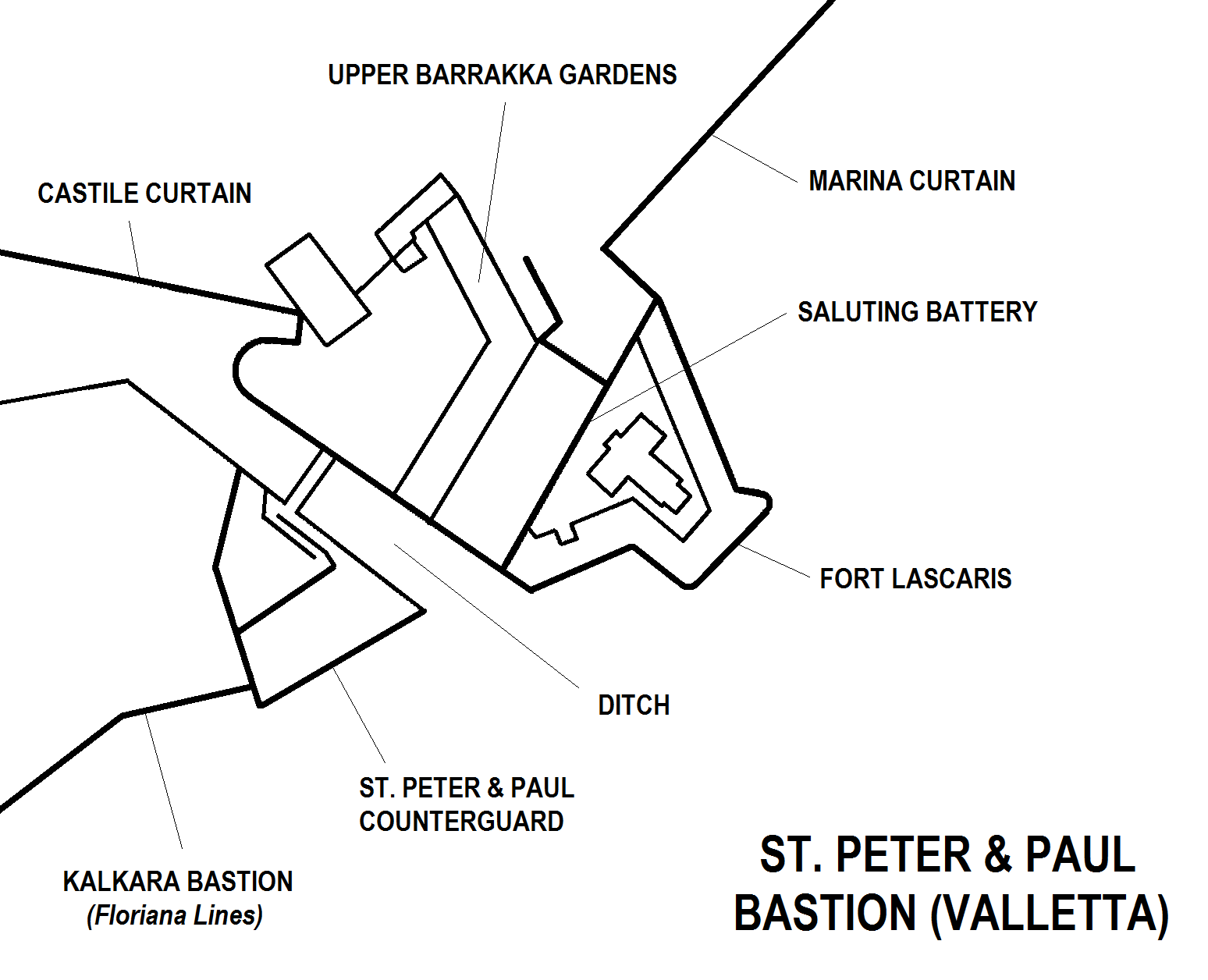
- Map of the Upper Barrakka Gardens within St. Peter & Paul Bastion
- Location: Valletta, Malta
- Coordinates: 35°53′41″N 14°30′44″E
- Area: Valletta harbour
- Created: 1661
- Open: 10:00-22:00

The Upper Barrakka Gardens (Maltese: Il-Barrakka ta' Fuq) are a public garden in Valletta, Malta. Along with the Lower Barrakka Gardens in the same city, they offer a panoramic view of the Grand Harbour.

The gardens are located on the upper tier of Saints Peter and Paul Bastion, which was built in the 1560s. The bastion's lower tier contains the Saluting Battery. The garden's terraced arches were built in 1661 by the Italian knight Fra Flaminio Balbiani. They were originally roofed, but the ceiling was removed following the Rising of the Priests in 1775.

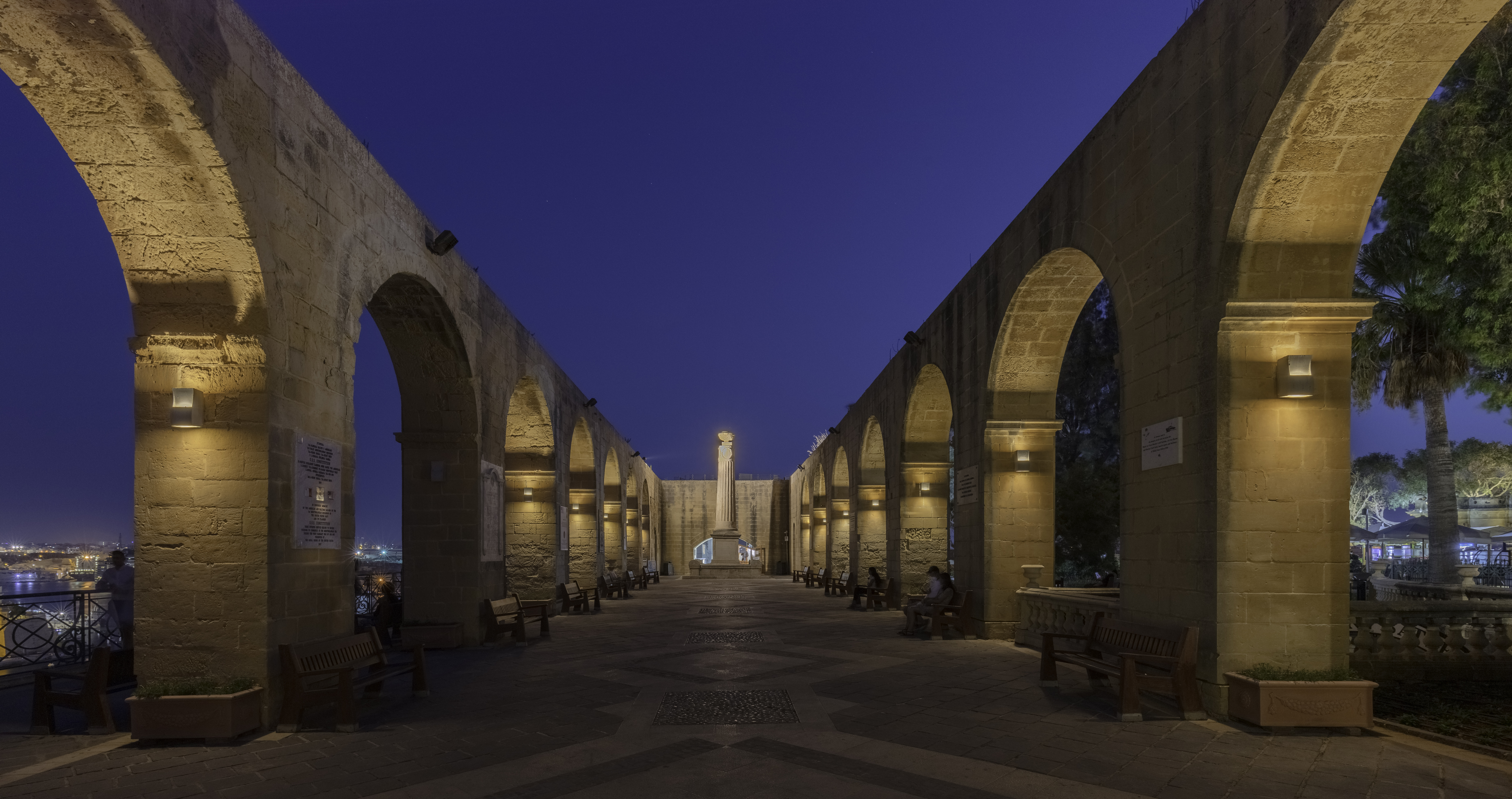
Terrace area

The gardens were originally used to offer recreation to the knights of the Italian langue of the Order of Saint John, but were opened to the public following the end of the two-year French occupation of Malta in 1800.

In the park there are several monuments and memorials to a number of prominent people, including Gerald Strickland, Sir Thomas Maitland and Sir Winston Churchill. A replica of the statue Les Gavroches (the Street Boys) by the Maltese sculptor Antonio Sciortino is also located in the garden. The original is found in MUŻA.

It is the highest point of the city walls, and thus its bordering terrace offers a clear view over the Grand Harbour, the Three Cities, as well as over the shipyard and the lower-lying parts the capital.

The gardens are linked to Valletta's ditch and the nearby Lascaris Wharf by the Barrakka Lift. The first lift on the site was built in 1905, but was closed in 1973 and dismantled in 1983. The lift can be seen in operation in the 1968 British adventure film, A Twist of Sand, based on Geoffrey Jenkins' 1959 novel of the same name. A new lift was inaugurated on 15 December 2012.

== Events and Activities ==
The Upper Barrakka Gardens are not only a historic viewpoint but also serve as a venue for cultural and community events. From the gardens, visitors can watch the daily ceremonial cannon firings at the Saluting Battery below, which usually take place at 12pm and 4pm. The gardens have also hosted events such as the Eco Festival, an artisan market focused on sustainability and local craftsmanship.
