= Great Siege Monument =

Monument in Valletta, Malta

- Il-Monument tal-Assedju l-Kbir (Maltese)
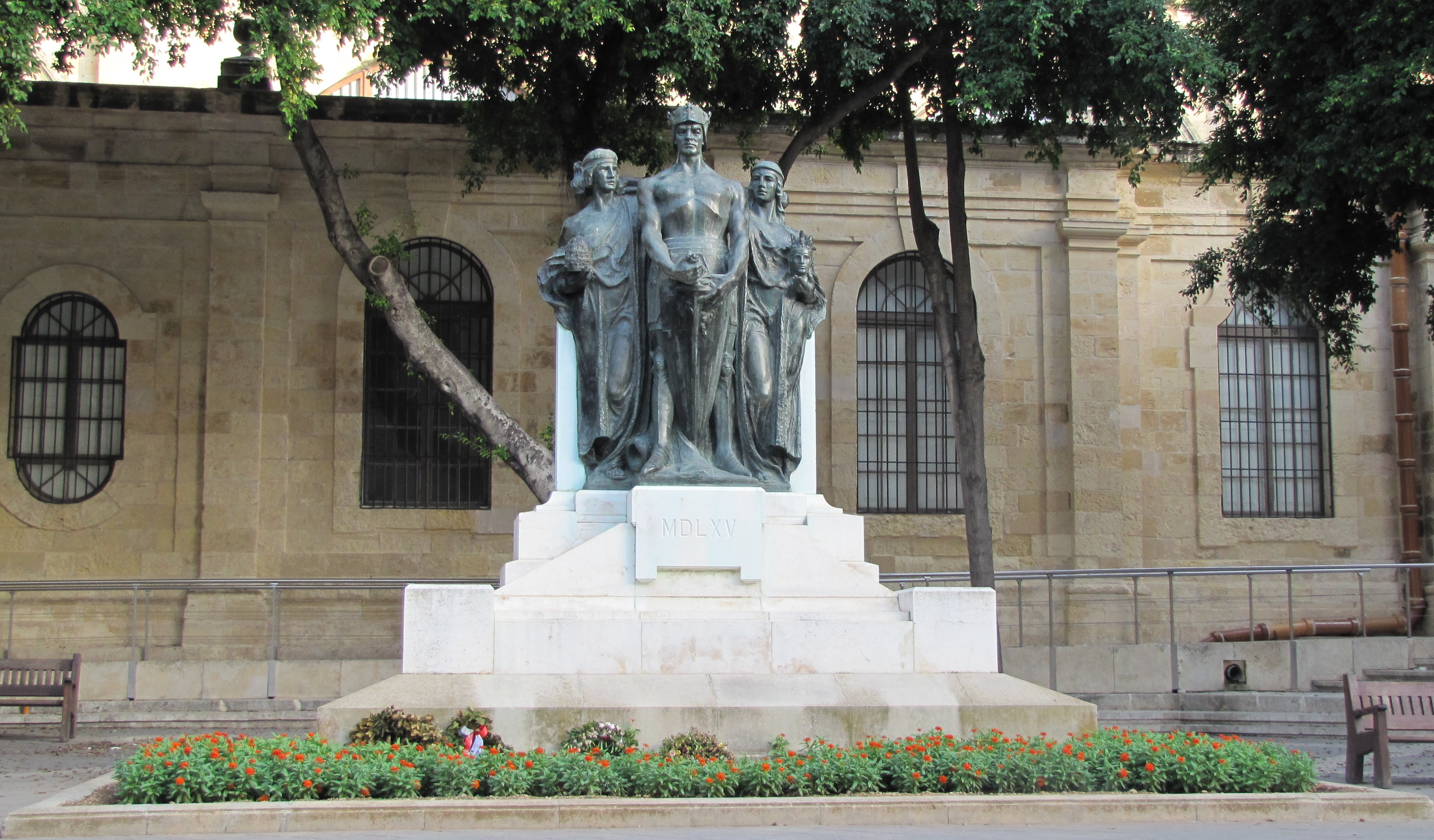
- The monument in 2017
- Artist: Antonio Sciortino
- Completion date: 8 May 1927
- Medium: Bronze
- Movement: Neoclassical
- Location: Valletta, Malta; 35°53′52.9″N 14°30′45.1″E

The Great Siege Monument (Maltese: Il-Monument tal-Assedju l-Kbir), also known as the Monument to the Fallen of the Great Siege, is a monument commemorating the Great Siege of Malta located in Valletta, Malta. It consists of three bronze figures symbolizing Faith, Fortitude (or Valour), and Civilization, standing on top of a granite base. The monument is the work of the sculptor Antonio Sciortino, and it was inaugurated on 8 May 1927.

== History ==
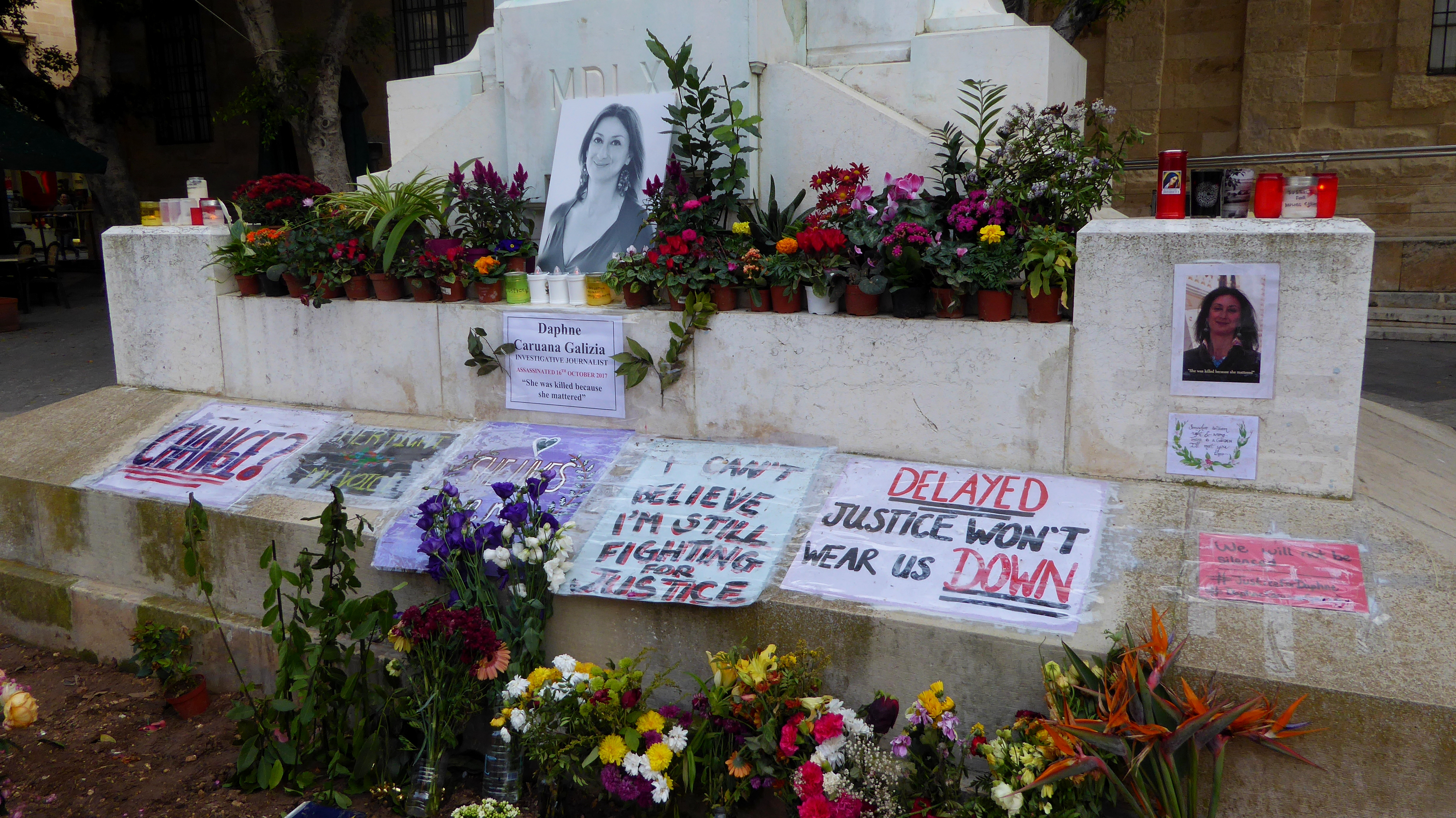
Memorial to Daphne Caruana Galizia at the base of the monument in November 2017

=== Parliament vote ===
The initiative for the Great Siege monument was first suggested by Alberto Magri, then a member of the House of Representatives and later a judge, who put the proposal to the House by Private Member's Bill. In his speech he presented the idea for the placement of a monument and the renaming of the square as Piazza Otto Settembre, and urged all parties to support it in the national interest. On 22 January 1925, the Speaker put the motion to a vote. It was carried with near-unanimous support, the Nationalists under Sir Ugo Mifsud, the Constitutionals under Gerald Stricland, and Enrico Mizzi's Democratic Nationalists voted in favour, while the Labour members voted unanimously against.

=== Inauguration ===
The Great Siege Monument was sculpted by Antonio Sciortino in 1926, while he was in Rome. It was then cast in bronze using the lost-wax method (also called investment casting, precision casting, or cire perdue), and the monument was inaugurated in Valletta on 8 May 1927. During the inauguration, Chief Justice Arturo Mercieca delivered his speech in Italian, while the priest, philosopher and poet Anastasio Cuschieri delivered a speech in Maltese, both in the presence of the British Lieutenant-Governor, Sir Thomas Alexander Vans Best. This illustrated the language question and the political tension of the time.

=== Location ===
The monument is located in Great Siege Square (Maltese: Misraħ l-Assedju l-Kbir) along Valletta's main road, Republic Street (Maltese: Triq ir-Repubblika) by the side of St John's Co-Cathedral. The monument originally faced Auberge d'Auvergne, which was replaced by the Courts of Justice building in the 1960s after the original building had been severely damaged in World War II.

=== Depiction and later history ===
The Great Siege Monument appeared on three Maltese stamps issued in 1956, 1962 and 1972. It also featured on the Maltese 50 cent coin that was minted from 1972 until it was replaced in 1986.

The monument was restored between August and September 2010. It is listed on the National Inventory of the Cultural Property of the Maltese Islands.

Since October 2017, the monument has been used as a makeshift memorial to journalist Daphne Caruana Galizia by members of her family and anti-government protesters. For a while the tributes were removed on a daily basis by Government employees. In 2020, a court decision found that the then Minister for Justice Owen Bonnici's orders to repeatedly clear the memorial were a violation of protestors' human rights for the freedom of expression.

== Description ==
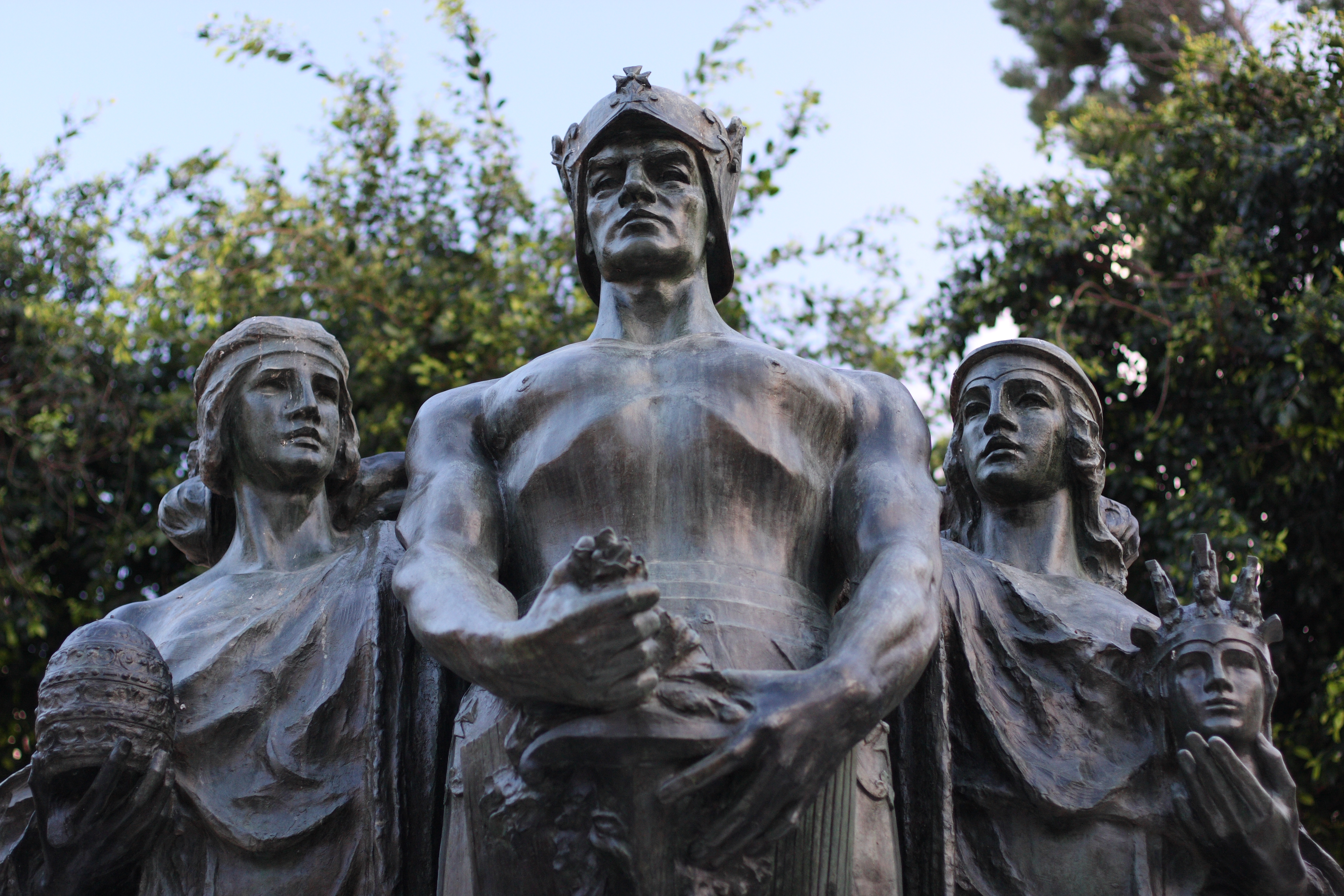
The three figures from left to right: Faith, Fortitude (or Valour), and Civilization

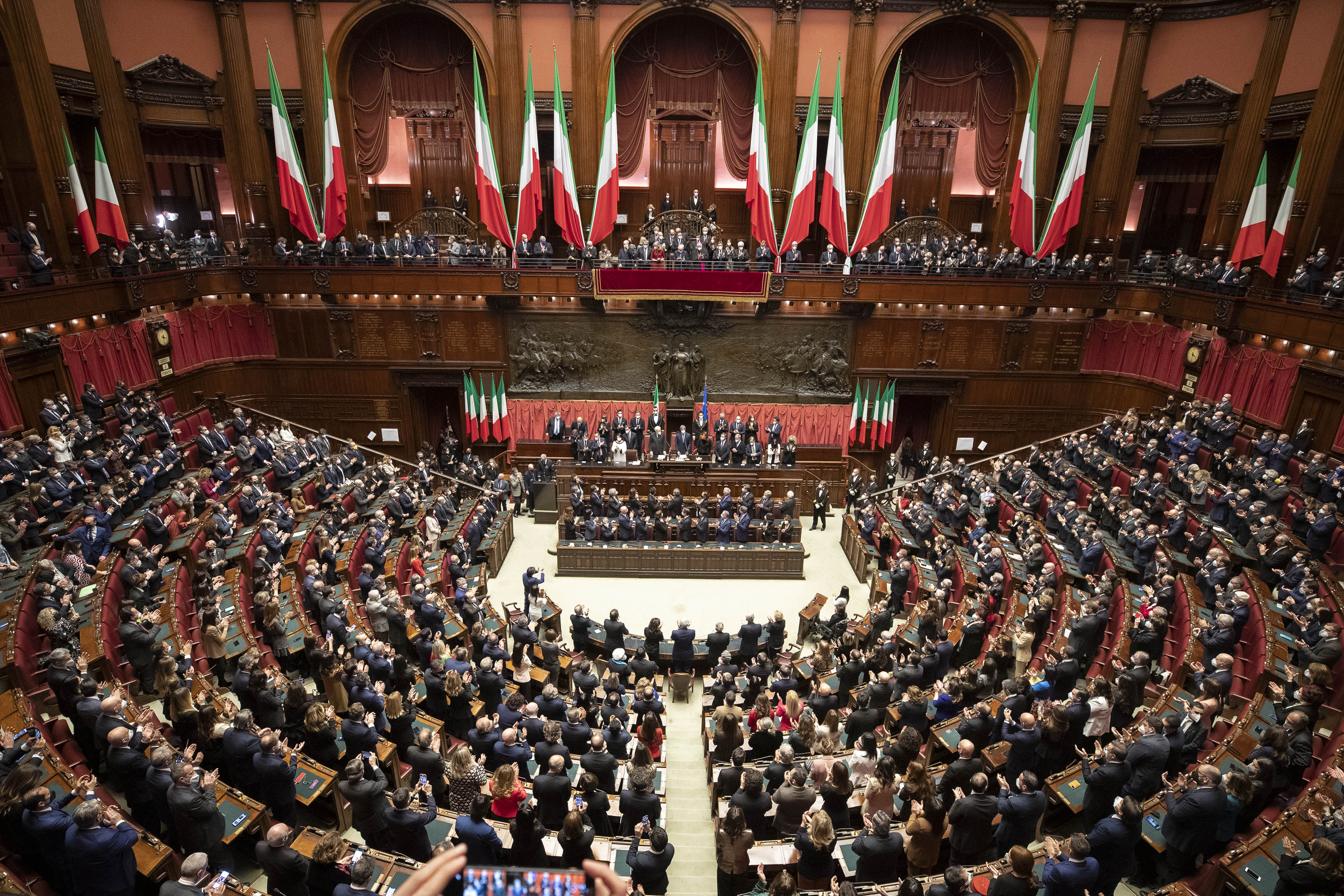
Parliamentary chamber of the Palazzo Montecitorio, with La Glorificazione della Dinastia Sabauda at the top. The three figures in the centre of the relief resemble the positioning of the Great Siege Monument figures

The Great Siege Monument is considered to be a work of Neoclassical sculpture, exhibiting powerful simple lines which hint at Sciortino's avant-garde style. It has been called "one of the most emblematic sculptures on the island". The statue consists of three bronze figures set on top of a granite base. The positioning of the figures relates closely to Davide Calandra's relief La Glorificazione della Dinastia Sabauda at the Palazzo Montecitorio in Rome.

The three figures are said to be allegorical representations of Faith, Fortitude (or Valour), and Civilization. The male figure in the centre is described as Fortitude or Valour, and he is portrayed bare-chested and wearing a three-pointed crown and some armour, while holding a sword and a shield. There is a female figure on either side, with Faith on the left and Civilization on the right. Faith holds a papal tiara, while Civilization holds a mask of Minerva, the Roman goddess of Wisdom.
