= Carmelo Borg Pisani =

Maltese-born artist and Italian Fascist, who was executed for treason (1915–1942)

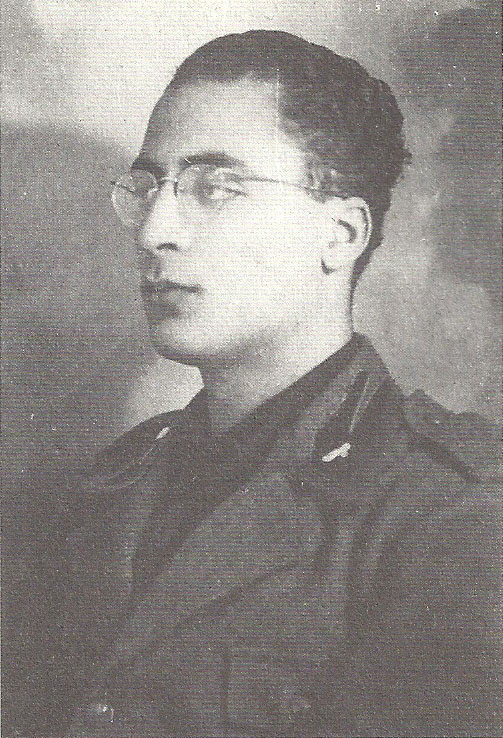
- Born: 10 August 1915 (Note: Some sources claim that Borg Pisani was born on 10 August 1914 and there are primary sources which state that he was 28 years old in 1942, indicating that he was born in 1914. However, other sources give his date of birth as 10 August 1915, and this is confirmed by primary sources such as his 1932 passport application.); Senglea, Crown Colony of Malta
- Died: 28 November 1942 (aged 27); Corradino Prison, Paola, Crown Colony of Malta
- Cause of death: Execution by hanging
- Parent(s): Gaetano Borg; Rosina Borg née Pisani
- Family: Brothers; Fedele Borg (1904–????), Paulo Borg (1910–1994), Sister; Beatrice Martinelli née Borg (1912–1997)
- Espionage activity
- Allegiance: Kingdom of Italy
- Service branch: SIM
- Service years: 1941–1942

Carmelo Borg Pisani (10 August 1915 – 28 November 1942) was a Maltese artist and Italian Fascist spy, condemned to death for treason in 1942. Pisani was a nationalist who believed that Malta's best chance for independence was to expel the British and unite the island with Italy.

== Early life ==
Born into a Maltese Nationalist family in Senglea on 10 August 1915, Borg Pisani enrolled as a student at the pro-Italian Umberto I art lyceum in Valletta. In his teens he attended the network of pro-Italian and pro-fascist organisations in Malta: Valletta's Casa del Fascio (headed by professor Umberto Biscottini) and OGIE (Organizzazioni Giovanili Italiane all'Estero), through which he attended youth camps in Italy, such as Campo Dux in Viareggio in 1930 and another camp in Rome in 1932.

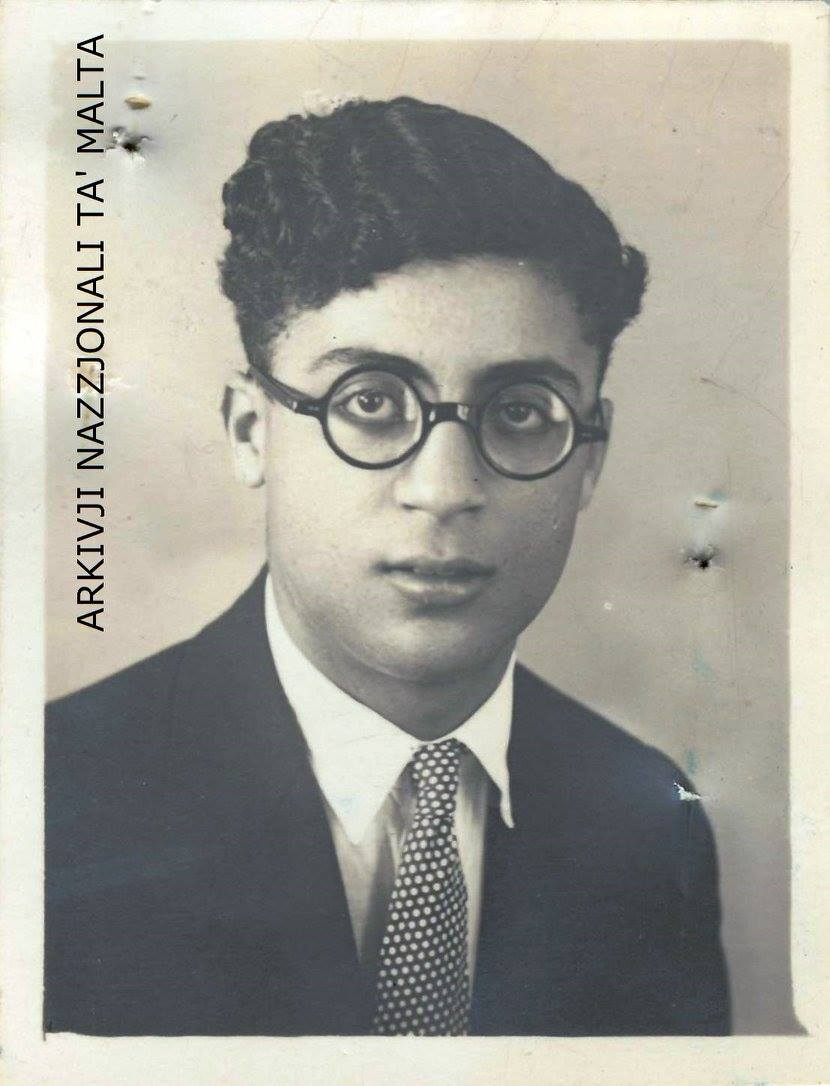
Carmelo Borg Pisani’s passport application photo before leaving to Rome for his artistic studies (1932). Since Carmelo was only 17, the application was submitted by his father Gaetano.

He moved to Italy to attend the Accademia di belle arti di Roma along with other prominent Maltese artists such as Emvin Cremona. He lived in the Italian government-funded "Casa della Redenzione Maltese", where he met other Maltese irredentists, with whom he shared the conviction that the British colonial government was destroying the "Italian soul" of Malta. He also believed that the best opportunity to restore Malta to its original state was to expel the British and unite the island to the Kingdom of Italy. In Rome, Borg Pisani chaired the "Circolo degli Amici della Storia di Malta" and joined the "Comitato d'Azione Maltese", headed by exiled activist Carlo Mallia from the University of Malta. As Director, Borg Pisani took part in the publication in exile of the irredentist newspaper Malta, which had been forbidden by the British colonial authority.

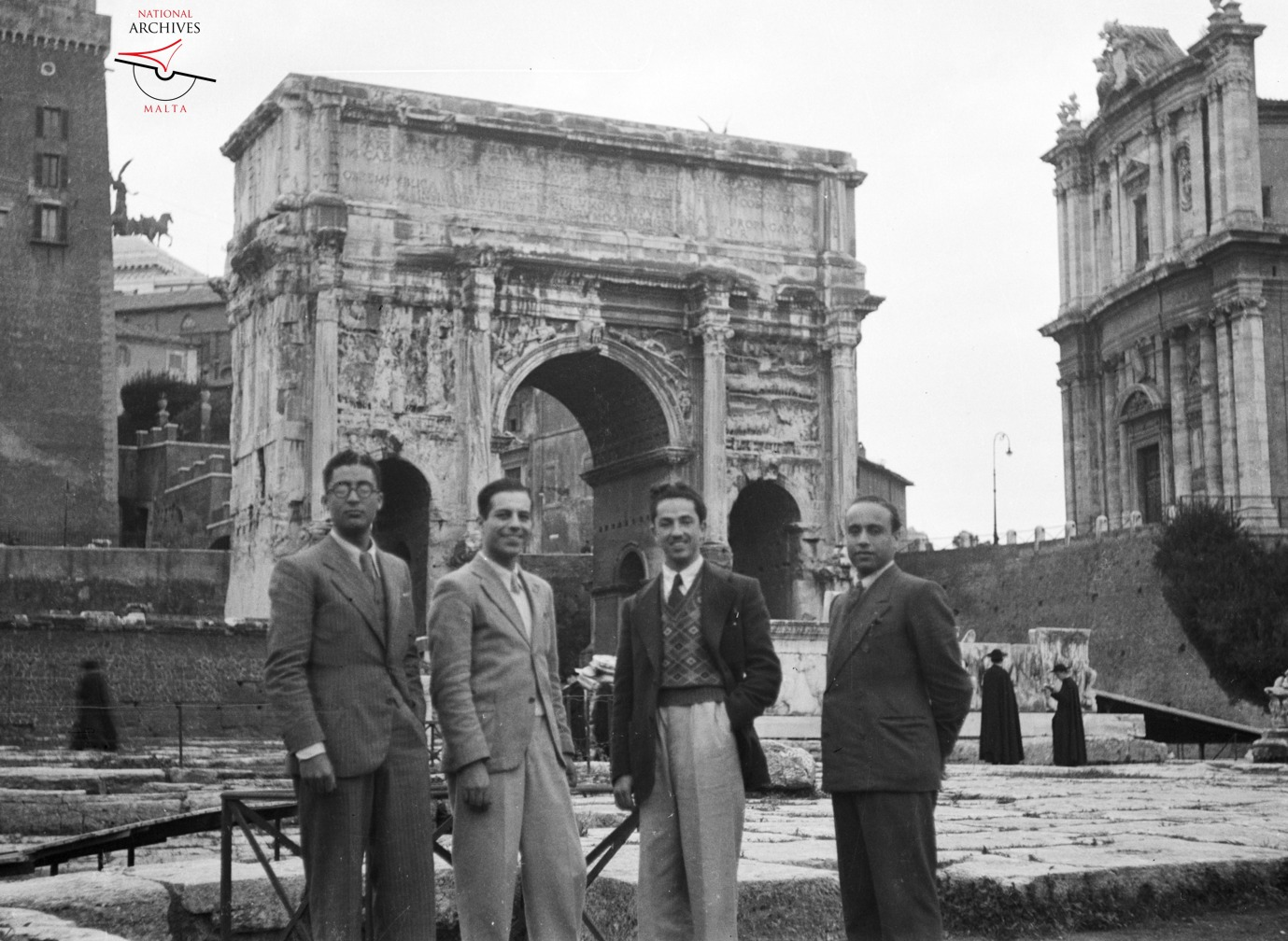
Carmelo Borg Pisani (far left) with friends in Rome. Giuseppe Galea (far right) was also a Maltese artist studying in Rome.

Borg Pisani was a supporter of Fascism. In 1935, he unsuccessfully tried to embark as a volunteer for the fascist war in Ethiopia.

Between 1939 and 1940, he joined the Gruppi Universitari Fascisti and then the Partito Nazionale Fascista.

== During World War II ==
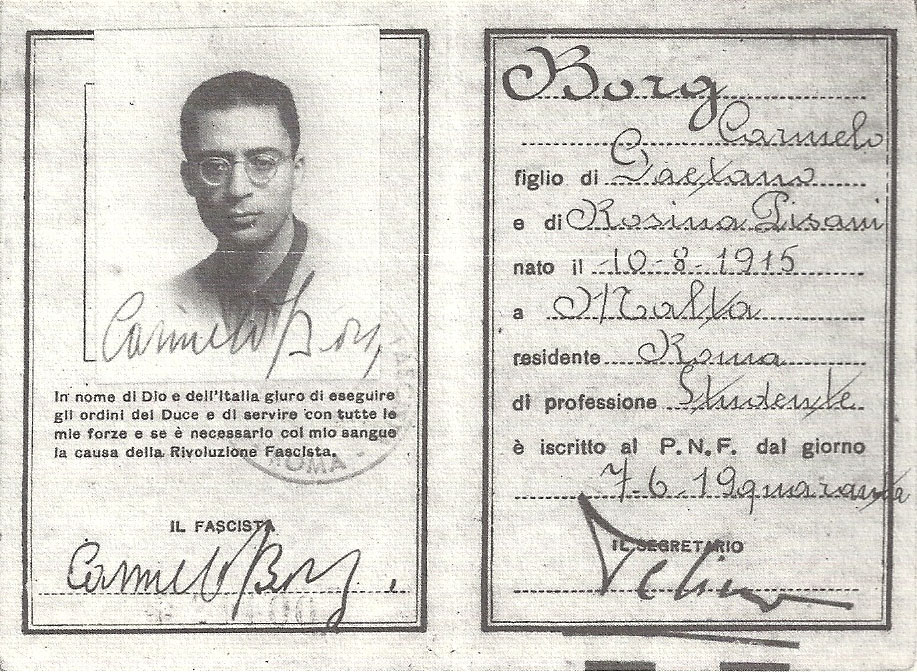
Carmelo Borg Pisani's PNF Party membership card

After the entry of Italy into the Second World War on 10 June 1940, Borg Pisani renounced his British citizenship, returning his British passport through the American embassy (which represented British interests in Rome). Yet he never formally requested nor obtained Italian citizenship, despite later serving in the Italian army.

He also wrote a letter to Mussolini to volunteer for service, but was refused by the Italian Army due to his strong myopia. Thanks to recommendations, including Biscottini's, Pisani was admitted into the Blackshirts, the fascist militia, and later also joined the Servizio Informazioni Militari, the military intelligence. With the Blackshirts, he participated in the Italian occupation of Kefallinia in Greece, where he was injured.

Together with other Maltese irredentists, he then attended the military school of Messina.

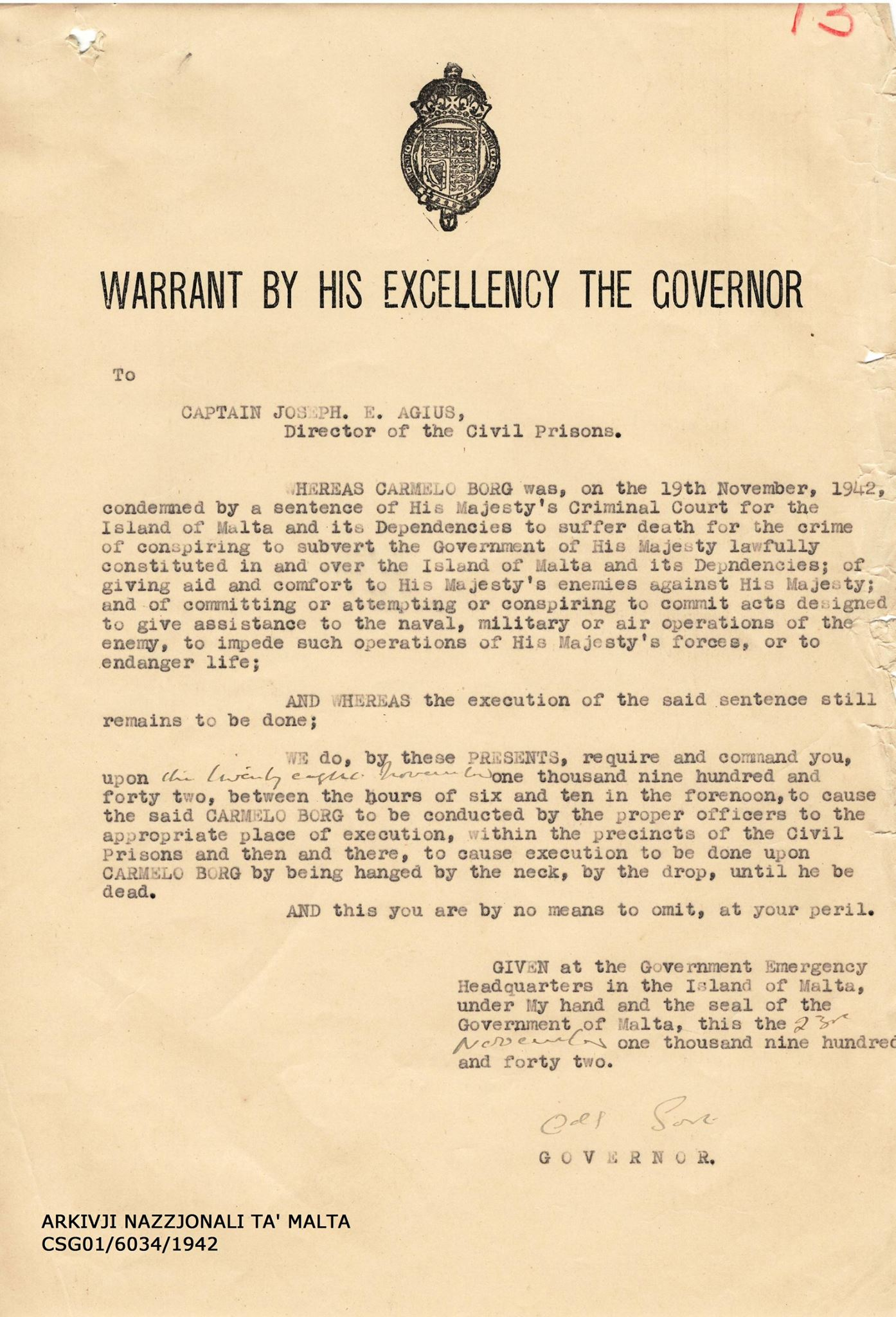
Warrant for the execution of Carmelo Borg Pisani

On 18 May 1942, Borg Pisani volunteered for an espionage mission to Malta, to check British defences and help prepare for the planned Axis invasion of the island (Operation Herkules). He disembarked at the Dingli Cliffs in Ras id-Dawwara and transferred all his rations to a cave that he knew well from his youth. Unusually inclement weather and a rough sea, however, washed all his possessions away within 48 hours, and he proved unable to climb the cliffs. He was forced to wave down a local boat. Upon rescue by a British patrol boat, he was brought to the naval hospital RNH Mtarfa.

There, Borg Pisani was recognized by one of his childhood friends, Cpt. Tom Warrington (1912-1994), who denounced him. British Intelligence kept him under arrest in a house in Sliema till August. He was then transferred to Corradino prison, accused of treason. On 12 November 1942, he stood trial under closed doors in front of three judges, headed by Chief Justice of Malta Sir George Borg, and defended by two lawyers, Alberto Magri and Paul Borg Grech. His plea that he had renounced British citizenship by returning his passport and acquiring Italian citizenship (which would have granted him the status of prisoner of war) was not upheld by the military court. On 19 November 1942, Borg Pisani was sentenced to death for espionage, for taking up arms against the Government and forming part of a conspiracy to overthrow the government.

Borg Pisani's brother, Paulo Borg, who was a priest, tried in vain to save Carmelo's life by submitting a petition to the Governor of Malta, John Vereker, 6th Viscount Gort and beseeched him to use the prerogative of mercy and to reverse the sentence to long-term or life imprisonment instead of execution. The petition for clemency was denied with a note stating that the Governor "sees no reason to interfere with the course of the law".

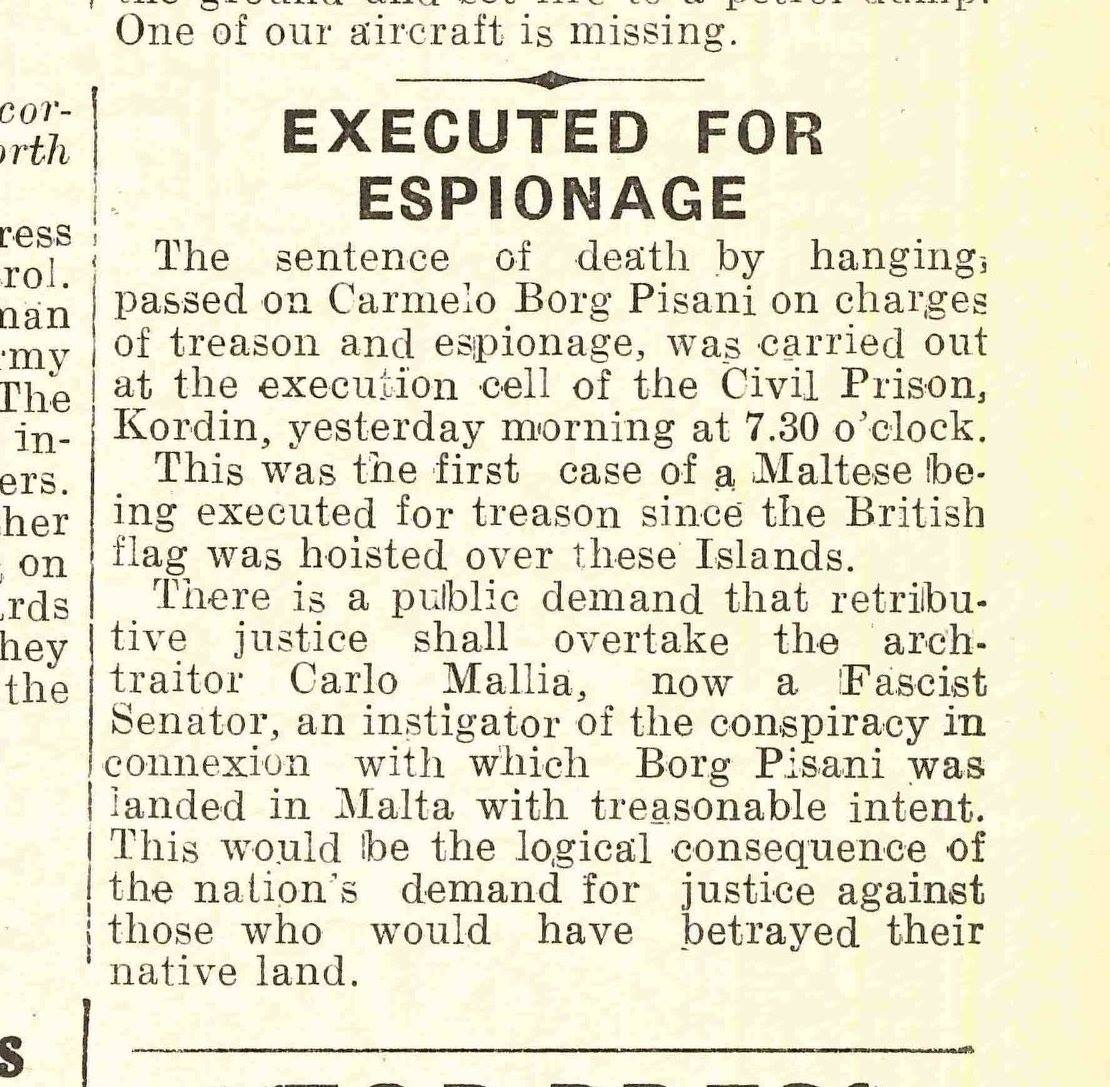
Excerpt of the Sunday Times of Malta about Borg Pisani's execution

His execution by hanging took place at 7:30 am on Saturday, 28 November. Feliċjan Bilocca (1914-1987) was the priest that gave him his last rites and accompanied him to his execution. His remains, initially buried inside Corradino Prison, are now in the ossuary of the cemetery of Paola.

According to Mark Harwood, Borg Pisani might have been betrayed by the Italian Fascists themselves, who by sending him alone on an espionage mission to Malta (where he was very likely to be captured and executed) could have been looking for a propaganda coup against the British with the Maltese population at the height of the war — but the plan did not work. Frank Leighton considered him "a gullible victim of fascist Italy's propaganda".

== Legacy ==
After his death, inside his own jail was found written by him: "I vili ed i servi non sono graditi al Signore" (The cowards and the servants are not esteemed by the Lord). These "last words" have been taken up by many of his supporters. In Italy, Borg Pisani was posthumously awarded the Gold Medal of Military Valor, the highest Italian military award, by King Victor Emmanuel III a few days after his death.

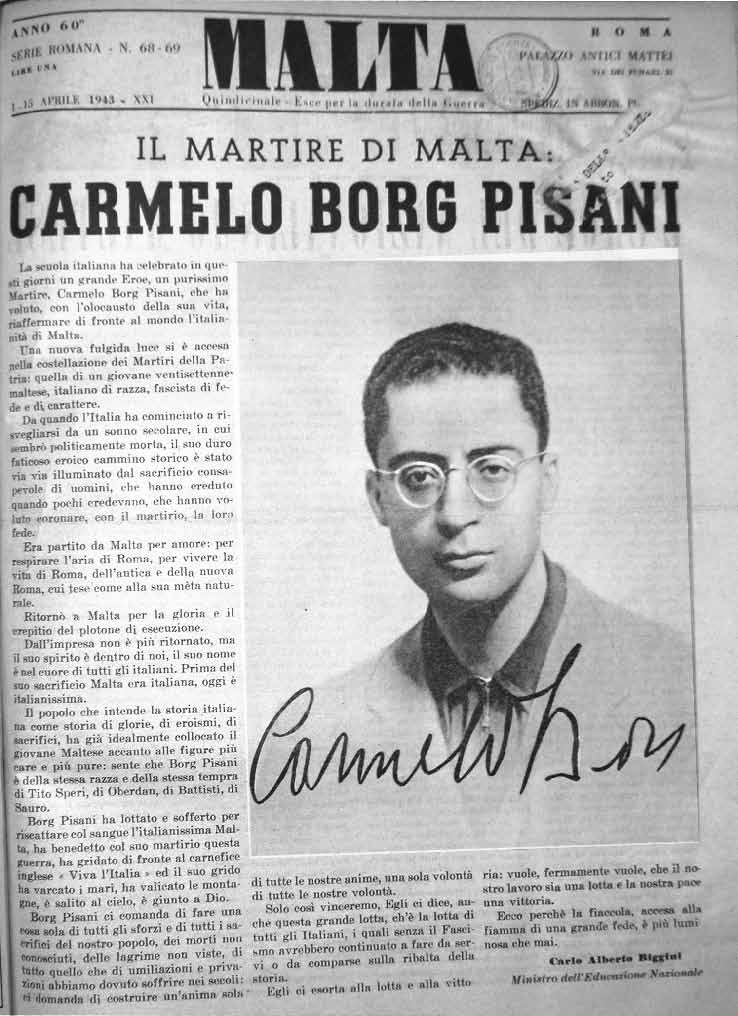
Eulogy to Carmelo Borg Pisani written by Carlo Alberto Biggini, then Minister of National Education of Fascist Italy

Benito Mussolini called him a "Maltese Martyr" and in November 1943 created in his honour in Liguria the blackshirts Battaglione Borg Pisani in which other Maltese irredentists fought.

The art academy where he had studied in Rome was for a brief time rechristened La Regia Accademia di Belle Arti Borg Pisani, and streets in Rome, Turin, Bari and Legnano are still named after him. A neo-fascist group commemorated his death in front of Malta's embassy in Rome in 2010.

Borg Pisani is very well regarded in Italy. Italian historian Giulio Vignoli wrote that Borg Pisani is to be considered one of the last Italian "Risorgimento" martyrs of the Italian irredentism, like Cesare Battisti and Nazario Sauro. Requests have been made by his family and the Italian government to exhume his remains and give them a proper burial, but so far not acceded to.

In his native Malta, Borg Pisani remains a controversial figure. Many view him as a traitor who betrayed the nation to fight for Fascist Italy. On the other hand, many others view him as a patriotic hero who wanted the very best for Malta by breaking free from British rule and uniting the island with Italy.

Norman Lowell, the former leader of the far-right political party Imperium Europa, is known to be a staunch admirer of Borg Pisani. He is known for the quotes "Carmelo Borg Pisani, presente!" and "Onore a Carmelo Borg Pisani!" during a tribute to him in a television interview on One.

== In popular culture ==
A person similar to Borg Pisani appears in the 1953 film, Malta Story.
