= Malta (newspaper) =

Italian language newspaper

Malta Quotidiano Nazionalista
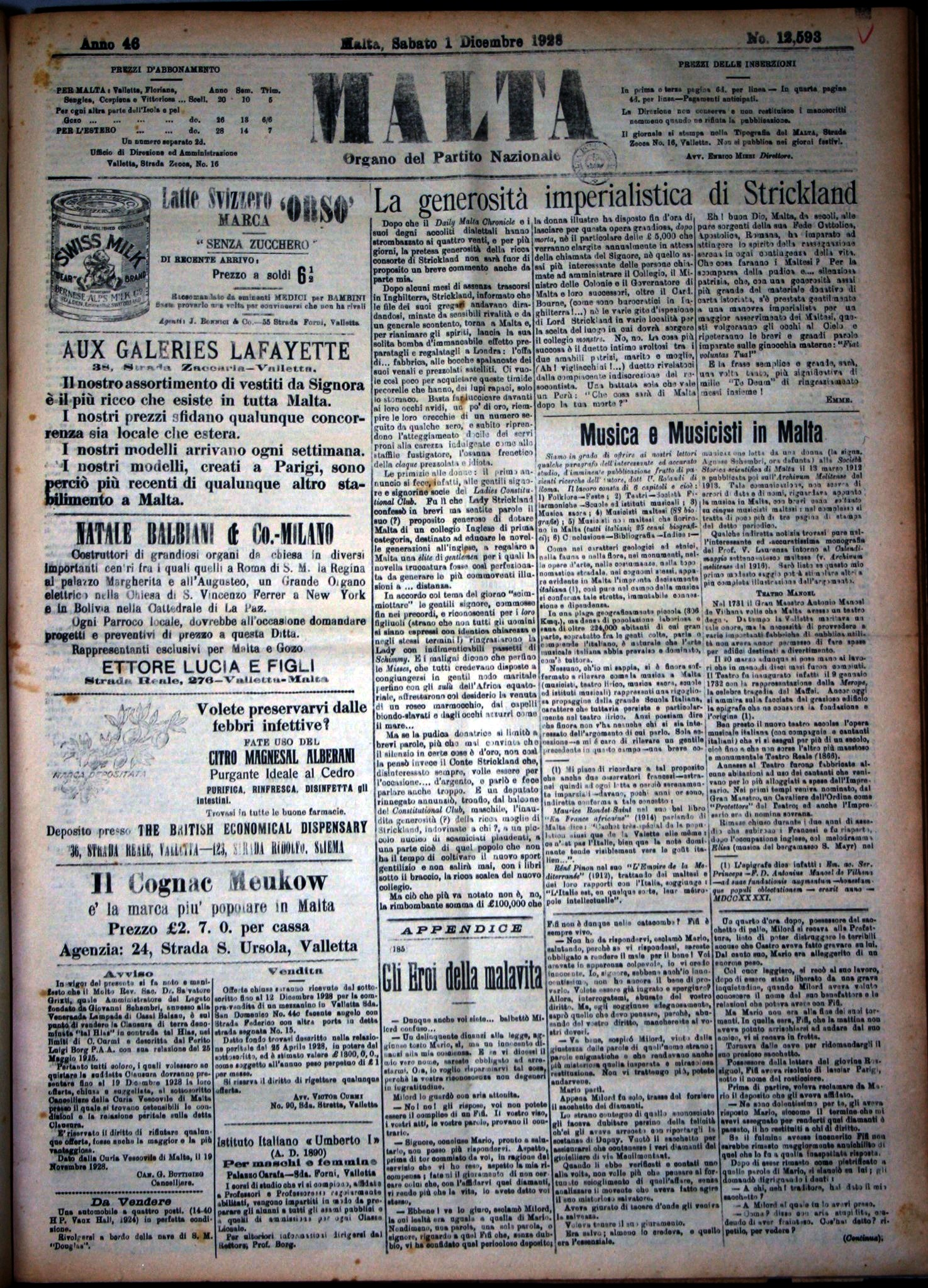
- Type: Daily (1883-1940) fortnightly (1940-1943)
- Format: Broadsheet
- Founder: Fortunato Mizzi
- Editor: Fortunato Mizzi, Enrico Mizzi
- Founded: 1883
- Language: Italian
- Headquarters: Valletta (1883-1940); Rome (1940-1943)
- Country: Malta, Italy

The Malta (subtitled "Quotidiano nazionalista"), sometimes also known as Gazzetta Maltese, was an Italian-language newspaper founded in 1883 in British Malta.

== History ==
Fortunato Mizzi founded the newspaper as an Italian-language press outlet in Malta, at the time a British colony.

In the 1920s and 1930s, the Malta, led by Enrico Mizzi, son of Fortunato, was the press outlet of the Italophiles Maltese irredentists gathered in the Partito Nazionalista.

Following the entry of Italy into World War II, in June 1940 the newspaper was transferred to Rome, where it was written by irredentist emigrants. One of these emigrants was Carmelo Borg Pisani. Published by Calogero Tumminelli, its frequency changed from daily to fortnightly. It stopped its publications in July 1943.
