= Les Gavroches =

Maltese Impressionist sculpture

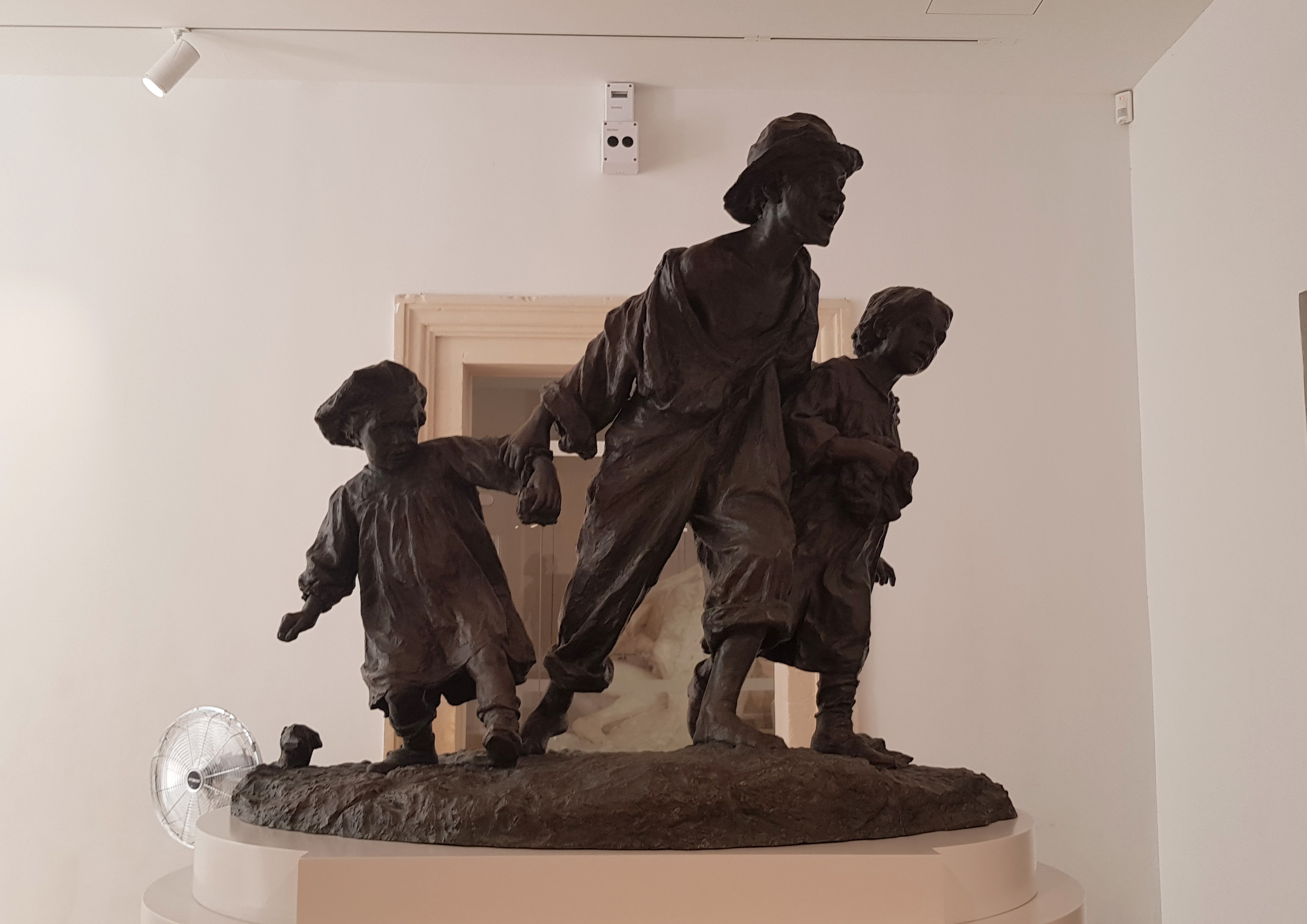
- The sculpture at MUŻA
- Artist: Antonio Sciortino
- Completion date: 1904
- Medium: Bronze
- Subject: Street children
- Dimensions: 92 cm × 150 cm × 124 cm (36 in × 59 in × 49 in)
- Location: MUŻA, Valletta, Malta
- Owner: Government of Malta

Les Gavroches is a bronze sculpture by Antonio Sciortino, depicting Parisian street children inspired by Gavroche from the 1862 Victor Hugo novel Les Misérables. The statue was cast in 1904, and for most of the 20th century it was displayed at the Upper Barrakka Gardens in Valletta, Malta. In 2000, the statue was restored and transferred to the National Museum of Fine Arts (now MUŻA) in the same city, and a replica was placed at the Upper Barrakka.

== History ==
Sciortino completed Les Gavroches in 1904 while he was living in Rome. By the following year, the sculpture had been exhibited in Rome and Paris. It was eventually taken to Malta by the Society of Arts, Manufacturers and Commerce, at a cost of £120 including packing and dock charges.

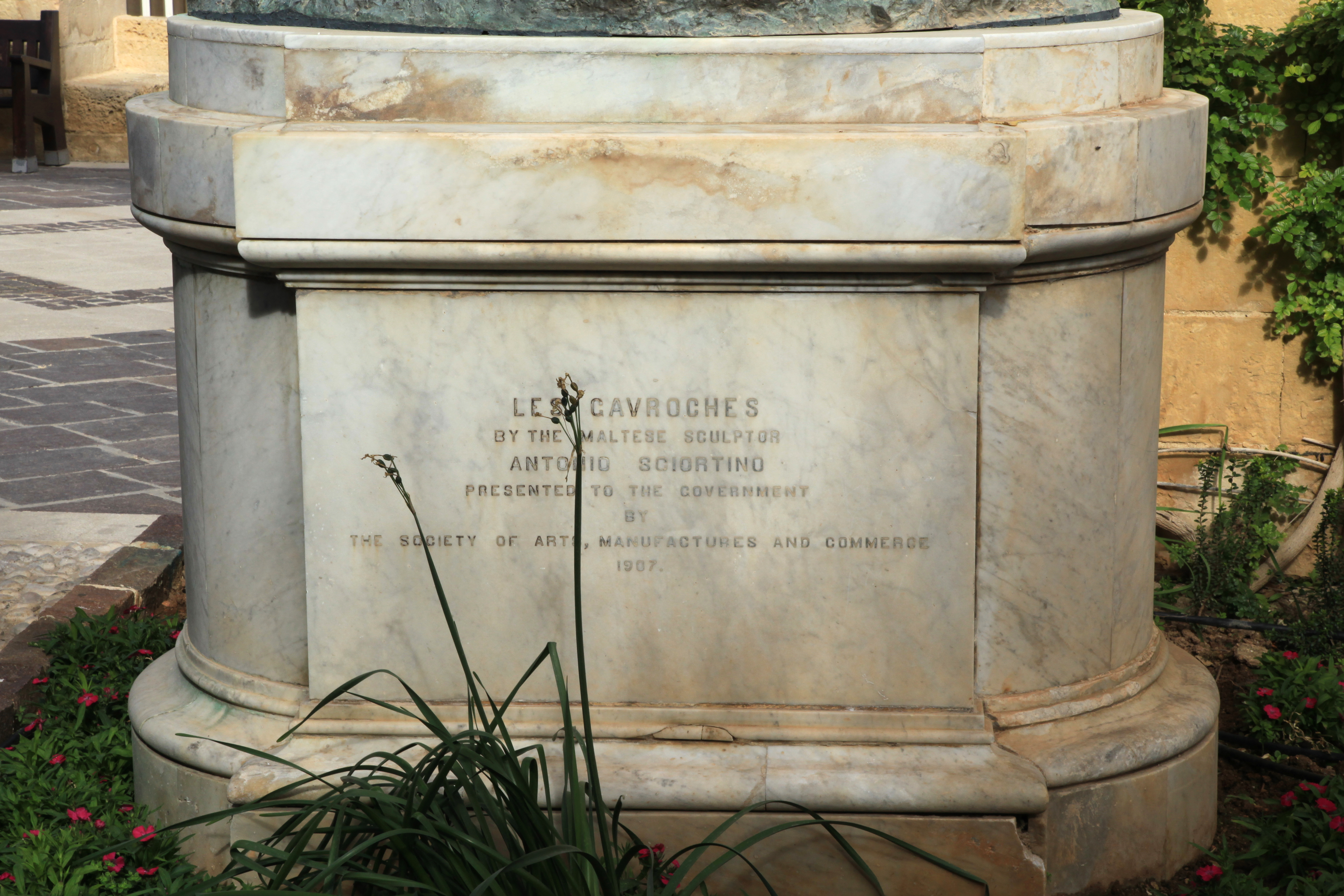
The sculpture's plinth with its 1907 inscription

In 1907, the society presented the statue to the government, and it was inaugurated in the Upper Barrakka Gardens. The sculpture's base contains an inscription commemorating the society's donation of the statue. During World War II, it was removed in order to ensure its safety, but it was put back in place after the war ended.

On 16 January 1951, Prime Minister George Borg Olivier presented a small bronze model of Les Gavroches made by Sciortino to Princess Elizabeth (who became Queen Elizabeth II) in a ceremony held at Auberge d'Aragon.

Due to exposure to the elements, the statue suffered some deterioration over the years. It was removed from the gardens for restoration, which was carried out by Sante Guido at no charge as a gesture of goodwill. The restoration was completed in 2000, and to prevent future degradation the statue was transferred to the National Museum of Fine Arts in Valletta. It is now located at MUŻA.

A replica of the statue was later placed in its original location at the Upper Barrakka. In 2012, environment and culture minister Mario de Marco selected Les Gavroches as Malta's top treasure to be added to Europeana.

== Description ==
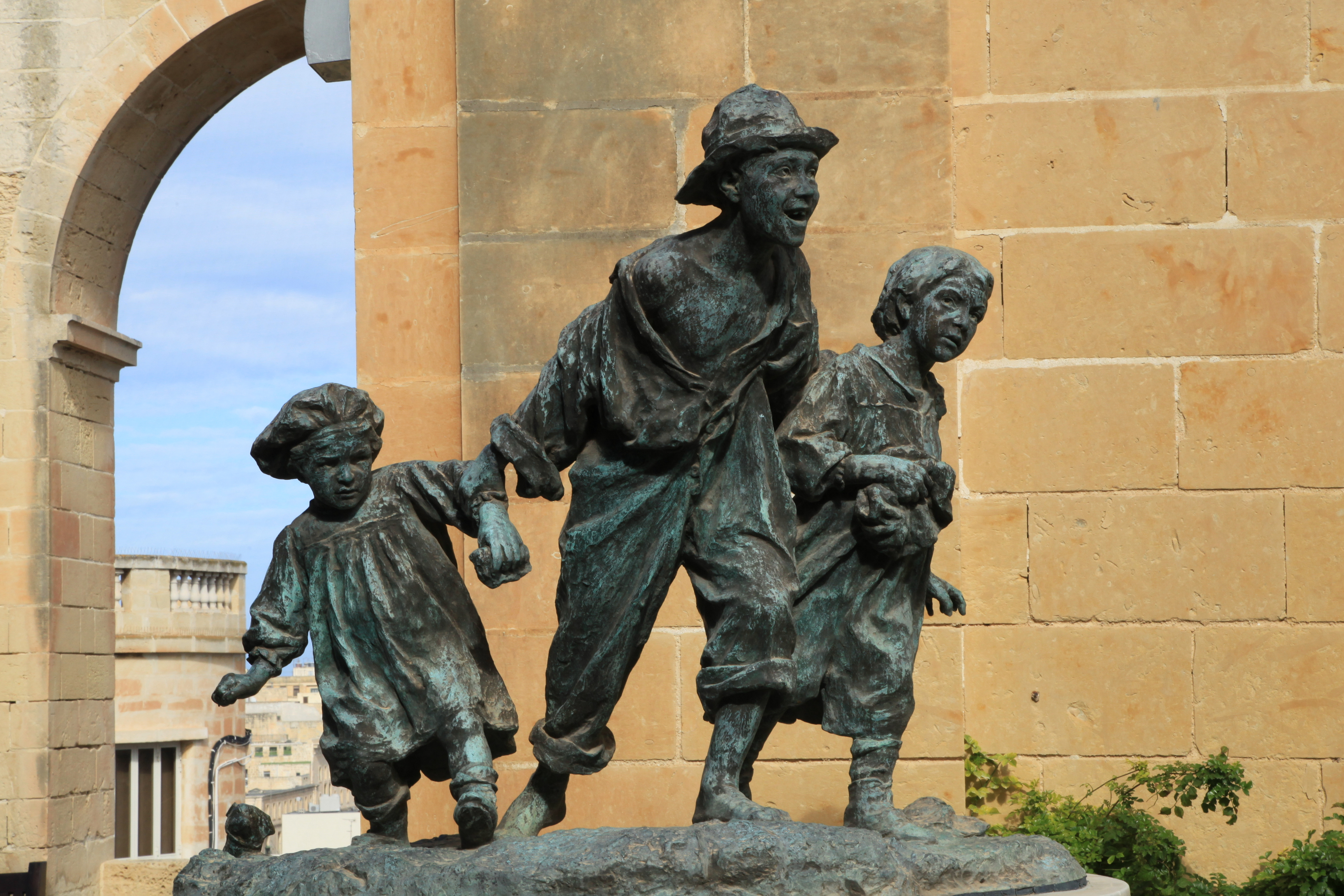
Replica at the Upper Barrakka Gardens

Les Gavroches represents three street children from Paris during the time of the French Revolution of 1848. The subject and title are inspired by the character Gavroche from Victor Hugo's 1862 novel Les Misérables. The sculpture represents the themes of hope and innocence, highlighting the younger generation's aspirations for freedom and progress.

The sculpture shows influence from Impressionism and the work of Auguste Rodin. The statue is one of Sciortino's early works since it was created when he was 24 years old, and it is regarded as one of his finest masterpieces.

== Legacy ==
Les Gavroches was depicted on a 1s6d Malta stamp issued in 1956, on a £M 100 gold coin minted in 1977, and on €10 silver and €50 gold coins minted in 2012. It was also depicted on a Telemalta phone card.

== See also ==
- Adaptations of Les Misérables
