= Antonio Sciortino =

Maltese sculptor

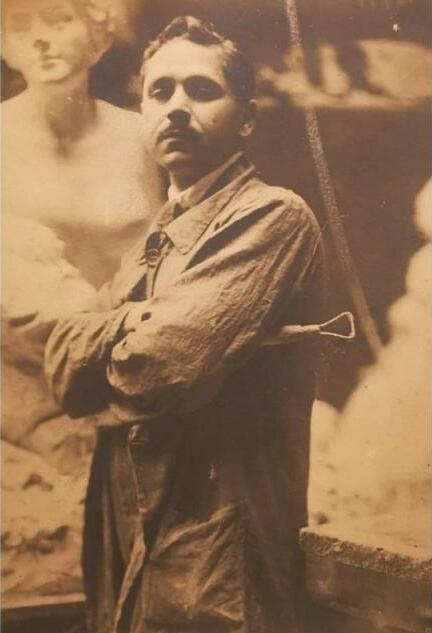
Antonio Sciortino, aged 30, in his studio in Rome

Antonio Sciortino (Ħaż-Żebbuġ; 25 January 1879 – 10 August 1947) was a Maltese artist, considered Malta's foremost sculptor of the twentieth century. His career unfolded almost entirely in Rome, where he resided from 1900 till 1936. Despite his stable residence in Rome, Sciortino maintained strong connections with Malta, where he was commissioned several public monuments, and where its bronzes where later acquired by the Fine Arts Museum.

Sciortino's work reflects several artistic movements, including Realism and Futurism, as well as the influence of Auguste Rodin. He studied and worked in Rome. He developed an original style which drew the admiration of many and brought him commissions in Russia, Brazil and the United States. Sciortino was a director of the British Academy of Arts in Rome (1911–1936), and from 1937 until his death he was a curator in the Malta Museum of Fine Arts.

== Biography ==
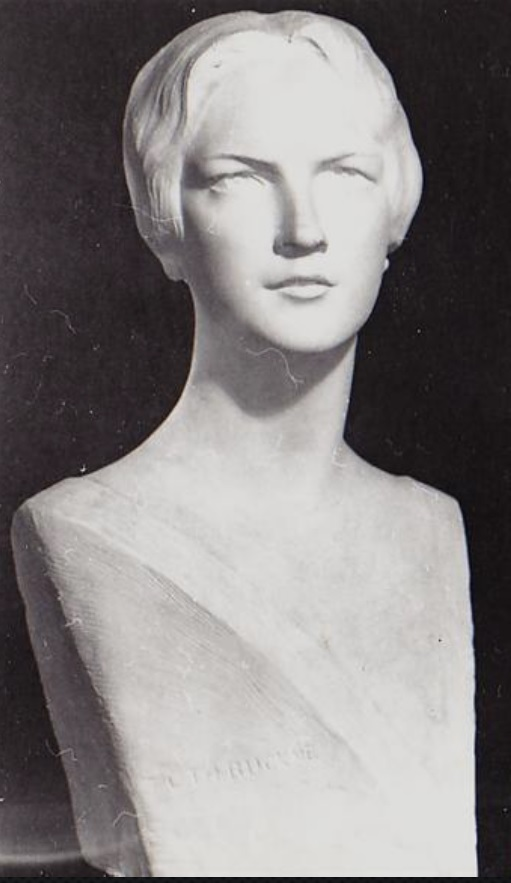
Testa di donna (1904)

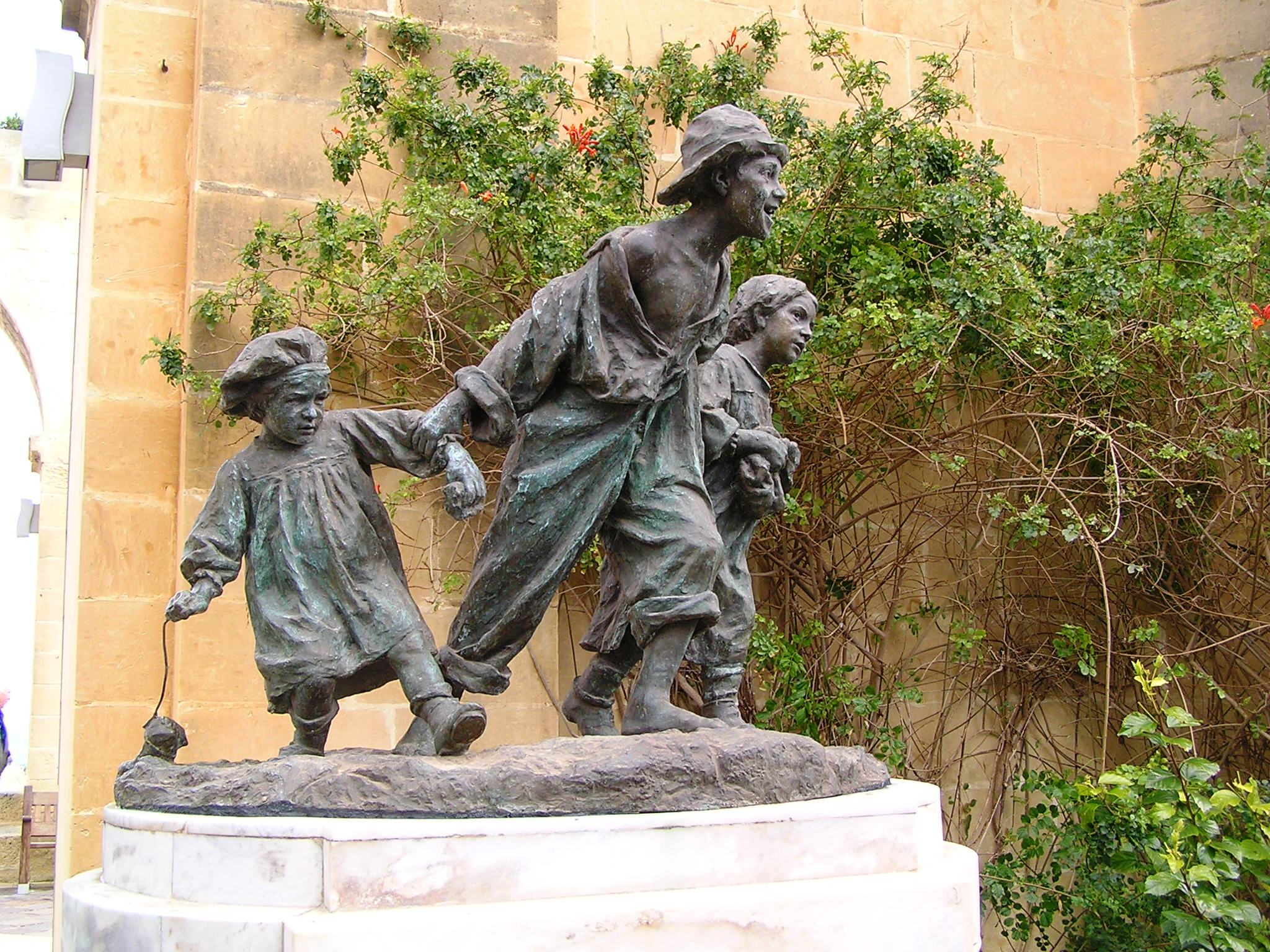
Les Gavroches, 1907

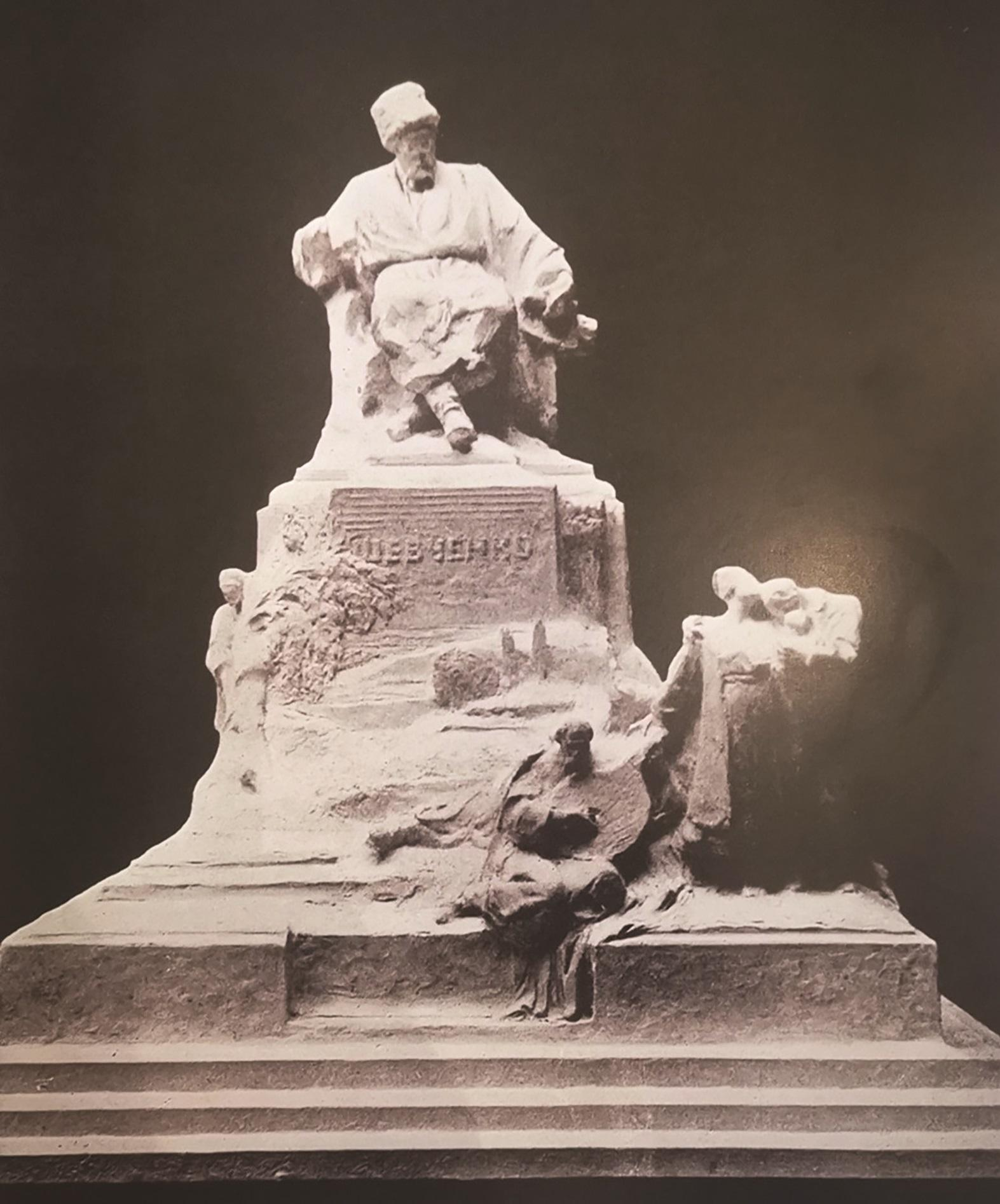
Model for a monumento to Taras Shevchenko

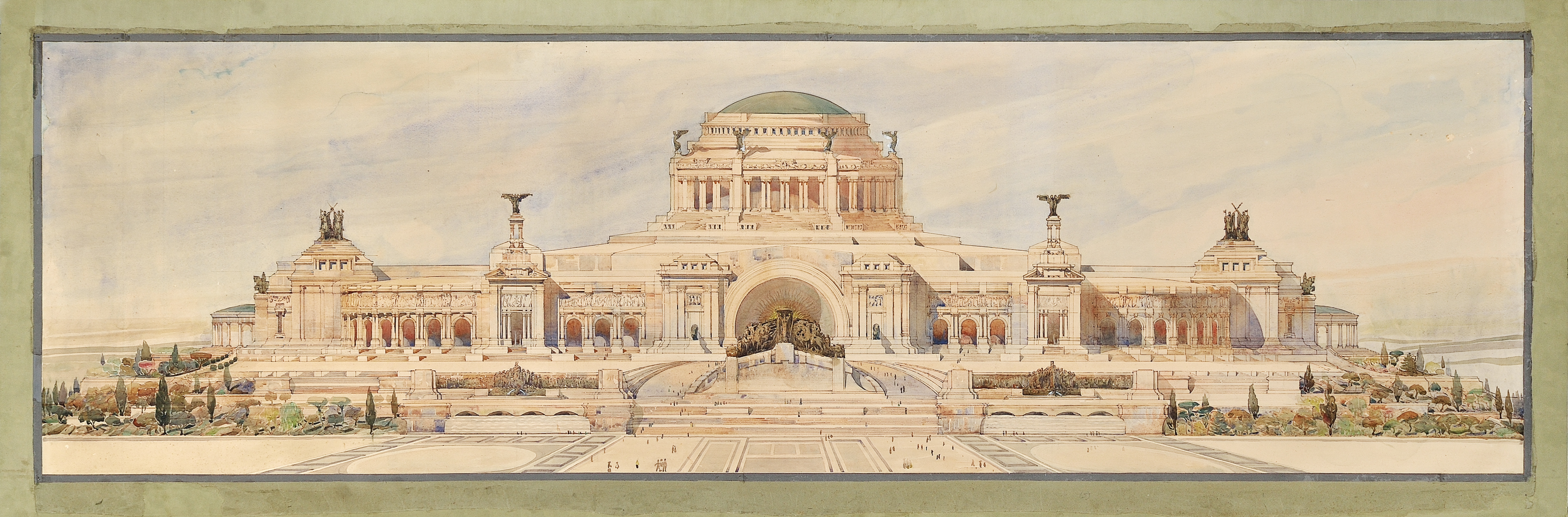
Front Elevation for a Monument to the Unknown Soldier

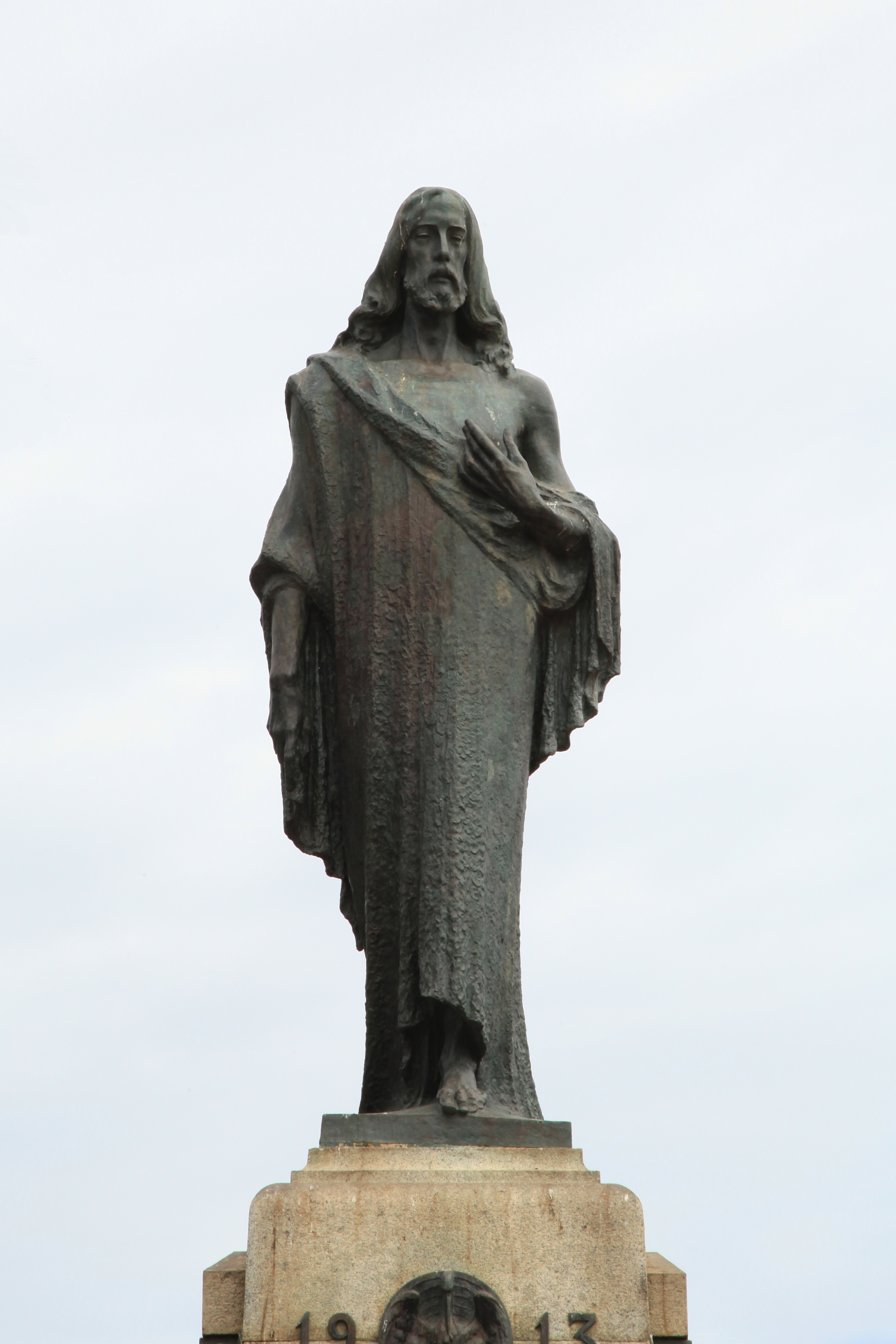
Monument to Christ the King, 1913

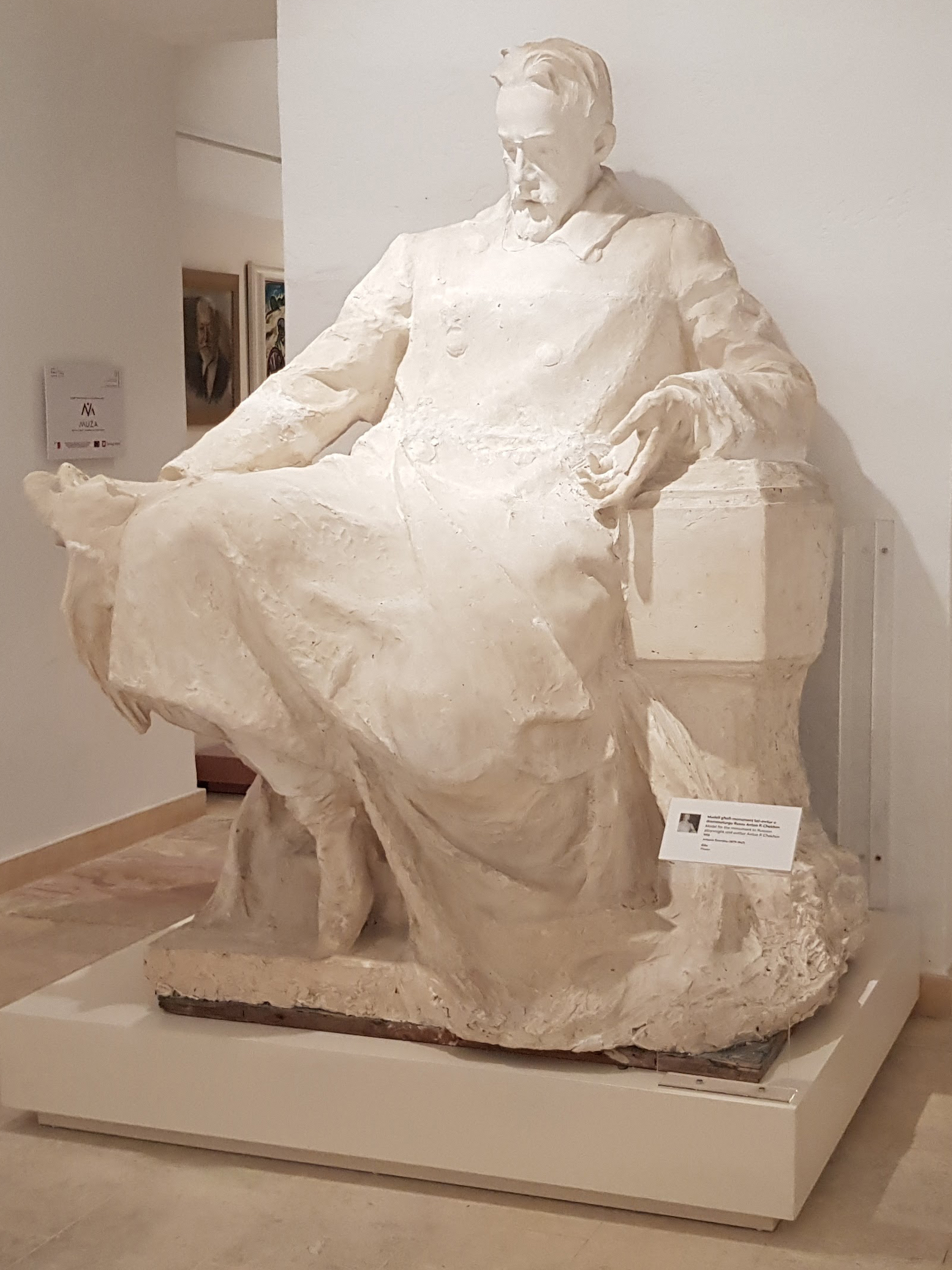
Monument to Anton Chekhov, 1923

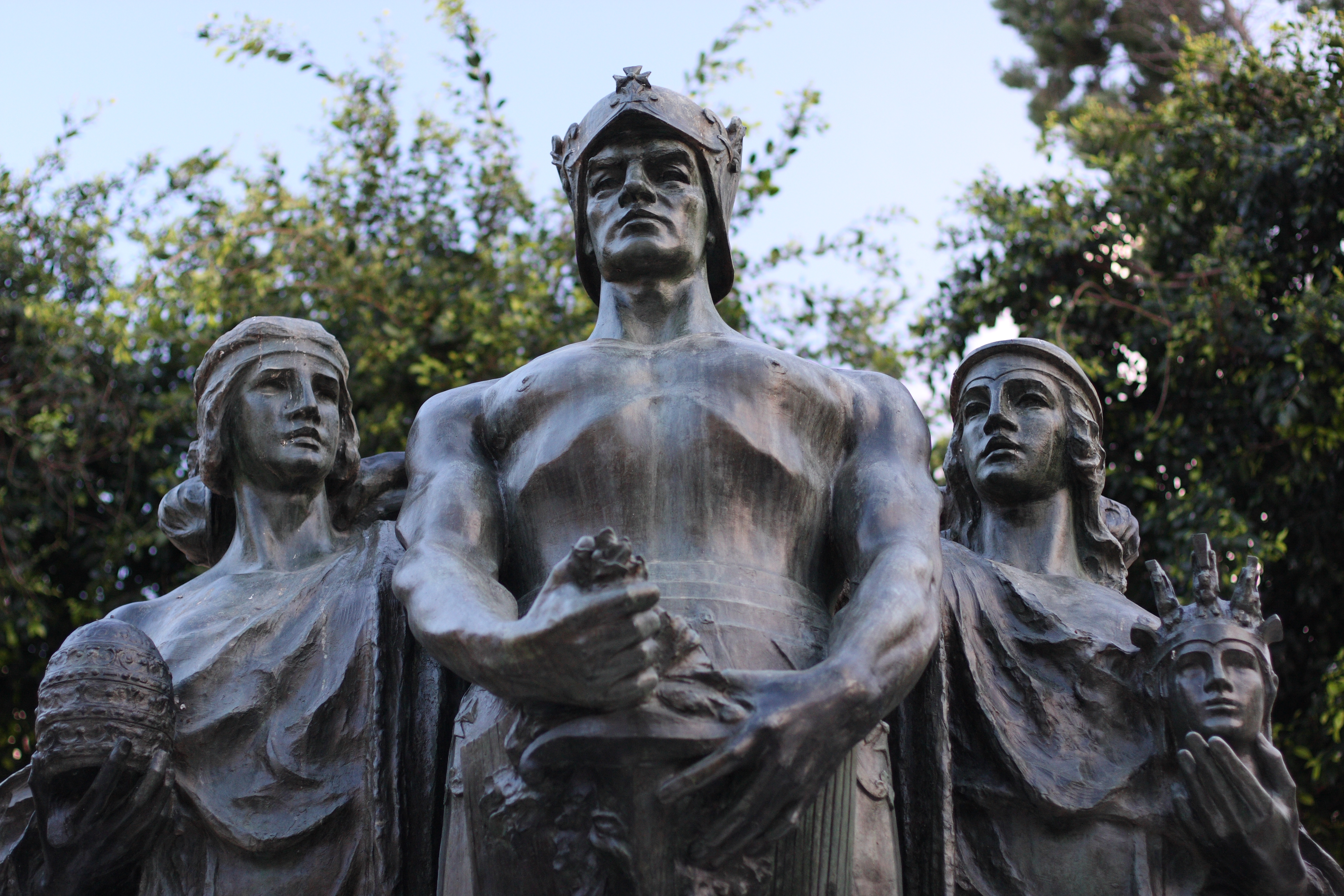
Great Siege Monument, 1927

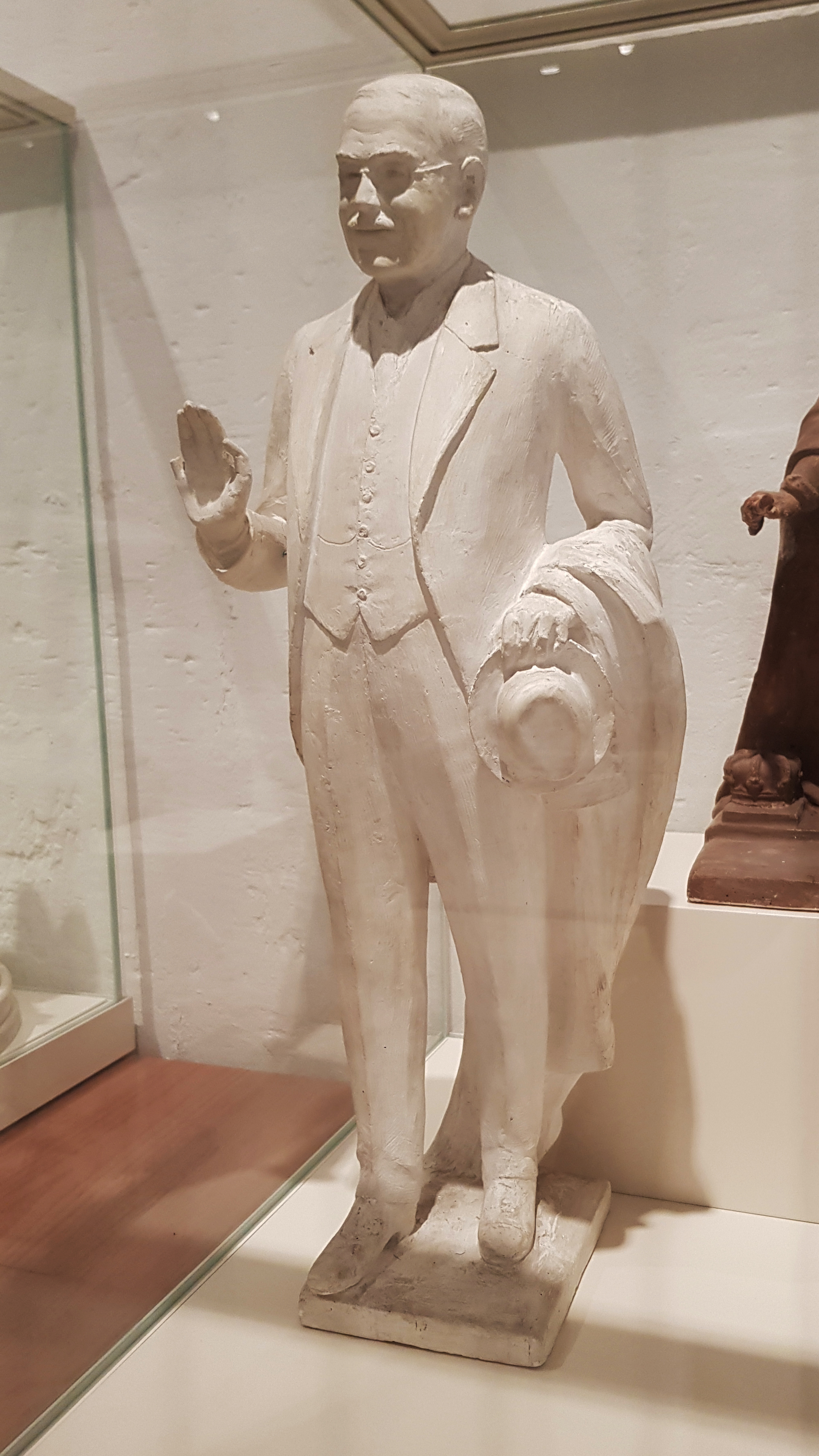
Monument to Lord Gerald Strickland, 1945

From childhood Sciortino showed a tendency towards sculpture, and his aunt Vittorina Sciortino encouraged him to follow this passion. Sciortino enrolled at the Valletta School of Arts, where he studied drawing under the established painter Lazzaro Pisani and modeling and sculpture under Vincenzo Cardona. It was Pisani who encouraged Sciortino to enroll in the School of Art in Valletta where he studied for two years. The Strickland family helped Sciortino to obtain a government scholarship (via the Malta Society of Arts, Manufactures and Commerce) for a course in Rome, where at 22 he went on to continue his studies in art.

In Rome, Sciortino studied in the Istituto Reale di Belle Arti where for two years he studied civil engineering and monumental architecture. He also attended the evening classes at the British Academy and at the Scuola Serale Preparatoria alle Arti Ornamentali at the Museo Artistico Tecnologico.

After earning a diploma with distinction in 1902, he opened an art studio in via Margutta 33 in the heart of the Roman artistic tradition. Here Sciortino decided to free himself from imitative tradition and develop a personal style. Il filosofo (1902) is a work of artistic study with which Sciortino established a reputation as an original artist and which drew the attention of many art critics. This sculpture, along with another known as Testa di Vecchio were shown in an exhibition with the name Promotrice di Roma.

With the statue Studio di Donna (1904) Sciortino moved away from the usual representation of the female figure by contemporary French sculptors, towards an adaptation inspired by Greek art. In the same year Sciortino worked on Les Gavroches, a work which continued to improve his reputation. Depicting three poor children, the bronze sculpture is inspired by the Victor Hugo novel Les Misérables, in which Hugo describes the life of three poor street urchins living in the streets of Paris in the time of the French Revolution of 1848. This sculpture was brought to Malta in 1907 and is considered to be Sciortino's first masterpiece. The original is preserved at MUŻA, while a replica is exposed in the Upper Barrakka Gardens. The mould of the statue is today at Buckingham Palace, a gift which the Government of Malta gave to Princess Elizabeth II in the name of the Maltese people when she visited the islands in 1951.

Sciortino's fame emerged from the Italian capital and spread to other artistic centers in Europe. Antonio Sciortino won several international competitions that made his name known in America, Russia, Japan and South Africa where some of his best works are located. His participation in international exhibitions raised interest in Rome and in the Royal Academy of Arts in London. This success led to his appointment in 1911 as director of the British Academy of Arts in Rome, a position he held for twenty-five years.

In 1905 Sciortino won the competition for a monument to Sir Adrian Dingli, which was unveiled in April 1907 in the presence of King Edward VII and Queen Alexandra in the Mall Garden of Floriana. A little while later he was given a commission for a sculpture representing Il lavoratore (The worker) for the Casa del Popolo in Rome.

In 1909 Sciortino worked on "Irredentism" which was exhibited in Venice. It is an allegorical representation of Italy, completed with the sentence from Dante's Inferno "sì com'a Pola, presso del Carnaro / ch'Italia chiude e suoi termini bagna" (as in Pula, near Kvarner, which closes Italy and wets its borders). Writing in Vita d'Arte, art critic Ettore Cozzani defined it a "strana idea in forma non cattiva" (weird idea in not a bad form).

Until the year 1910 Sciortino worked on two more statues, Germinando un'idea and Remorse, which both reflect the influence of Auguste Rodin. During a visit to Paris, Sciortino worked a bust of Leo Tecktonius, an American composer and pianist. This work impressed Rodin, who asked him to create a model for him and to meet him personally. This meeting initiated the lasting friendship between them.

In 1911, Antonio Sciortino participated in an international competition for the monument in memory of emperor Alexander II of Russia (1818–1881). His designs and models won the first prize but the prize was not given for a formal reason. However, Tsar Nicholas II, fascinated by the project, bought the designs willingly.

In 1913, Sciortino entered a competition to build a monument to the Ukrainian poet Taras Shevchenko. The designs were accepted and the sculptor won first place. This monument, made of granite and bronze, is 7.5 meters high and represents the poet in an act of meditation sitting on a tree trunk wearing the Ukrainian national dress. On the pedestal there is a group of figures representing the people of Ukraine.

In 1914 Sciortino wanted to join the Royal Engineers, but on the advice of the ex-governor of Malta, Lord Grenfell, he continued with his work in Rome to start work on a memorial for the first world war. For three whole years Sciortino was mesmerized by the thought, planning and modeling of this vast and imposing monument which was to be known as the Temple of the British Empire to the Unknown Hero. Sciortino realized this work in a 1:200 scale clay model. It is said that the idea of a memorial in honor of the 'Unknown Soldier' is a creation of the Maltese artist.

As a memorial of the 24th International Eucharistic Congress held in Malta in 1913, Sciortino was commissioned to complete a monument. This work, entitled "Christ the King", was unveiled in Floriana on 30 December 1917 during a religious ceremony which around 40,000 Maltese attended. The statue of Christ the Redeemer is a bronze figure 3.5 meters high that dominates on a granite pedestal and expresses the majesty and greatness of a king. Malta is represented as a female figure kneeling under the pedestal in an act of submission while asking for a blessing. The figure also recalls the victories over "the enemies of Christ". Originally, Sciortino planned the monument with a figure of Christ only because the main goal was a representation of transubstantiation, the concept of the real presence of Christ in the Holy Eucharist. For this, the figure of Malta does not look at the face of Christ but instead bows her head in an act of reverence bringing before her eyes the image of the body and blood of Christ.

In 1922, Sciortino examined the Isleworth Mona Lisa, and wrote a letter expressing his opinion that it "is a very beautiful picture and is in perfect state of preservation and in my opinion is school of Leonardo da Vinci, also 'Bottega di Leonardo' (Studio of Leonardo)".

On commission of the people of the Crimean Autonomous Soviet Socialist Republic, Sciortino had to complete a monument for the Russian writer Anton Pavlovich Chekhov to be erected in Rostov-on-Don. The plaster draft was completed in 1923 but the bronze monument was not realized due to the turmoil in Russia following Lenin's death in 1924. Today the plaster cast is in the courtyard of the National Art Museum in Valletta.

Between 1924 and 1927 Sciortino completed Rhythmii Vitae, a work considered one of his best in bronze and which was exhibited in the Royal Academy of Arts in London. He worked on a bust of Carmen Sylva on a stetina of the royal family of Romania and created an imposing monument commemorating the proclamation of Brazil as a Republic. At this time he also worked on the bust of Marquess Godi de Godio.

On 8 May 1927 another great monument of Sciortino was unveiled in Malta, the Great Siege Monument, located in front of the Auberge d'Alvergne (today's Court of Justice). This monument commemorates the bravery and heroism of the Maltese in the Siege of 1565. The monument is composed of three figures that represent courage, faith and civilization.

In 1929 Sciortino's design for an equestrian monument of General Simon Bolivar took second place.

Between 1931 and 1936, in preparation for an exhibition by the American Art Commission, Sciortino completed a number of works of different artistic forms and subjects – in all twenty-one pieces of sculpture in plaster, bronze and marble. Among these we find Lindbergh on Eagle, Courage of Future Generation, Arab Horses, In the Jungle, Detachment of the Soul from Humanity, Speed ', Madonna protecting Navigators, Dangerous Sport, Consolation, Late, First Kiss, Laughing, Surprised, Smiling and others. These are all jobs that express vitality and enthusiasm. Finally the exhibition could not take place due to the death of the chairman of the commission Frank Pedry, the economic recession that America was going through, and the international political events.

In 1936 the British Academy of Arts in Rome had to close due to political conflicts over the Italian invasion of Abyssinia. This caused Sciortino to resign from the position he held within the academy and to return to Malta where, on 3 May 1937, he was appointed curator and inspector of fine arts at the then Malta Museum. He spent his last years of life committed to saving Malta's cultural heritage from the ravages of the Second World War. Sciortino's last work was the monument of Lord Gerald Strickland erected in 1945 in Valletta's Upper Barrakka Gardens. Upon his death, Sciortino bequeathed his collection of plaster casts and drawings to the nation; they are today held at MUŻA.

Asked how to say his name, he told The Literary Digest it was shore-TEA-no.

As a cosmopolitan Maltese of British citizenship who at the beginning of the twentieth century lived for almost thirty years in the capital city of Italy, Sciortino is known for great interest for Maltese social history; he thought about identity, personality and the Maltese language – this especially from a person in a position of wider perspective and consequently with greater objectivity. He kept in touch with his country, although the exact reasons are unknown. He was offered Italian citizenship but chose to keep the British one. How Sciortino thought about Italian fascism—he lived through the birth of this movement, and how he associated it and thought about the Maltese national movement. Of interest is the loyalty to England; this when compared to many Maltese art students, who in the last years that Sciortino was in Rome were going to study there on scholarships granted by the Italian government – most of them actually felt a great attraction towards the fascism and to Italy. It is of interest if Sciortino had contact with these students who used to meet in the association of the Regia Deputazione per la Storia di Malta.

== Works ==
Image	Year	Work	Location
	1902	Il Filosofo (The philosopher)	
	1903	Testa di Vecchio (Old man's head)	
	1904	Studio di Donna (Study of a woman)	Hermitage Museum, St.Petersburg, Russia
	1904 [Debono: 1907]	Les Gavroches	MUŻA / Upper Barrakka Gardens, Valletta, Malta
	1907	Model for a Monument to Sir Adrian Dingli	
		Monument to Sir Adrian Dingli	Mall Gardens, Floriana, Malta
	1909	Il Lavoratore (The worker)	Casa del Popolo, Roma
	1909	Irredentismo	
	1910	Germinando un'idea	MUŻA, Valletta, Malta
	1910	Remorse	MUŻA, Valletta, Malta
	1910–1911	Leo Tectonius (sculpted in Paris)	Hermitage Museum, St.Petersburg, Russia
	1911	Model for a monument to Russian emperor Alexander II	
	1913	Competition model for a monumento to Taras Schevchenko	
	1913 [Debono: 1917]	Eucharistic Congress Monument to Christ the King	Mall Gardens, Floriana, Malta
	1914 [Debono: 1917]	Model of the Temple of the British Empire to the Unknown Soldier	MUŻA, Valletta, Malta
	1915	Kneeling female angel (funerary sculpture for Violet May Court)	Protestant Cemetery, Rome
	1918	Bust of a smiling lady	MUŻA, Valletta, Malta
	1919	Bust of Elisa Gollcher	MUŻA, Valletta, Malta
	1920	Bust of a lady	MUŻA, Valletta, Malta
	1923	Monument to Anton Chekhov	MUŻA, Valletta, Malta
	1923	Rhythmii Vitae	MUŻA, Valletta, Malta
	1924?	Bust of Carmen Sylva	MUŻA, Valletta, Malta
	1925	Bust of Tina Mazzarini	MUŻA, Valletta, Malta / Hermitage Museum, St.Petersburg, Russia
	1925	The dancer Nina De Vetlina	MUŻA, Valletta, Malta
	1926	Monument for the Republic of Brasil	
	1926	Study for a monument to Deodoro da Fonseca	
	1927	Bust of Marquess Godi de Godio	MUŻA, Valletta, Malta
	1927	Monument to the Fallen of the 1565 Great Siege	Valletta, Malta
	1928 [Buhagiar]	Model of a lighthouse in New York	MUŻA, Valletta, Malta
	1928	Model for a monument to Anita Garibaldi	cf.Archivio Storico della Federazione Nazionale Volontari Garibaldini, Rome.
	1929	Equestrian statue of Simón Bolívar	MUŻA, Valletta, Malta
	c. 1932	Sorpresa / "Surprised"	MUŻA, Valletta, Malta
	mid-1930s	Disaster of a Submarine	
	1936	Bust of Queen Sophie of Greece	MUŻA, Valletta, Malta / Hermitage Museum, St.Petersburg, Russia
	1936	Madonna Protecting Navigators	
	1936	Madonna Protecting Aviators	
	1937	Speed	MUŻA, Valletta, Malta
	1937	"Dangerous Sport"	Hermitage Museum, St.Petersburg, Russia
	1942	Statue of Grandmaster Pinto	MUŻA, Valletta, Malta
	1945 [Debono: 1947]	Monument to Lord Gerald Strickland	Upper Barrakka Gardens, Valletta, Malta
	?	Arab Horses (plaster)	MUŻA, Valletta, Malta
	?	Equestrian statue of King George V (plaster)	MUŻA, Valletta, Malta

== Notes ==
1. This article is largely based on Claude Busuttil 1997 – most of the facts have been compared and summarized.
2. Among other works, he also accomplished the mural paintings in St Paul's church in Valletta.
