= List of monuments in Birgu =

This is a list of monuments in Birgu, Malta, which are listed on the National Inventory of the Cultural Property of the Maltese Islands.

== List ==
| Name of object | Location | Coordinates | ID | Photo | Upload |
|---|---|---|---|---|---|
| Couvre Porte Barracks | Triq it-8 ta' Dicembru | 35°53′08″N 14°31′21″E | 00049 | Couvre Porte Barracks | Upload Photo |
| Niche of the Madonna of Mount Carmel | Triq il-Karmnu / Triq San Lawrenz | 35°53′19″N 14°31′14″E | 00705 | Niche of the Madonna of Mount Carmel | Upload Photo |
| Church of the Madonna of Monserrat | Triq il-Madonna ta' Monserrat | 35°53′21″N 14°31′14″E | 00706 | Church of the Madonna of Monserrat | Upload Photo |
| Monastery of Saint Scholastika | Triq Santa Skolastika | 35°53′20″N 14°31′20″E | 00707 | Monastery of Saint Scholastika | Upload Photo |
| Niche of the Crucified Christ | Misrah ir-Rebha / Triq La Vallette | 35°53′18″N 14°31′19″E | 00708 | Niche of the Crucified Christ | Upload Photo |
| Niche of St. Philip Neri | Triq San Filippu / Triq Patri Indri Vella | 35°53′18″N 14°31′18″E | 00709 | Niche of St. Philip Neri | Upload Photo |
| Church of the Madonna of the Guardian Angels | Triq San Filippu | 35°53′19″N 14°31′18″E | 00710 | Church of the Madonna of the Guardian Angels | Upload Photo |
| Statue of St. Lawrence | Misrah ir-Rebha | 35°53′17″N 14°31′20″E | 00711 | Statue of St. Lawrence | Upload Photo |
| Oratory of the Fraternity of St. Joseph | Zuntier | 35°53′16″N 14°31′18″E | 00712 | Oratory of the Fraternity of St. Joseph | Upload Photo |
| Oratory of the Fraternity of the Crucifix | Zuntier | 35°53′16″N 14°31′17″E | 00713 | Oratory of the Fraternity of the Crucifix | Upload Photo |
| Parish Church of St. Lawrence Martyr | Triq San Lawrenz | 35°53′14″N 14°31′17″E | 00714 | Parish Church of St. Lawrence Martyr | Upload Photo |
| Church of the Annunciation | Triq il-Mina l-Kbira | 35°53′13″N 14°31′20″E | 00715 | Church of the Annunciation | Upload Photo |
| Houses of the Conventual Chaplains | Triq Papa Alessandru VII | 35°53′14″N 14°31′23″E | 00716 | Houses of the Conventual Chaplains | Upload Photo |
| Palace of the Bishop | Triq il-Palazz ta' L-Isqof | 35°53′14″N 14°31′24″E | 00717 | Palace of the Bishop | Upload Photo |
| Niche of St. Lawrence | 15 Triq il-Kwartier | 35°53′17″N 14°31′26″E | 00718 | Niche of St. Lawrence | Upload Photo |
| Niche of St Joseph | Triq Gilormu Cassar / Triq Hilda Tabone | 35°53′18″N 14°31′24″E | 00719 | Niche of St Joseph | Upload Photo |
| Niche of St. Lawrence | Triq Hilda Tabone / Triq il-Majjistral | 35°53′18″N 14°31′21″E | 00720 | Niche of St. Lawrence | Upload Photo |
| Niche of the Madonna of Sorrows | Triq il-Majjistral | 35°53′17″N 14°31′22″E | 00721 | Niche of the Madonna of Sorrows | Upload Photo |
| Niche of the Madonna of the Rosary | Triq il-Majjistral / Triq Pacifiku Scicluna | 35°53′16″N 14°31′23″E | 00722 | Niche of the Madonna of the Rosary | Upload Photo |
| Niche of St. Dominic | Triq P. Boffa | 35°53′10″N 14°31′22″E | 00723 | Niche of St. Dominic | Upload Photo |
| Niche of the Madonna of Sorrows | Taht il-Mina ta' Provence | 35°53′09″N 14°31′22″E | 00724 | Niche of the Madonna of Sorrows | Upload Photo |
| Niche of the Crucified Christ | Couvre Porte | 35°53′08″N 14°31′21″E | 00725 | Niche of the Crucified Christ | Upload Photo |
| Niche of the Face of Christ | Triq 8-ta'Dicembru (ditch) | 35°53′08″N 14°31′20″E | 00726 | Niche of the Face of Christ | Upload Photo |
| Inquisitor's Palace | Triq il-Mina l-Kbira | 35°53′14″N 14°31′21″E | 01157 | Inquisitor's Palace | Upload Photo |
| Auberge de France | 24-27 Triq Hilda Tabone | 35°53′19″N 14°31′22″E | 01158 | Auberge de France | Upload Photo |
| Auberge d' Allemagne | 7a/7b Misrah ir-Rebha | 35°53′17″N 14°31′20″E | 01159 | Auberge d' Allemagne | Upload Photo |
| Auberge d' Angleterre | 40-42 Triq il-Majjistral | 35°53′18″N 14°31′21″E | 01160 | Auberge d' Angleterre | Upload Photo |
| Auberge d' Aragon | 28-30 Triq Hilda Tabone | 35°53′19″N 14°31′23″E | 01161 | Auberge d' Aragon | Upload Photo |
| Auberge d' Auvergne et Provence | 21-23 Triq Hilda Tabone | 35°53′19″N 14°31′22″E | 01162 | Auberge d' Auvergne et Provence | Upload Photo |
| Auberge de Castille et Portugal (leon) | 57-59 Triq Hilda Tabone / Triq Gilormu Cassar | 35°53′18″N 14°31′24″E | 01163 | Auberge de Castille et Portugal (leon) | Upload Photo |
| Auberge d'Italie | 1 Triq San Lawrenz | 35°53′26″N 14°31′11″E | 01164 | Auberge d'Italie | Upload Photo |
| Fort St Angelo | Xatt il-Forn | 35°53′33″N 14°31′05″E | 01479 | Fort St Angelo | Upload Photo |
| D' Homedes Bastion - Fort St Angelo | Sant'Anglu | 35°53′27″N 14°31′09″E | 01480 | D' Homedes Bastion - Fort St Angelo | Upload Photo |
| Cavalier - Fort St Angelo | Sant'Anglu | 35°53′30″N 14°31′08″E | 01481 | Cavalier - Fort St Angelo | Upload Photo |
| Curtain wall adjoining D'Homedes Bastion - Fort St Angelo | Sant'Anglu | 35°53′29″N 14°31′07″E | 01482 | Curtain wall adjoining D'Homedes Bastion - Fort St Angelo | Upload Photo |
| Main Gateway - Fort St Angelo | Sant'Anglu | 35°53′29″N 14°31′07″E | 01483 | Main Gateway - Fort St Angelo | Upload Photo |
| Rampart adjoining D'Homedes bastion and overlooking Moat - Fort St Angelo | Sant'Anglu | 35°53′29″N 14°31′10″E | 01484 | Rampart adjoining D'Homedes bastion and overlooking Moat - Fort St Angelo | Upload Photo |
| Main enciente along No 2 battery - Fort St Angelo | Sant'Anglu | 35°53′32″N 14°31′01″E | 01485 | Main enciente along No 2 battery - Fort St Angelo | Upload Photo |
| Sea-level (no 1) battery - Fort St Angelo | Sant'Anglu | 35°53′34″N 14°31′06″E | 01486 | Sea-level (no 1) battery - Fort St Angelo | Upload Photo |
| No. 2. Battery - Fort St Angelo | Sant'Anglu | 5°53′34″N 14°31′05″E | 01487 | No. 2. Battery - Fort St Angelo | Upload Photo |
| No. 3 Battery - Fort St Angelo | Sant'Anglu | 35°53′33″N 14°31′04″E | 01488 | No. 3 Battery - Fort St Angelo | Upload Photo |
| No. 4 Battery - Fort St Angelo | Sant'Anglu | 35°53′33″N 14°31′04″E | 01489 | No. 4 Battery - Fort St Angelo | Upload Photo |
| Castral enclosure - Fort St Angelo | Sant'Anglu | 35°53′33″N 14°31′05″E | 01490 | Castral enclosure - Fort St Angelo | Upload Photo |
| Barbican - Fort St Angelo | Sant'Anglu | 35°53′31″N 14°31′06″E | 01491 | Barbican - Fort St Angelo | Upload Photo |
| De Guiral Battery - Fort St Angelo | Sant'Anglu | 35°53′32″N 14°31′01″E | 01492 | De Guiral Battery - Fort St Angelo | Upload Photo |
| Gunpowder Magazine - Fort St Angelo | Sant'Anglu | 35°53′31″N 14°31′05″E | 01493 | Gunpowder Magazine - Fort St Angelo | Upload Photo |
| Sea-filled Moat - Fort St Angelo | Xatt Sant'Anglu | 35°53′28″N 14°31′10″E | 01494 | Sea-filled Moat - Fort St Angelo | Upload Photo |
| Entrance ramp - Fort St Angelo | Xatt Sant'Anglu | 35°53′29″N 14°31′07″E | 01495 | Entrance ramp - Fort St Angelo | Upload Photo |
| Birgu | Birgu | 35°53′17″N 14°31′19″E | 01507 | Birgu | Upload Photo |
| St John Bastion | Triq il-Mina l-Kbira | 35°53′09″N 14°31′22″E | 01508 | St John Bastion | Upload Photo |
| St John Cavalier | Triq Torri ta' San Gwann | 35°53′10″N 14°31′22″E | 01509 | St John Cavalier | Upload Photo |
| French Curtain | Triq Torri ta' San Gwann | 35°53′12″N 14°31′25″E | 01510 | French Curtain | Upload Photo |
| St James Bastion | Triq Torri ta' San Gwann | 35°53′13″N 14°31′28″E | 01511 | St James Bastion | Upload Photo |
| St James Cavalier | Triq Torri ta' San Gwann | 35°53′14″N 14°31′27″E | 01512 | St James Cavalier | Upload Photo |
| Post of Castile | Triq il-Foss | 35°53′17″N 14°31′29″E | 01513 | Post of Castile | Upload Photo |
| Hornwork of the Post of Castile | Kalkara Creek | 35°53′18″N 14°31′30″E | 01514 | Hornwork of the Post of Castile | Upload Photo |
| Retrenchment of the Post of Castile | Foss tas-Sur | 35°53′16″N 14°31′29″E | 01515 | Retrenchment of the Post of Castile | Upload Photo |
| Enceinte along Kalkara side | il-Manderagg, Santa Skolastika | 35°53′21″N 14°31′21″E | 01516 | Enceinte along Kalkara side | Upload Photo |
| Short stretch of stepped curtain wall leading down to Birgu Creek | Telghet II - Vittmi Tal-Polvrista | 35°53′09″N 14°31′20″E | 01517 | Short stretch of stepped curtain wall leading down to Birgu Creek | Upload Photo |
| Couvre Porte Counterguard | Triq 8-ta'Dicembru | 35°53′07″N 14°31′21″E | 01518 | Couvre Porte Counterguard | Upload Photo |
| Couvre Porte Gate | Triq 8-ta'Dicembru | 35°53′08″N 14°31′21″E | 01519 | Couvre Porte Gate | Upload Photo |
| Covertway | il-Foss | 35°53′09″N 14°31′25″E | 01520 | Covertway | Upload Photo |
| Main Ditch | il-Foss | 35°53′12″N 14°31′26″E | 01521 | Main Ditch | Upload Photo |
| Battery of Ditch | il-Foss | 35°53′15″N 14°31′29″E | 01522 | Battery of Ditch | Upload Photo |
| Advanced Gate | Saint John Bastiona | 35°53′09″N 14°31′21″E | 01523 | Advanced Gate | Upload Photo |
| Main Gate | Saint John Bastion | 35°53′09″N 14°31′22″E | 01524 | Main Gate | Upload Photo |
| Remains of Caponier | ditch | 35°53′11″N 14°31′26″E | 01525 | Remains of Caponier | Upload Photo |
| Cottonera Lines | Cottonera | 35°52′38″N 14°31′30″E | 01544 | Cottonera Lines | Upload Photo |
| St Laurence Demi-bastion - Cottonera Lines | il-Mandragg | 35°53′12″N 14°31′33″E | 01545 | St Laurence Demi-bastion - Cottonera Lines | Upload Photo |
| San Salvatore Curtain - Cottonera Lines | Triq Santa Liberata | 35°53′10″N 14°31′35″E | 01546 | San Salvatore Curtain - Cottonera Lines | Upload Photo |
| San Salvatore Gate - Cottonera Lines | Triq Santa Liberata | 35°53′10″N 14°31′36″E | 01547 | San Salvatore Gate - Cottonera Lines | Upload Photo |
| San Salvatore Bastion - Cottonera Lines | Triq Santa Liberata | 35°53′11″N 14°31′42″E | 01548 | San Salvatore Bastion - Cottonera Lines | Upload Photo |
| Fort San Salvatore - Cottonera Lines | San Salvatore Bastion | 35°53′10″N 14°31′40″E | 01549 | Fort San Salvatore - Cottonera Lines | Upload Photo |
| St Louis Curtain - Cottonera Lines | Triq San Dwardu | 35°53′05″N 14°31′45″E | 01550 | St Louis Curtain - Cottonera Lines | Upload Photo |
| St Louis Gate - Cottonera Lines | Triq San Dwardu | 35°53′06″N 14°31′45″E | 01551 | | Upload Photo |
| St Louis Bastion - Cottonera Lines | Triq San Dwardu | 35°53′03″N 14°31′50″E | 01552 | St Louis Bastion - Cottonera Lines | Upload Photo |
| St James Curtain - Cottonera Lines | Triq San Dwardu | 35°52′59″N 14°31′48″E | 01553 | St James Curtain - Cottonera Lines | Upload Photo |
| St James Gate - Cottonera Lines | Triq San Dwardu | 35°52′58″N 14°31′48″E | 01554 | St James Gate - Cottonera Lines | Upload Photo |
| St James Bastion - Cottonera Lines | Triq San Dwardu | 35°52′53″N 14°31′51″E | 01555 | St James Bastion - Cottonera Lines | Upload Photo |
| Notre Dame de la Grace Curtain - Cottonera Lines | Triq il-Kottonera | 35°52′48″N 14°31′45″E | 01556 | Notre Dame de la Grace Curtain - Cottonera Lines | Upload Photo |
| Notre Dame de la Grace Gate - Cottonera Lines | Triq il-Kottonera | 35°52′49″N 14°31′45″E | 01557 | Notre Dame de la Grace Gate - Cottonera Lines | Upload Photo |
| Notre Dame de la Grace Bastion - Cottonera Lines | Triq il-Kottonera | 35°52′44″N 14°31′45″E | 01558 | Notre Dame de la Grace Bastion - Cottonera Lines | Upload Photo |
| Chapel of the Nativity of the Madonna | Sant'Anglu | 35°53′31″N 14°31′06″E | 01805 | Chapel of the Nativity of the Madonna | Upload Photo |
