= List of public libraries in Malta =

This is a list of all public libraries in Malta and Gozo by locality:

== A ==
- Attard Public Library, St. Nicholas College, Hal Warda Street, Attard.

== B ==
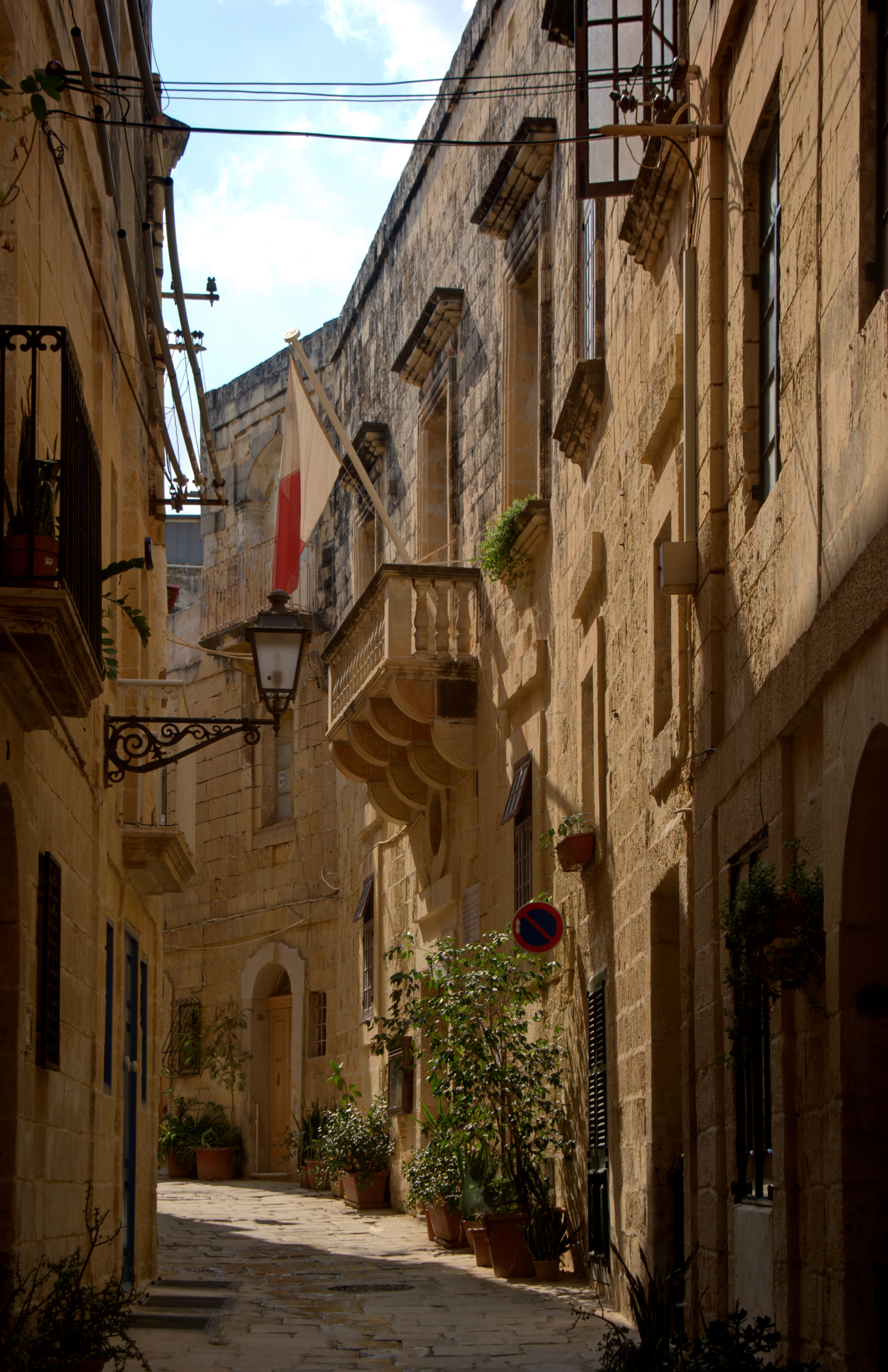
Auberge d'Angleterre

- Birgu Public Library, Auberge d'Angleterre, North West Street, Birgu.
- Birkirkara Regional Public Library, B'Kara Civic Centre, T. Fenech Street, Birkirkara.
- Birzebbugia Public Library, St. Benedict College, St. Michael Street, Birżebbuġa.
- Bormla Public Library, Oratory Street, Cospicua.

== D ==
- Dingli Public Library, St. Nicholas College, Main Street, Dingli.

== F ==
- Fgura Public Library, St. Thomas More College, Carmel Street, Fgura.

== G ==
- Gozo General Hospital Library, Tal-Ibraġ, Victoria, Gozo.
- Gudja Public Library, St. Benedict College, St. Mark Streer, Gudja.
- Gzira Public Library, Gzira Boys' Secondary School, N. Ellul Street, Gżira.

== Għ ==
- Għajnsielem Public Library, Anton Cassar Primary School, J.F. de Chambray Street, Għajnsielem, Gozo.
- Għarb Public Library, Għarb Local Council, Visitation Street, Għarb, Gozo.
- Għargħur Public Library, Maria Regina College, St. Bartholomeo Street, Għargħur.
- Għasri Public Library, Għasri Local Council, Dun K. Caruana Street, Għasri, Gozo.
- Għaxaq Public Library, Alley 1, St. Philip Street, Għaxaq.

== H ==
- Hamrun Public Library, St. George Preca College, Hamrun Primary, G. Pace Street, Ħamrun.

== K ==
- Kalkara Public Library, St. Michael Street, Kalkara.
- Kerċem Public Library, Peter Paul Grech Primary, Orvieta Square, Kerċem, Gozo.
- Kirkop Public Library, Kirkop Primary, St. Benedict Street, Kirkop.

== L ==
- Lija Public Library, Lija-Balzan Primary, R. Mifsud Bonnici Street, Lija.
- Luqa Public Library, St. Ignatius College, St. Andrew Street, Luqa.

== M ==
- Marsa Public Library, Marsa.
- Marsaxlokk Public Library, St. Thomas More College, Arznell Street, Marsaxlokk. Librarian -Carmen Scicluna
- Mellieha Public Library, Mellieha Primary School, New Mill Street, Mellieħa.
- Mgarr Public Library, Mgarr Primary, Fisher Street, Mġarr.
- Mosta Public Library, Mosta Civic Centre, Constitution Street, Mosta.
- Mqabba Public Library, Mqabba Primary, Valletta Road, Mqabba.
- Msida Public Library, Msida Local Council, Menqa Square, Msida.

== N ==
- Nadur Public Library, Dun Salv Vella Primary School, Race Course Street, Nadur, Gozo.
- Naxxar Public Library, Naxxar Civic Centre, 21 September Avenue, Naxxar.

== P ==
- Pembroke Public Library, Pembroke Local Council, Pembroke.

== Q ==
- Qala Public Library, Qala Civic Centre, Bishop Buttigieg Street, Qala, Gozo.
- Qormi San Ġorġ Public Library, Qormi St. George's Primary, F. Maempel Square, Qormi.
- Qormi St. Sebastian's Regional Library, St. Sebastian's Primary School, M. Dimech Street, Qormi.
- Qrendi Public Library, Qrendi Primary, Kurat Mizzi Street, Qrendi.

== R ==
- Rabat Regional Library, Rabat Civic Centre, Rabat.
- Raħal Ġdid Regional Library, Paola Primary, G. D'Amato Street, Paola.

== S ==
- Safi Public Library, Safi Primary, Dun G. Caruana Street, Safi.
- San Ġiljan Public Library, St. Julian's Primary, Lapsi Street, San Ġiljan.
- San Ġwann Public Library, San Ġwann Primary, School Street, San Ġwann.
- San Lawrenz Public Library, Dun Salv Portelli Primary School, Our Lady of Sorrows Street, San Lawrenz, Gozo.
- San Pawl il-Baħar Public Library, St. Paul's Bay Primary, School Street, San Pawl il-Baħar.
- Sannat Public Library, Guze' Aquilina Primary, Sannat Road, Sannat, Gozo.
- Senglea Public Library, Senglea Civic Centre, 4 September Square, Senglea.
- Siġġiewi Public Library, Siġġiewi Primary, Dr. N. Zammit Street, Siġġiewi.
- Sliema Public Library, Sliema Primary, B. Huber Street, Sliema.
- Sta. Venera Public Library, Boys' Secondary School, St. Joseph High Road, Santa Venera.
