= Oliver Starkey =

Member of the Parliament of England

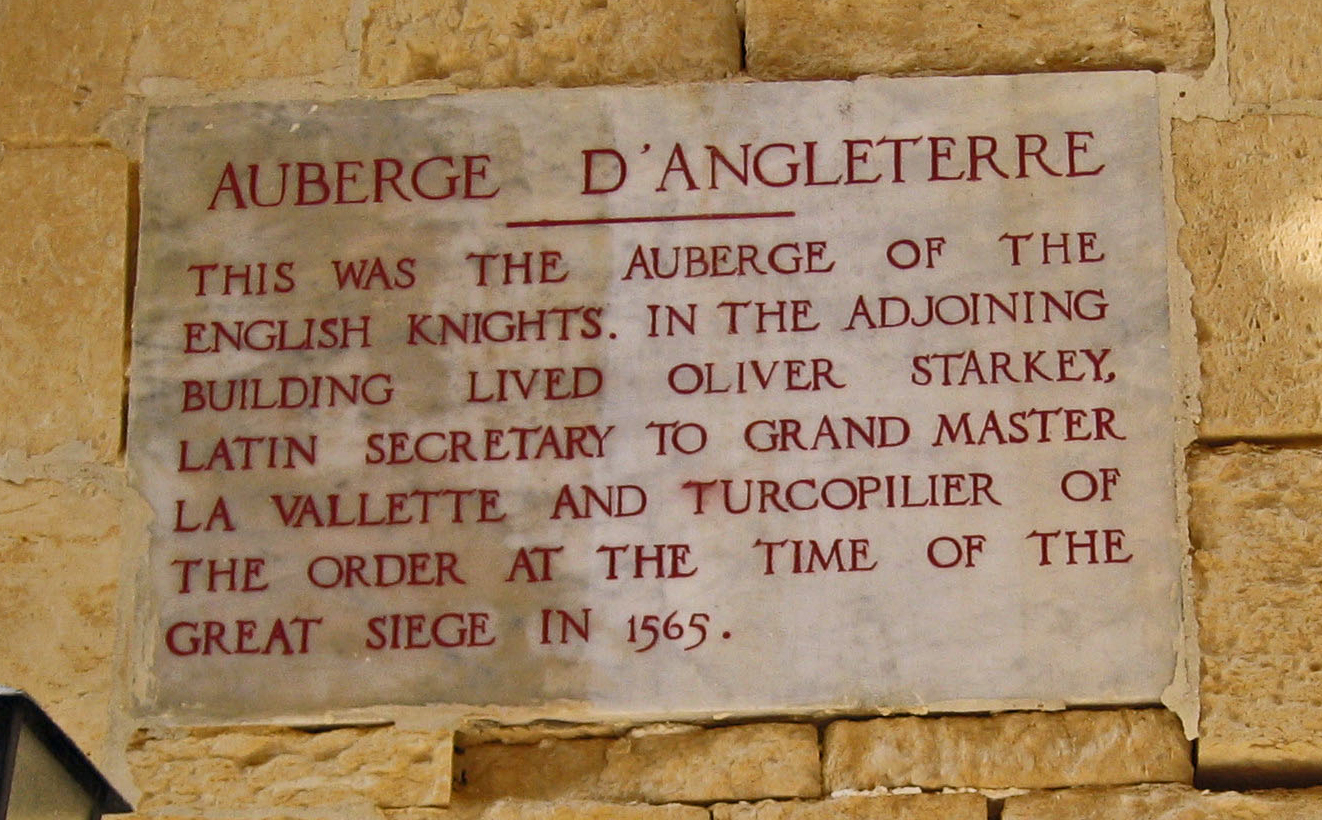
Commemorative plaque to Sir Oliver Starkey on the former English Auberge.

Sir Oliver Starkey (c.1523-1583/1586), was an English knight who lived in the 16th century. He was the only English knight present at the siege of Malta. It was wrongly assumed that he was buried in the crypt of St. John's Co-Cathedral in Valletta. The tombstone with his name on it contains only a poem written by Oliver Starkey for Grand Master Jean de La Valette. The Poem reads, in translation:'To God, Supreme, Almighty, Sacrosanct. He [La Valette] was the dread of Asia and Libya and once the guardian of Europe, after he had subdued the Turks by means of his Sacred Arms, the first one to lie buried in the grave, here in this propitious city of Valletta which he founded, worthy of eternal honour. Fra. Oliver Starkey, Pro-Turcopolier, wrote [this] poem.'

He was MP for St Alban's in April and November 1554.

== Biography ==
Oliver Starkey's' parentage is set out in the depositions of witnesses in a chancery case begun by him in 1546, soon after his father's death. He was born in Antwerp, where his father was in the service of Sir Thomas Baldry, ‘at which time the said Roger kept the mother of the said Oliver as his harlot not being at any time married together'. Although there are other possibilities the strongest evidence is that he was the illegitimate son of Hugh Starkey of the township of Oulton Lowe in the ancient Cheshire parish of Over and that he was born in the 1520s. Hugh Starkey had fought at the battle of Flodden and subsequently had connections with the court of Henry VIII.

In about 1550 Oliver Starkey was admitted to the Order of the Knights of Malta. In 1558 he was involved in the establishment of the English Langue of the Order and in November of that year was appointed as a joint proctor of the Langue. In 1560 he was elected to be Lieutenant Turcopolier of the Order. The following year he was authorised to establish an English Auberge in Birgu, and he lived in the house next door.

Starkey was involved in the siege of Malta which lasted from May to September 1565, and was the only English knight to have played a part in it. As Lieutenant Turcopolier he was responsible for a section of the coastal defences around Birgu. At the same time he was Latin Secretary to the contemporary Grand Master, Jean Parisot de la Valette. Valette died in 1568 and ten years later his remains were moved to a tomb in the crypt of the newly completed co-cathedral of St John. Starkey composed the Latin inscription on his tomb. In 1569 he was appointed Bailiff of Eagle, the fourth highest dignity in the English Langue and in 1578 he was made Grand Prior of the Order of St. John in England. He continued to carry out further duties for the Order, serving under a total of four Grand Masters, until he died in the spring of 1588.

He was also commander of Quenington, Gloucestershire which the position was given to him by Cardinal Pole.

== See also ==
- List of the priors of St John of Jerusalem in England
