= Fortifications of Birgu =

- Is-Swar tal-Birgu
- Birgu, Malta
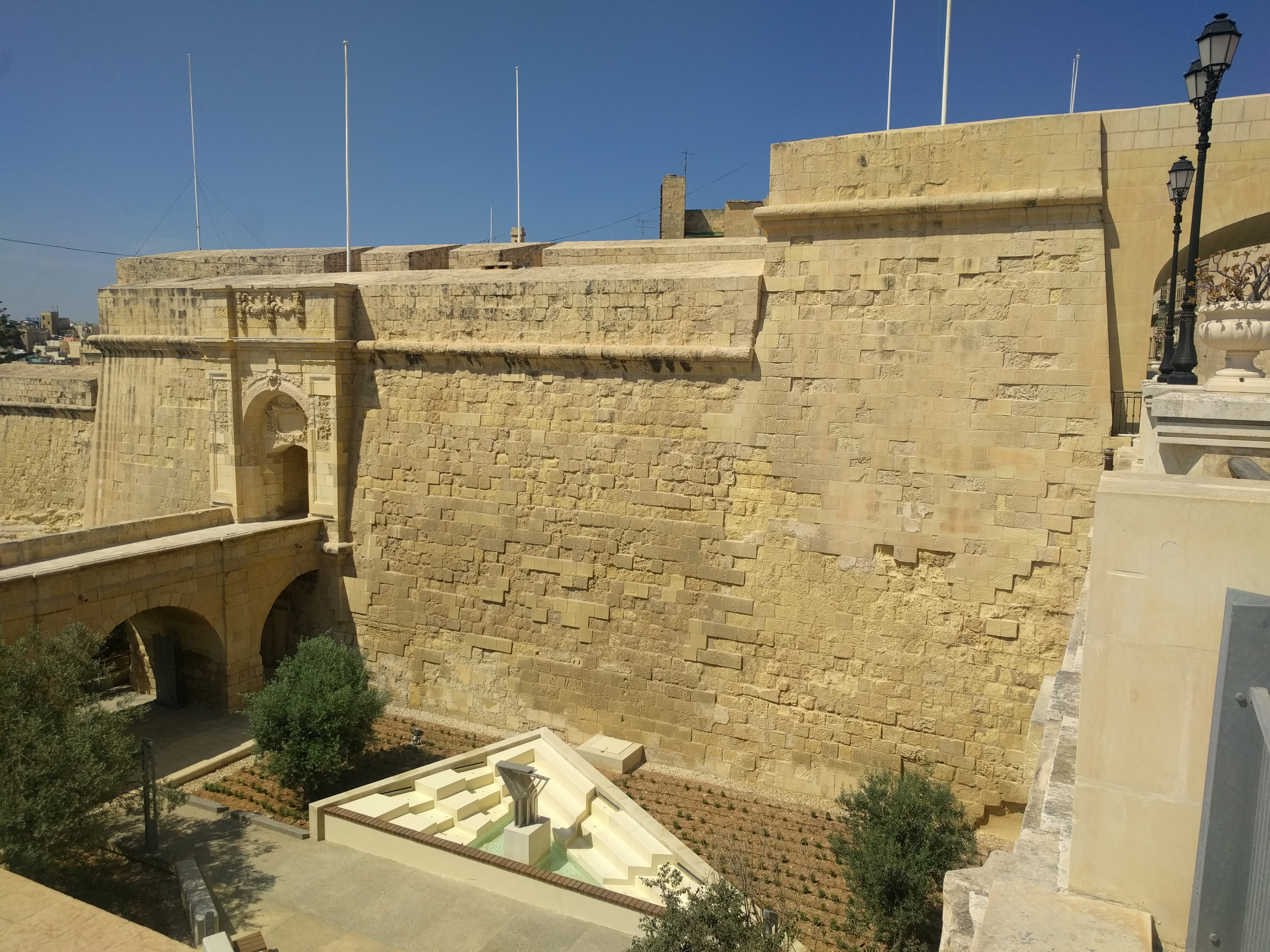
- St. John Bastion and the Advanced Gate

Site information
- Type: City wall
- Owner: Government of Malta
- Condition: Mostly intact

Location
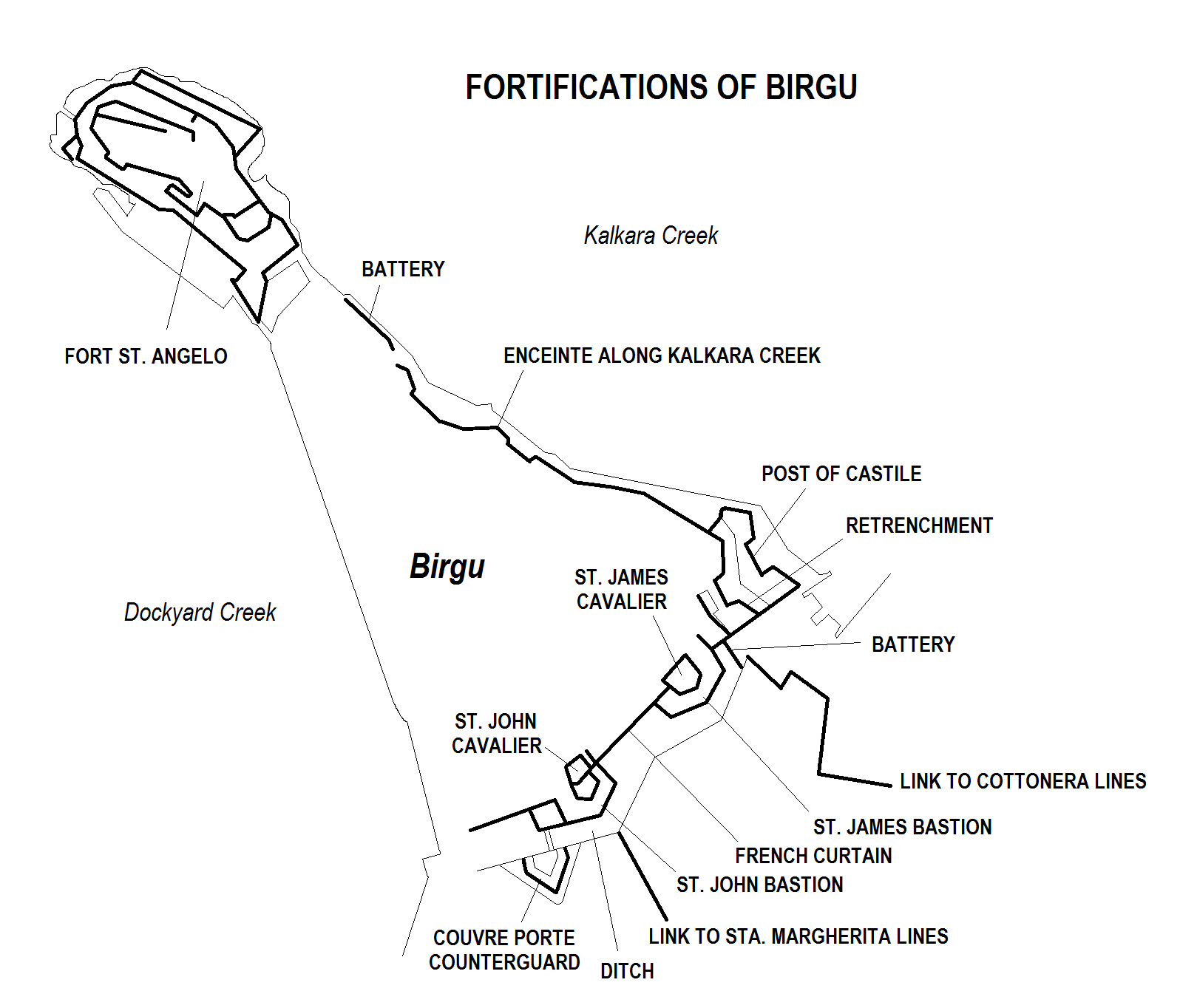
- Map of Birgu's fortifications
- Location within Malta
- Coordinates: 35°53′10″N 14°31′22.8″E

Site history
- Built: c. 13th century–1691 (Fort St. Angelo); 1530s–18th century (rest of city walls)
- Built by: Order of Saint John
- Materials: Limestone
- Battles/wars: Attack of 1551; Great Siege of Malta (1565); Siege of Malta (1798–1800)

Garrison information
- Past commanders: Jean de Valette (1565)

The fortifications of Birgu (Maltese: Is-Swar tal-Birgu) are a series of defensive walls and other fortifications which surround the city of Birgu, Malta. The first fortification to be built was Fort Saint Angelo in the Middle Ages, and the majority of the fortifications were built between the 16th and 18th centuries by the Order of Saint John. Most of the fortifications remain largely intact today.

Birgu's fortifications have been on Malta's tentative list of UNESCO World Heritage Sites since 1998, as part of the Knights' Fortifications around the Harbours of Malta. They are also listed as monuments in Birgu as part the National Inventory of the Cultural Property of the Maltese Islands (NICPMI).

== History ==
=== Hospitaller rule ===
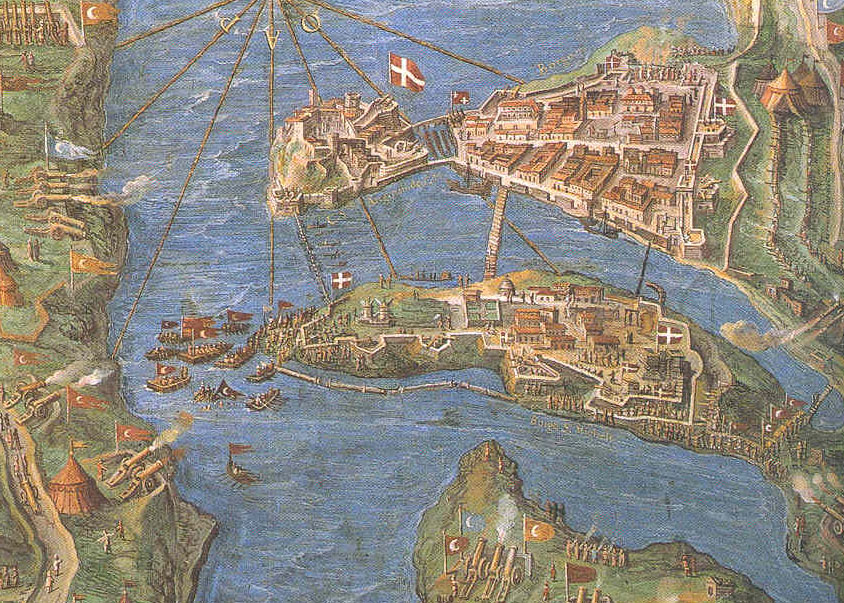
Map of Birgu (top) and Senglea (bottom) during the Great Siege of Malta

The first fortification to be built in Birgu was the Castrum Maris. It is popularly attributed to have been built by the Arabs in around 870, but the earliest references to the castle date back to around the 13th century.

In 1526, the Order of Saint John sent a commission of 8 knights to inspect the island of Malta, which had been offered to them by Emperor Charles V as a potential base following their loss of Rhodes. They described Birgu as a small defenceless town, with its only fortification being the obsolete and partially ruined Castrum Maris.

The Order eventually moved to Malta in 1530 and established itself in Birgu. The first modifications were made to the Castrum Maris, which became Fort Saint Angelo and was used as the Grand Master's residence. Later on, the entire town began to be surrounded by walls, in a similar style to the Order's earlier defences in Rhodes. Birgu's land front was built by 1540.

In 1551, Ottomans attempted to attack Birgu but turned back once they saw the new defences. They attacked again with a much larger force fourteen years later in 1565. The siege, which became known as the Great Siege of Malta, lasted for three months and Birgu was heavily bombarded. After the Great Siege, Birgu's fortifications were repaired, but soon lost most of their importance as the Order moved to its new capital Valletta, and built new fortifications there.

In the 17th and 18th centuries, the Santa Margherita Lines and the Cottonera Lines were built around Birgu's and Senglea's land fronts. These new lines increased the strength of the defensive position, but also reduced the importance of Birgu's land front. Birgu's fortifications were extensively rebuilt in the 18th century, under the direction of the architect Charles François de Mondion.

On 18 July 1806, the gunpowder magazine of Birgu exploded, killing over 200 people.

The fortifications of Birgu were included on the Antiquities List of 1925.

=== Present day ===
The first plans to restore the fortifications of Birgu were made in 2006, as part of a project that would also involve restoration of the fortifications of Valletta, Mdina and the Cittadella. Restoration of Birgu's fortifications began in January 2008, and is currently ongoing.

During the course of restoration work, a bastion that had been built just before the siege of 1565 as well as an 18th-century caponier were discovered. A 20th-century naval oil depot near the Post of Castile was demolished in 2010 to reveal the view of the bastions, and a breach in St. John Bastion was bridged by an arch the following year.

Birgu's ditch was opened to the public as a recreational area in January 2016. The recreational area includes the 18th-century caponier, which was restored and partially reconstructed, as well as the battery at the left extremity of the ditch.

== Layout ==
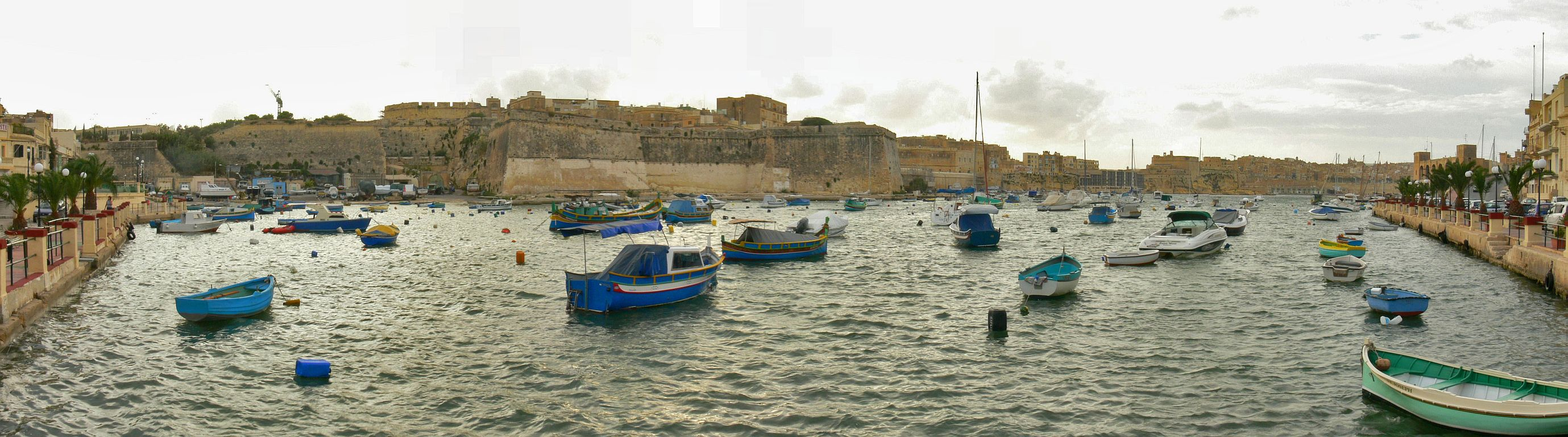
The Post of Castile as viewed from Kalkara.

The present layout of Birgu's fortifications is mainly a result of the 18th century rebuilding by the French architect Charles François de Mondion, although the general layout dates back to the mid-16th century. The fortifications consist of (listed going clockwise from Fort St. Angelo to Dockyard Creek):

- Fort Saint Angelo – a large bastioned fort, originally a castle built in or before the 13th century, modernized between the 16th and 17th centuries by the Order of Saint John. The present layout dates back to a major reconstruction by Flemish architect Carlos de Grunenbergh in the 1690s. For more details about the fort's layout, see here.
- An irregular enceinte, beginning from the moat of Fort St. Angelo and ending at the Post of Castile. Its northern end was occupied by a battery, now partially dismantled.

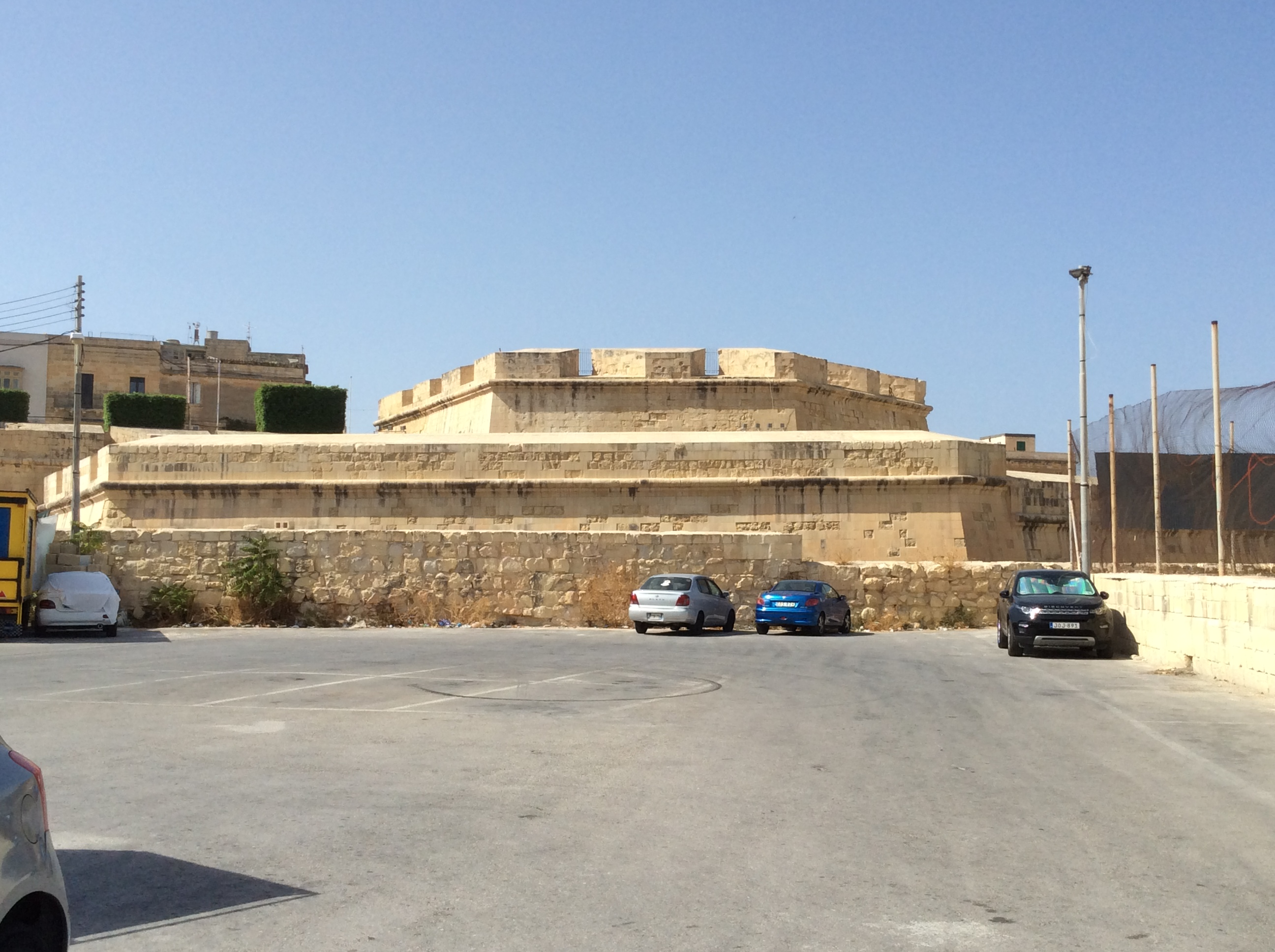
Post of Castile

- Post of Castile (Maltese: Il-Prexxa, Italian: La Breccia) – the east extremity of the Birgu Land Front. It was originally built before 1565 and played a crucial role in the Great Siege. The present layout dates back to the 18th century, and consists of a retrenchment and a hornwork.
- St. James Bastion – a two-tiered pentagonal bastion built prior to 1565 and redesigned by de Mondion in the 18th century. Part of the original 16th century bastion was rediscovered during restoration works.
  - St. James Cavalier – a small pentagonal cavalier built on St. James Bastion sometime in the 18th century.
- French Curtain – a curtain wall linking St. James and St. John Bastions.
- St. John Bastion – a large asymmetrical bastion containing two of the three main gates of Birgu, designed by de Mondion in the 18th century. A modern road passes through an arch in the bastion.
  - St. John Cavalier – a two-tiered cavalier built on St. John Bastion. It was originally built prior to 1565, but was modified in the 18th century. Minor alterations were also made by the British in the 19th century.

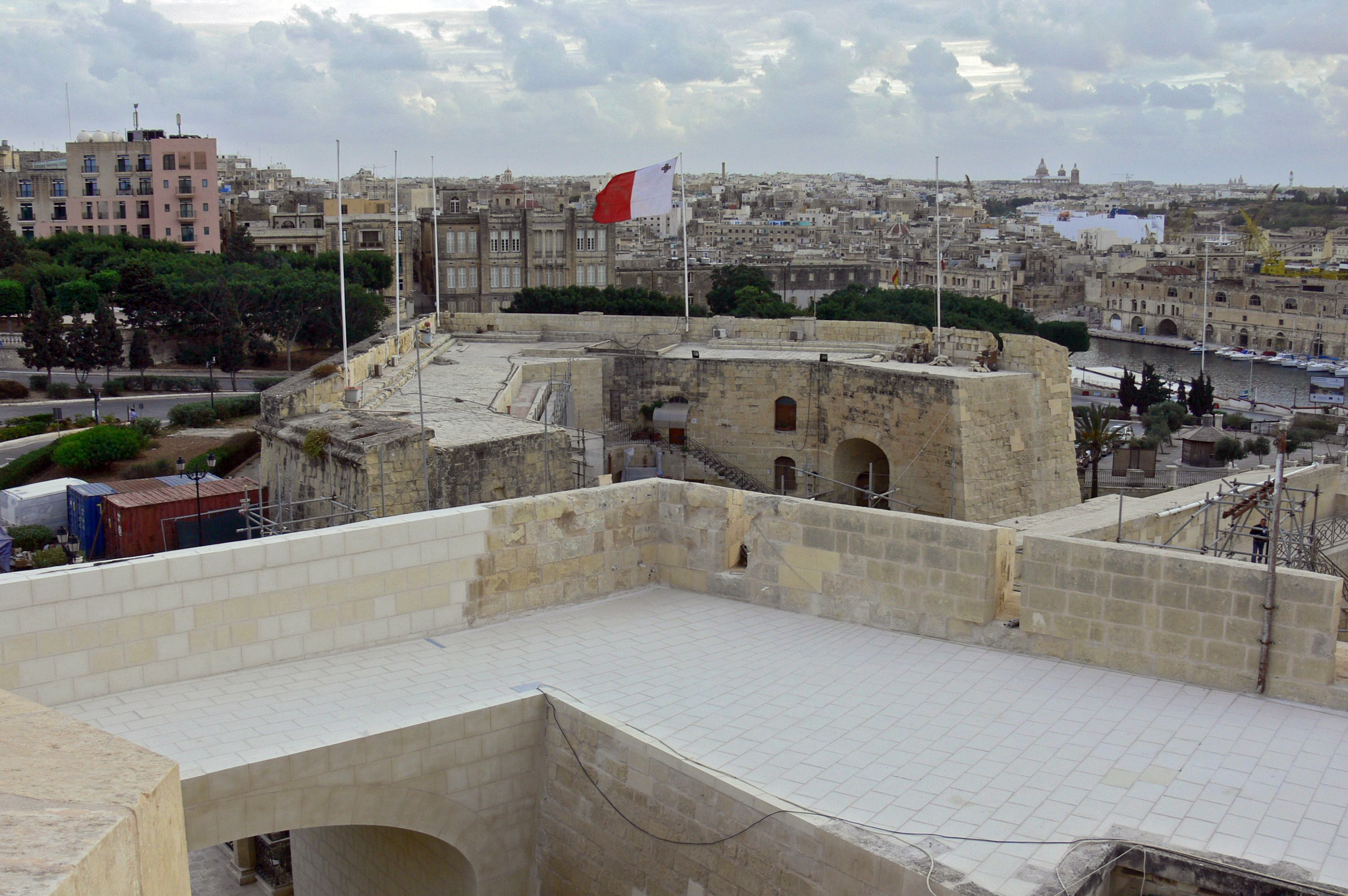
Couvre Porte Counterguard as viewed from St. John Bastion

- Couvre Porte Counterguard – a pentagonal counterguard built to protect St. John Bastion. It was built during the reign of Antoine de Paule, and was modified in the 18th and 19th centuries. The British developed its casemates into a barracks, which now houses the Malta at War Museum.
- A curtain wall linking St. John Bastion to Dockyard Creek. Originally there was a small bastion but this was destroyed in the explosion of 1806.

The entire land front is surrounded by a rock-hewn ditch, which also includes a caponier and another battery. A covertway and glacis were also located close to the land front, but were mostly cleared away in the 19th century.

Birgu had four city gates, three of which still survive. They were designed by Charles François de Mondion in the 18th century, and are in the Baroque style:

- Couvre Porte Gate – the first of the three main gates, located within the west side of Couvre Porte Counterguard.
- Advanced Gate – the second of the three main gates, located on the right face of St. John Bastion.
- Gate of Provence – the third and last of the three main gates, located on the inner flank of St. John Bastion.
- Porta Marina – a gate located on the western extremity of Birgu. It was destroyed in the explosion of 1806.
Gates of Birgu
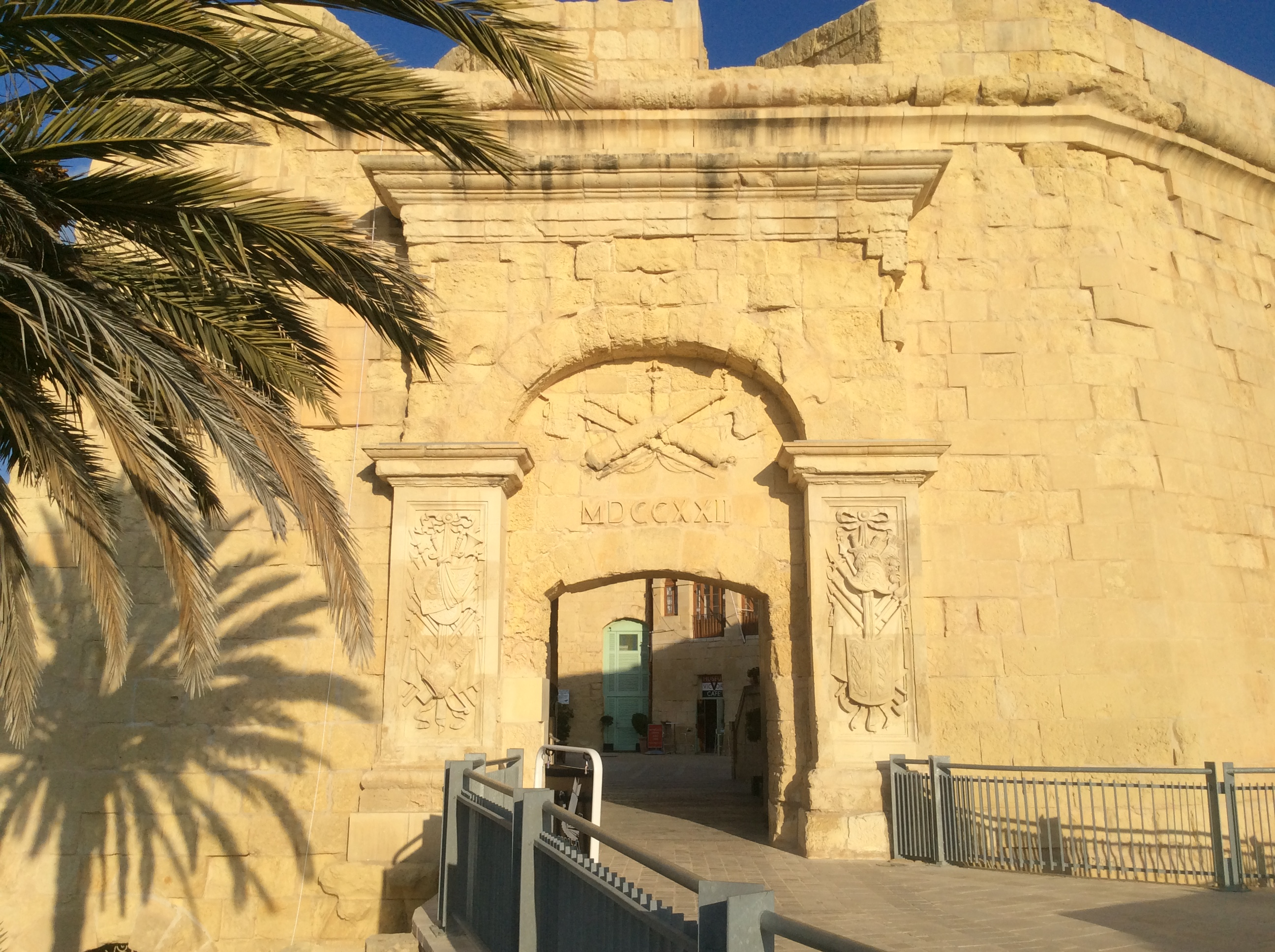
Couvre Porte Gate

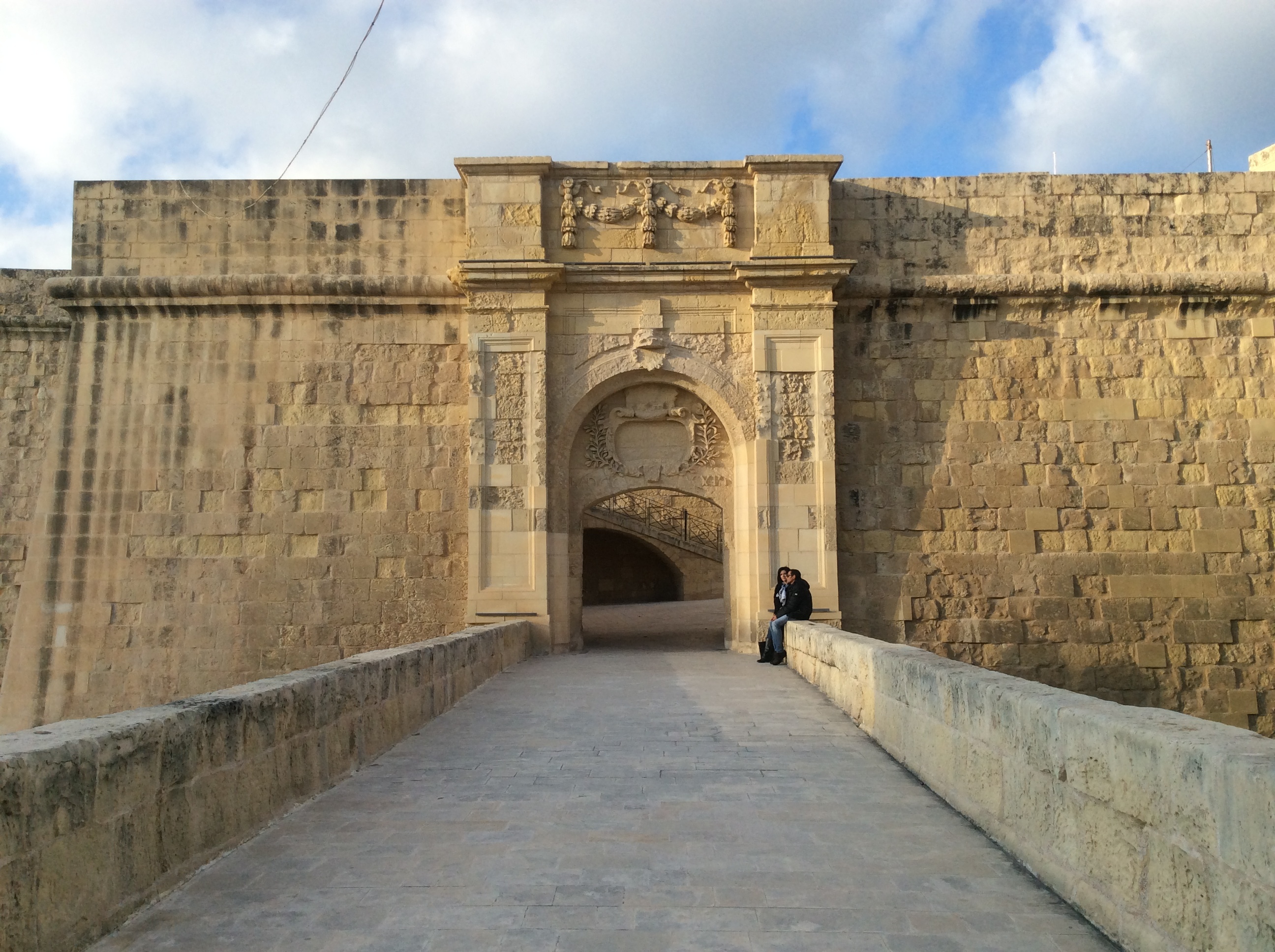
Advanced Gate

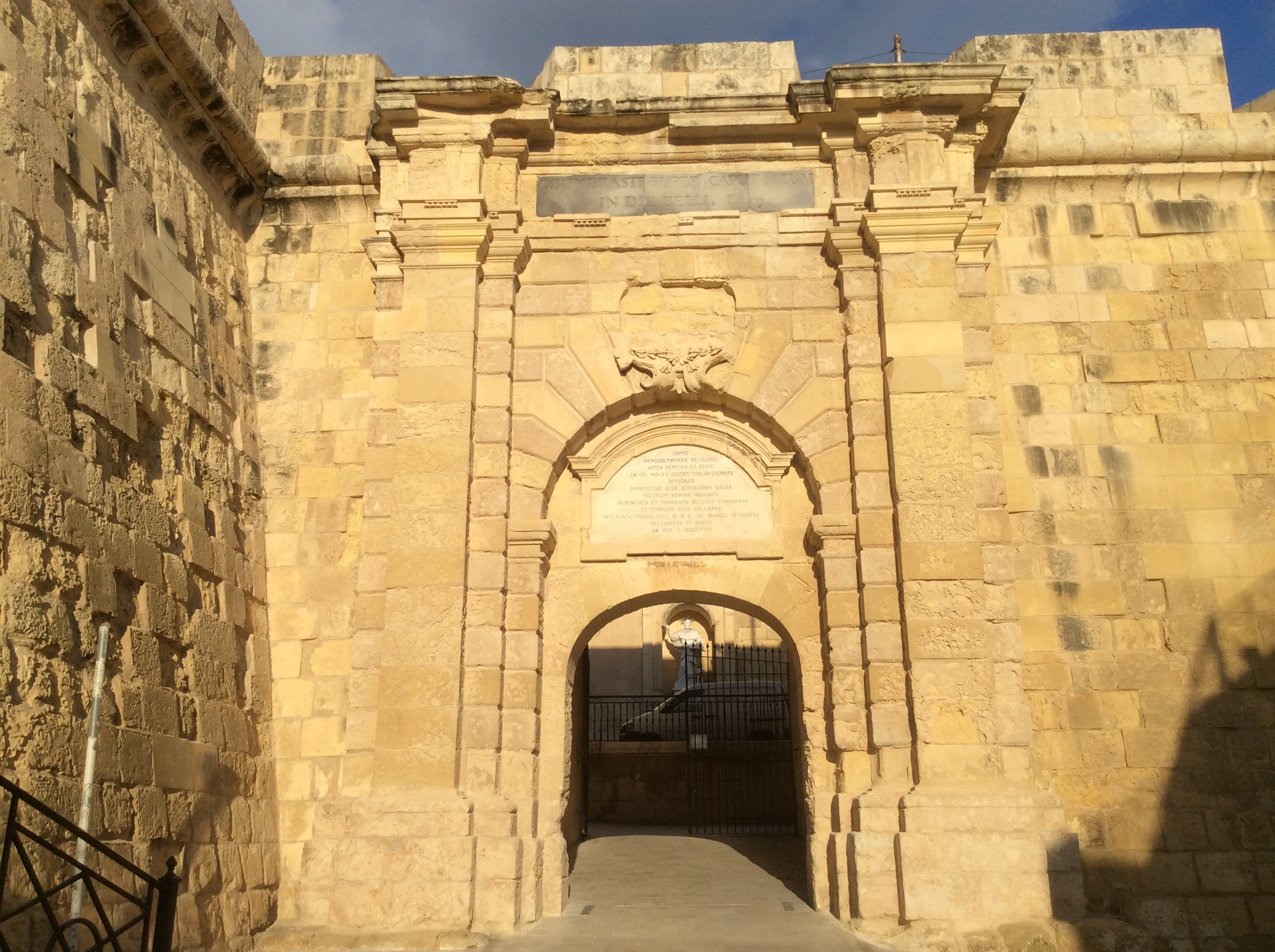
Gate of Provence

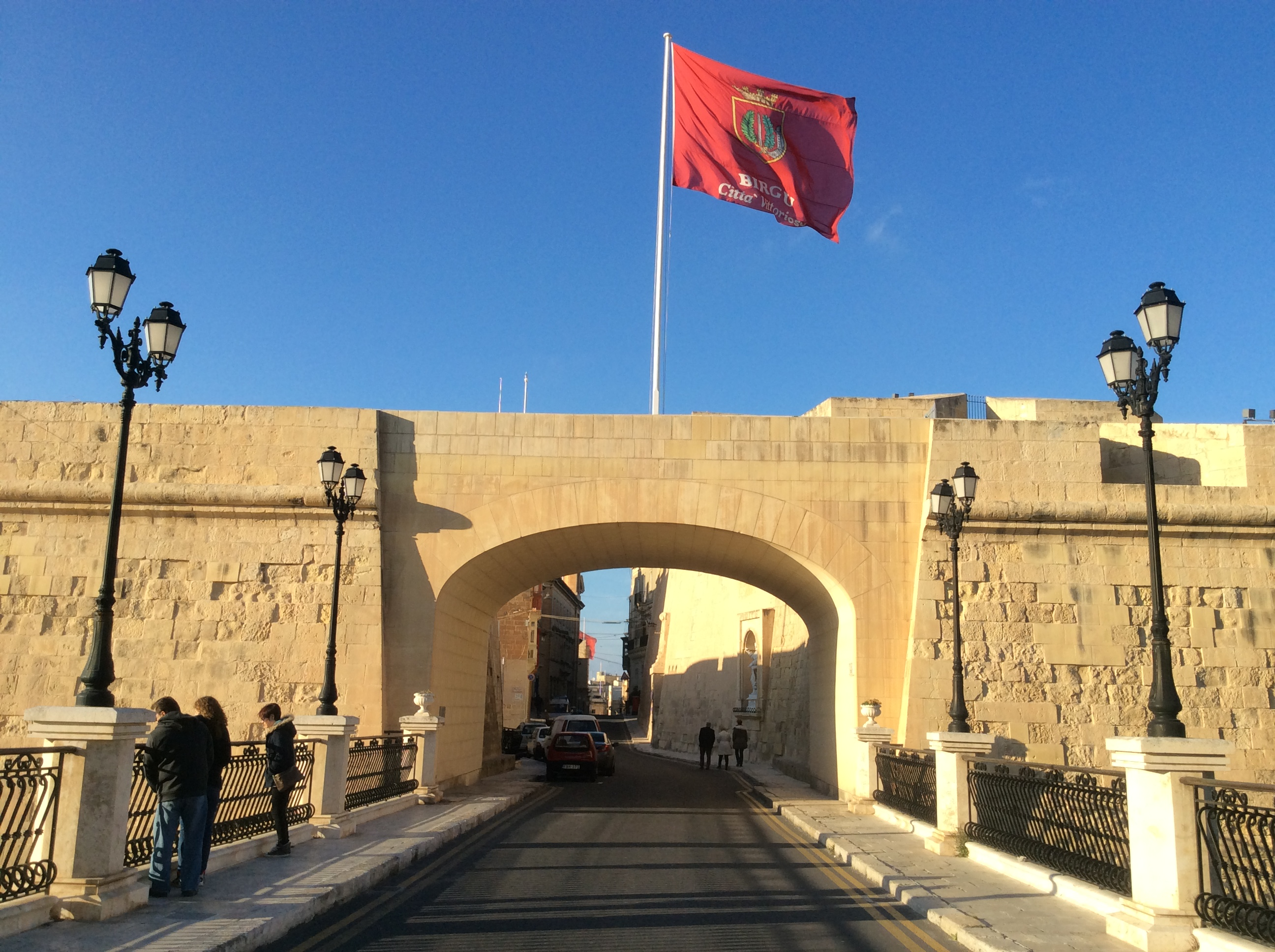
Modern arched opening in St. John Bastion

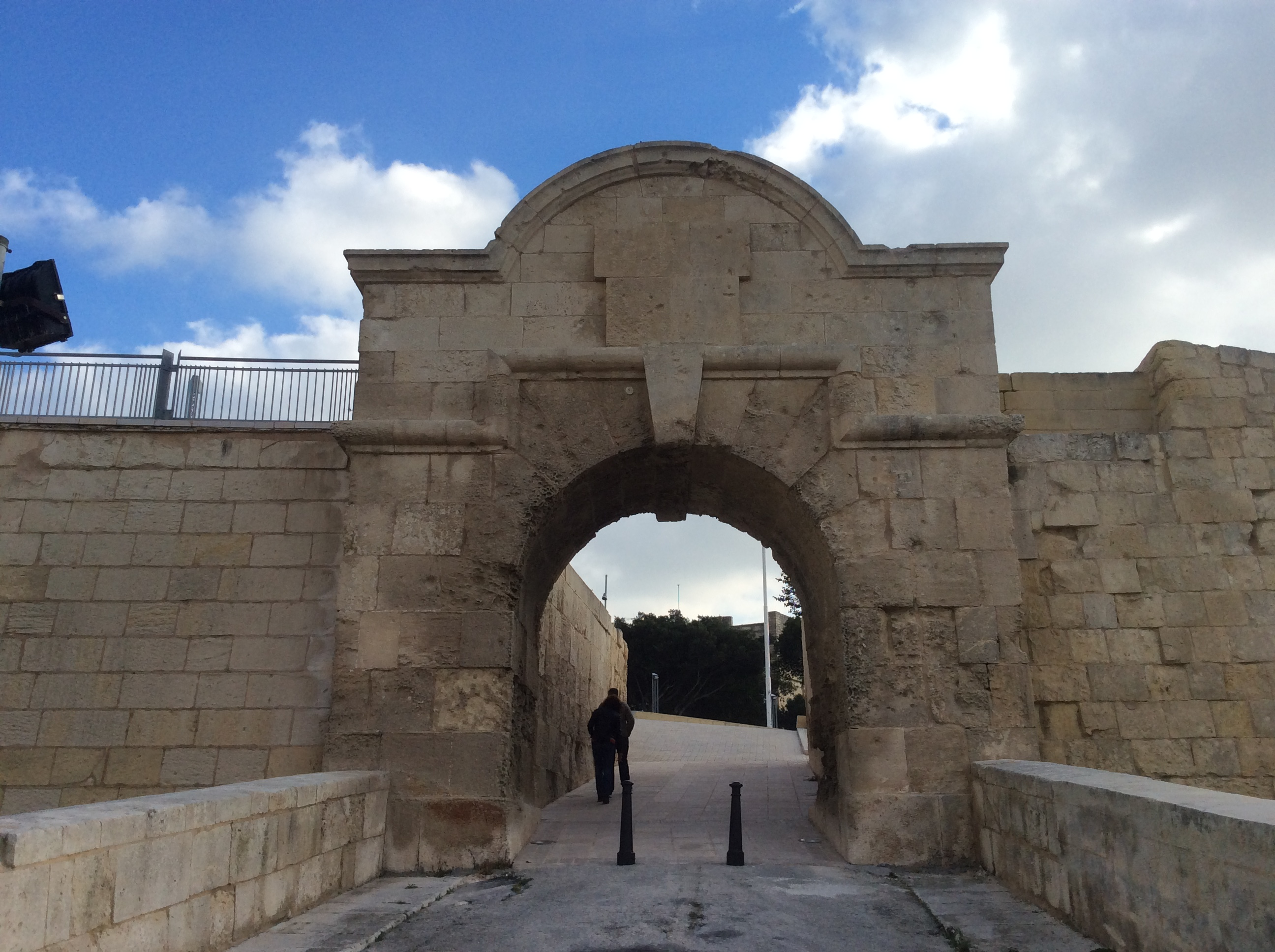
Outer gate originally leading to the now-demolished Porta Marina
