= Auberge de Provence =

- Berġa ta' Provenza
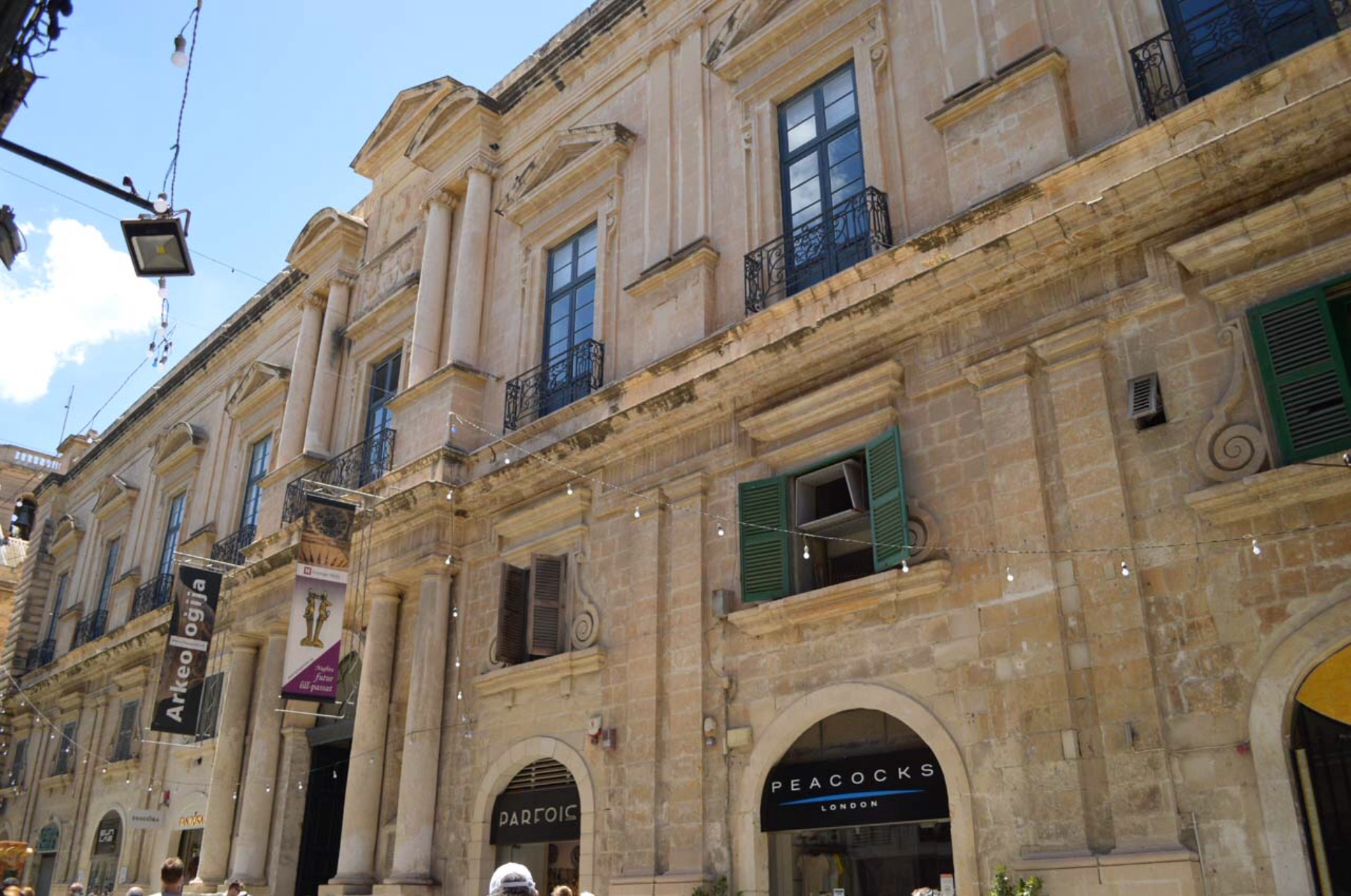
- Façade of Auberge de Provence
- Interactive map of the Auberge de Provence area

General information
- Status: Intact
- Type: Auberge
- Architectural style: Mannerist
- Location: Valletta, Malta
- Coordinates: 35°53′51″N 14°30′45″E
- Current tenants: National Museum of Archaeology
- Construction started: 1570s
- Renovated: 1638
- Owner: Government of Malta

Technical details
- Material: Limestone
- Floor count: 2

Design and construction
- Architect: Girolamo Cassar

Renovating team
- Architect: Mederico Blondel

Auberge de Provence (Maltese: Berġa ta' Provenza) is an auberge in Valletta, Malta. It was built in the sixteenth century to house knights of the Order of Saint John from the langue of Provence. It now houses the National Museum of Archaeology.

== The first auberge ==
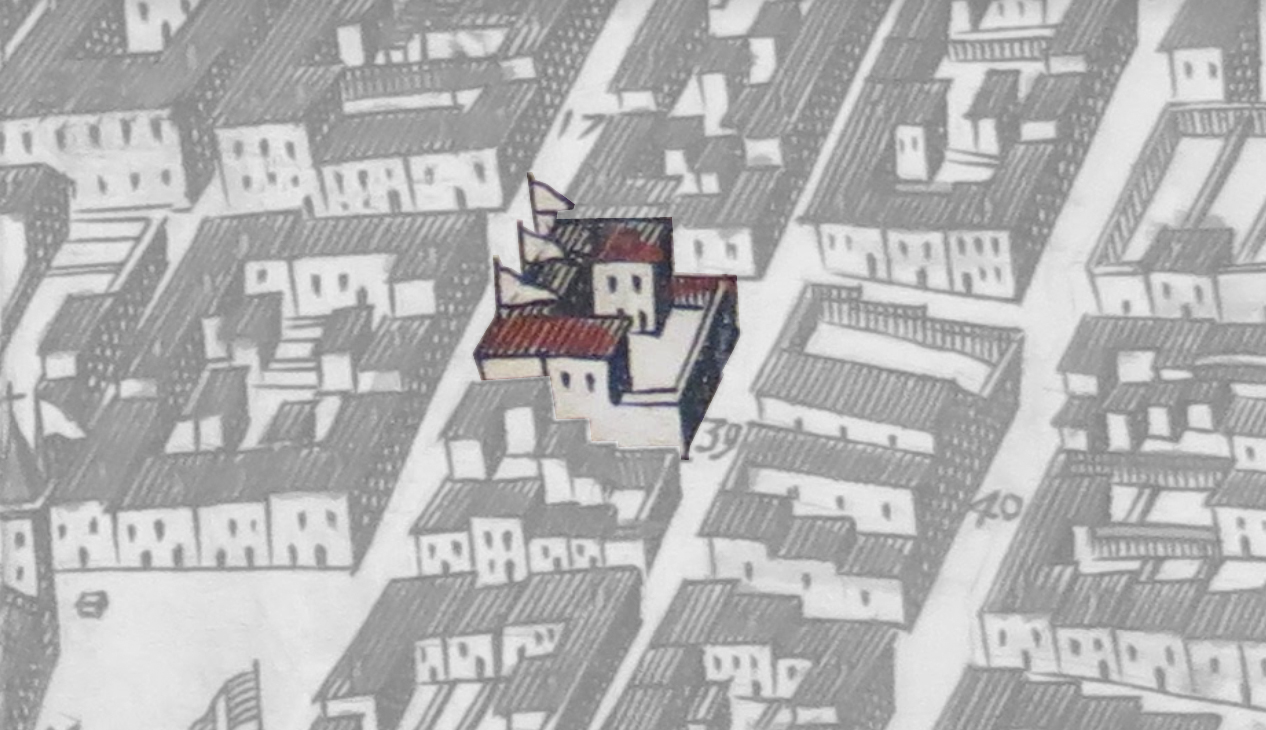
Detail of Auberge de Provence as represented in seventeenth century map

Auberge de Provence started being built between 1571 and 1574 under the direction of the Maltese architect Girolamo Cassar. Prior to its construction, the Langue of Provence had been housed in the Auberge d'Auvergne et Provence in Birgu.

The first auberge was built in an Italianate style, with the building surrounding three sides of a yard and garden, and with an open loggiato (covered exterior gallery) and passegiatoia (open balcony) around the courtyard connecting all the wings of the building. The ceremonial halls and common rooms overlooked Strada San Giorgio (now Republic Street) while the habitation quarters of the new Knights overlooked Strada Pia (now Melita Street). The wing overlooking Strada Carri (now Cart Street) housed the quarters of the Bailiff who was in charge of the Langue. The building was furnished with a kitchen, oven, slaughter house and stables. In 1584, the Langue decided to build a first floor above the existing auberge.

== The seventeenth and eighteenth century alterations ==
By the 1630s, the Langue of Provence had decided to reconstruct the auberge and works were on course to demolish parts of the building. The old façade was to make way for a new one which included spaces for shopfronts, as was the trend in the Baroque Period. The creation of new commercial spaces coincided with a period in which the Order was striving to commercialise public spaces and create revenue streams.

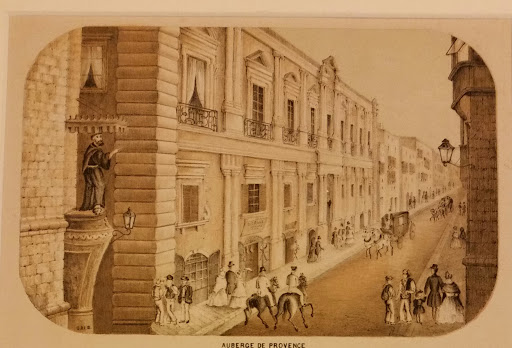
Early nineteenth century version of lithograph print representing the Auberge de Provence

During this time, the garden of the auberge was reduced in size with the sale to third parties of the two plots on Strait Street. The architect behind the project and the design of the new façade was Captain Antonio Garsin. The design of the new façade was a clear proponent of the French classical style. The creation of street-level shop fronts also changed the dynamics of the use of the building. The common areas and halls used by the Knights where now relocated to the first and second floor of the building. It was also during this period that the Gran Salon took shape.

By 1788, in the context of the financial turmoil caused by the French Revolution, the Langue had to sell the surviving stretch of garden accessible from Strait Street to generate some revenue. The architect chosen to undertake this project was Stefano Ittar. With the arrival of the French in 1798, the building's function as an Auberge came to an end. The building was converted by the occupying French into apartments for the officers of the “reggimento dei cacciatori” and their families.

== The Union Club alterations ==
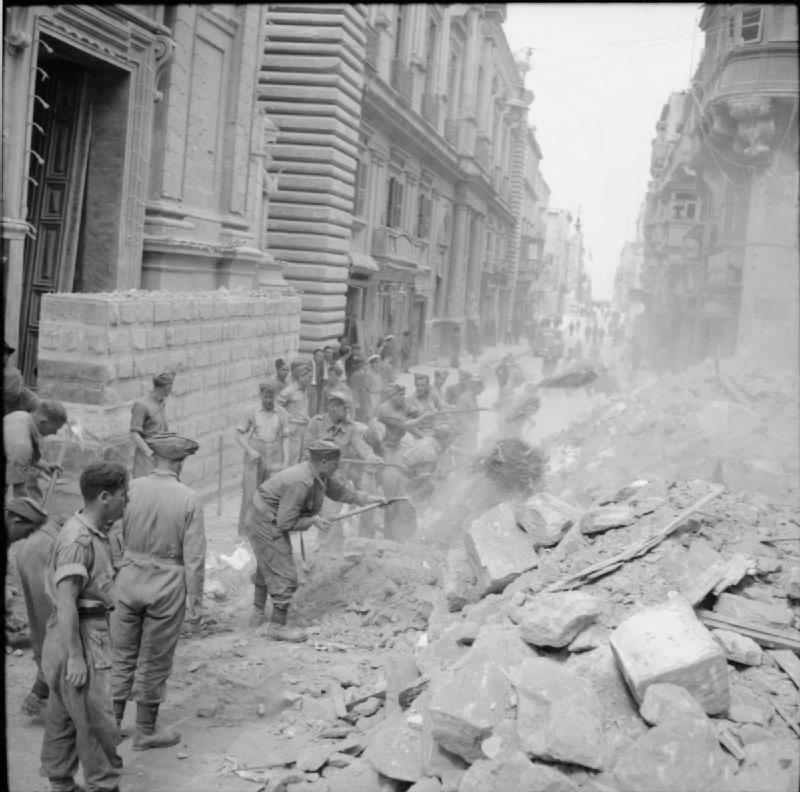
Auberge de Provence surrounded by rubble from bombed buildings, 11 May 1942.

During the early British Period the former auberge was divided into multiple properties and sublet by the colonial government for various purposes. The earliest use of the building was as a military barracks, as a department for the Military Commission. It also hosted the Thorn's Hotel. The new divisions introduced residential and commercial uses, including an auction house, various shops and a social club. The frequency of structural alterations to the building steadily increased in the course of the 19th century, although they tended to be on a smaller scale and of a more contained nature.

One of the earliest interventions during this period was done by the Maltese architect Michele Cachia in 1800, who was called in to do some restoration works. In 1826, parts of the auberge were leased out to the garrison and maritime officers to serve as a social club where to hold balls and events. This came to be known as the Malta Union Club. Amongst its members the Union Club had personalities such as the writer Sir Walter Scott, British Prime Minister Benjamin Disraeli and also Prince George of Wales (afterwards King George V.

The building was included on the Antiquities List of 1925 together with the other auberges in Valletta. During World War II, buildings located close to the auberge were destroyed by aerial bombardment, but the auberge itself was not hit and only suffered minor damages. Since Auberge d'Auvergne and Auberge de France were both destroyed during the war, Auberge de Provence is the only surviving French auberge in Valletta.

On 12 August 1955, the lease to the Malta Union Club was terminated. In 1958 the auberge was opened as the National Museum, housing the Archaeological Collection on the ground floor and Fine Arts on the first floor. In 1974, the Fine Arts collection was transferred to Admiral House and the auberge became the National Museum of Archaeology. The auberge is listed on the National Inventory of the Cultural Property of the Maltese Islands.

== The Gran Salon ==
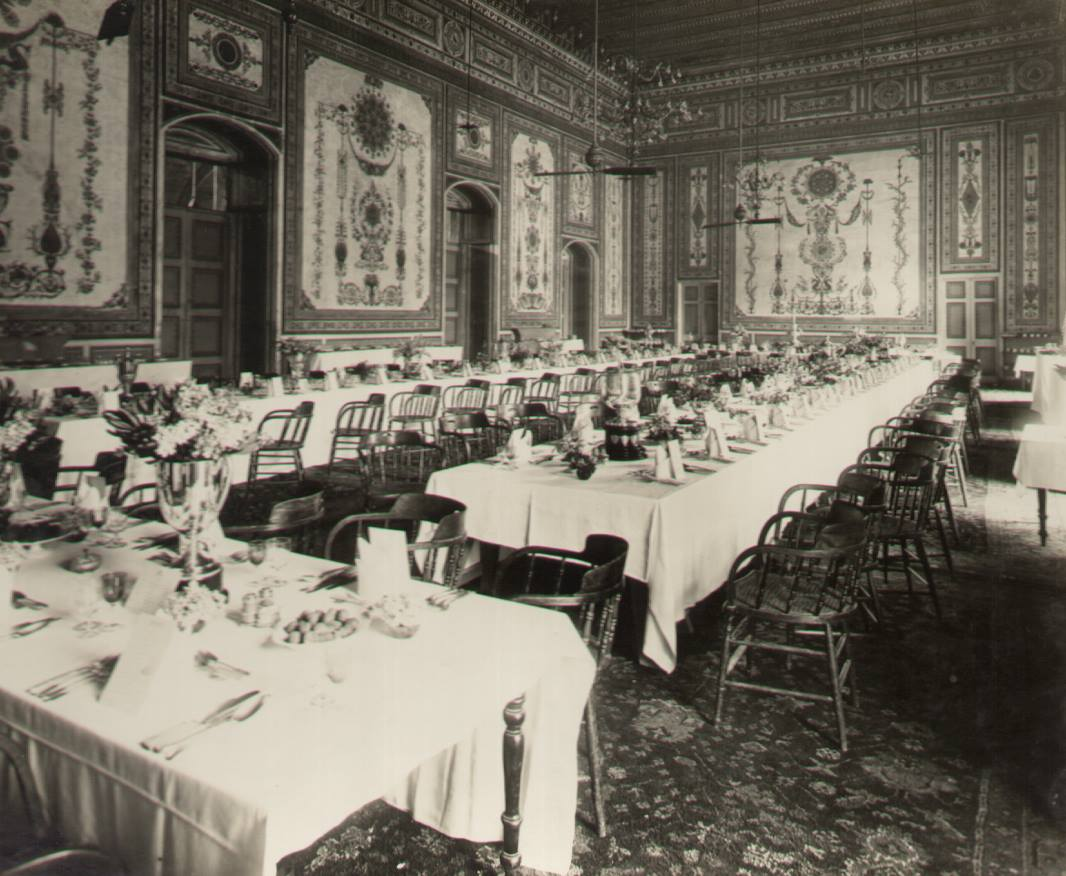
Archival image of the Gran Salon

The Gran Salon is one of the most memorable and elegant halls in the Maltese Islands. It originally served as a refectory and banqueting hall, where the Knights sat at long tables according to seniority. Under the British it served as a ball room and banqueting hall for the upper echelons of the British Colonial administration.

It is not clear when the Gran Salon was decorated. Documentary evidence has indicated that the site was already heavily painted during the Knights period. The current pictorial scheme is a later addition and is decorated in the Pompeian floral style. This current painting scheme likely dates to the British Period.

Research has established that the artist used two very particular pigments, emerald green and chrome yellow, both in the lower and central areas. These pigments help to possibly date the existing decorative scheme. The two colours are known to have been used since 1814 and 1816 respectively. Chrome yellow was only used for approximately 90 years due to its toxicity. Therefore, the wall paintings are likely to have been executed during the nineteenth century.

Ongoing conservation works have also revealed the signature and date of the artist carrying out restoration after World War II. Mr. Francis Borg was commissioned to repair the war damage, two years after the end of the war in 1947. His signature can be found on the east wall. The Conservation of the Gran Salon is partly sponsored by Bank of Valletta.

== Commemorative coins ==
In 2013, the Central Bank of Malta issued a new numismatic coin depicting the Auberge de Provence. The obverse of the coin shows the emblem of Malta with the year of issue, 2013. The reverse features the façade of the Auberge de Provence.
