= Bartolommeo Genga =

Italian architect (1518–1558)

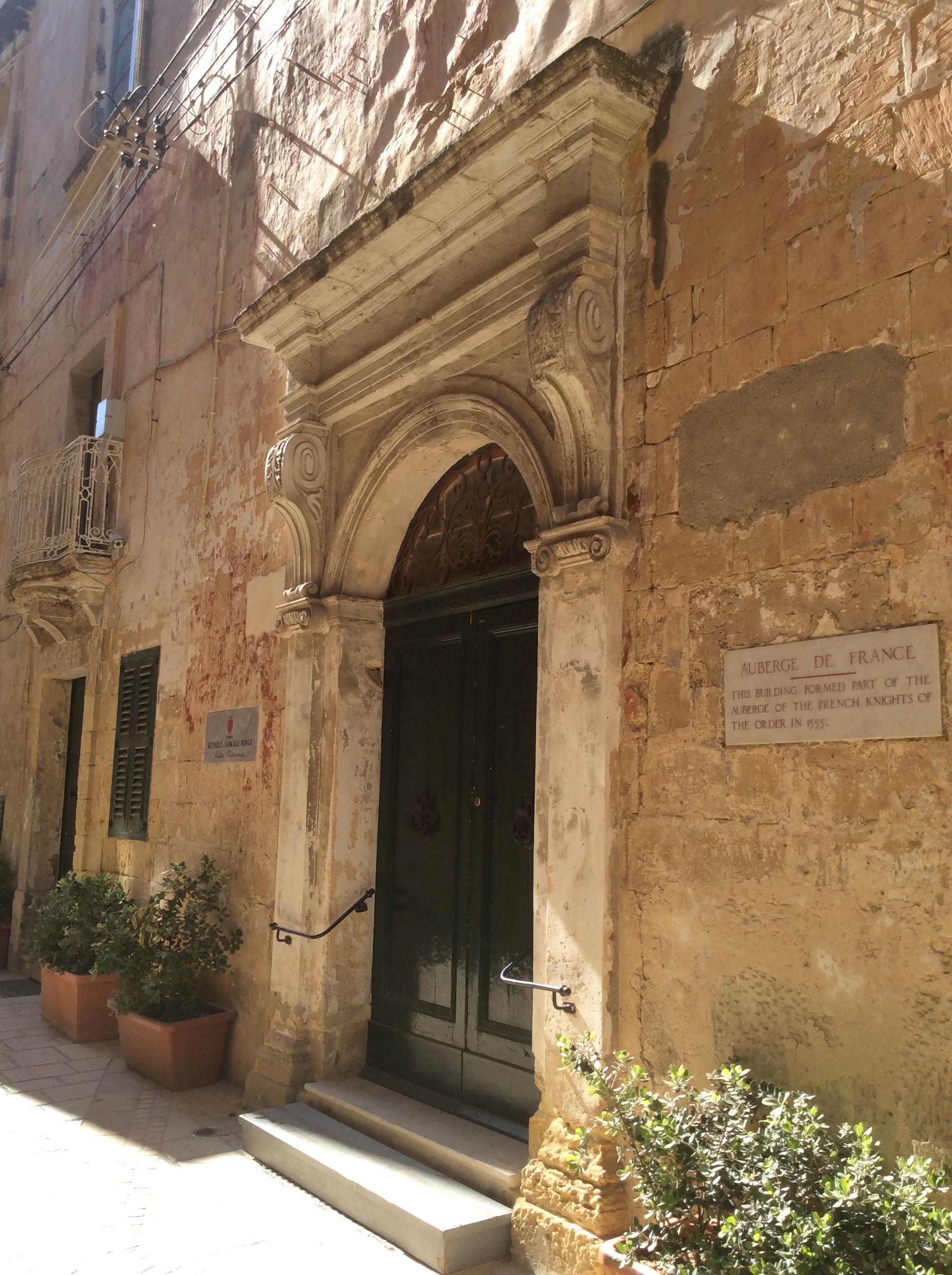
Auberge de France in Birgu, Malta, whose façade was redesigned by Genga

Bartolommeo Genga (1518–1558) was an Italian architect who was born in Cesena, Italy. He was the son of Girolamo Genga (1467–1551) and the brother-in-law of Giovanni Battista Belluzzi (1506–1554). At 20 years of age, Bartolommeo went to Florence, to continue the studies he commenced with his father. In Florence, he befriended Giorgio Vasari (1511–1574) and Bartolomeo Ammanati (1511–1592). After spending three years in Florence, he returned to his father, who was then building the church of San Giovanni Battista in Pesaro. Upon the death of his father in 1551, Bartolommeo assumed his father’s position with Duke Francesco Maria I della Rovere. Bartolommeo continued the building of San Giovanni Battista and built the Palace of Pesaro.

Genga undertook major alterations to the façade of Auberge de France in Birgu, Malta. Genga was one of several architects who made preliminary sketches for a new city on Sciberras Hill. The city – now Malta's capital, Valletta – would be built a few years after his death, to designs of Francesco Laparelli. Genga died in Malta at age forty in 1558.
