= Auberge d'Allemagne, Birgu =

Auberge d'Allemagne
- Berġa ta' Alemanja
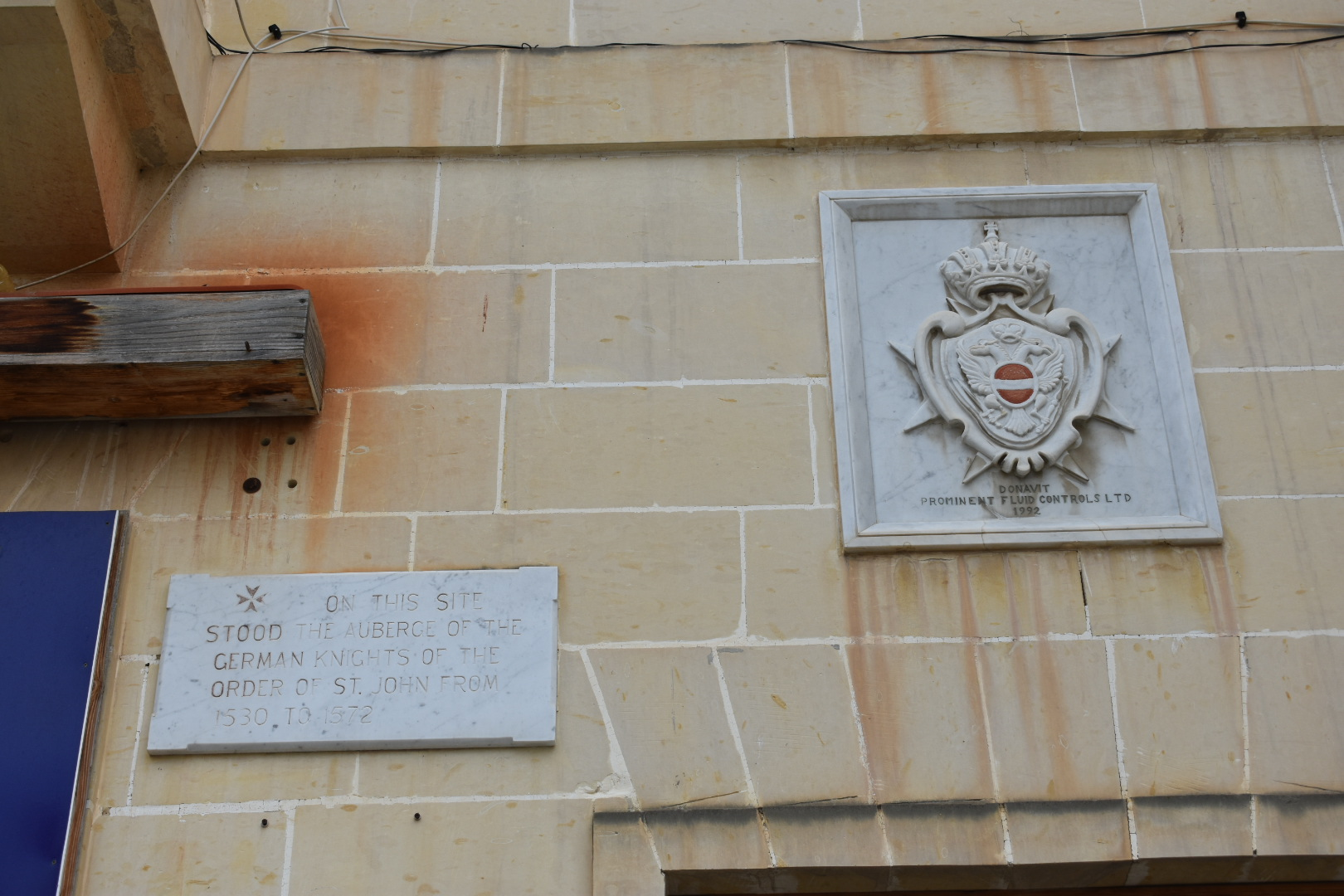
- Plaque on the modern building
- Interactive map of the Auberge d'Allemagne area

General information
- Status: Destroyed, some inner rooms survive
- Type: Auberge
- Architectural style: Melitan
- Location: Birgu, Malta, No. 7a–7b, Victory Square
- Coordinates: 35°53′17.2″N 14°31′20.1″E
- Completed: 16th century
- Destroyed: 1940s

Technical details
- Material: Limestone
- Floor count: 2

The Auberge d'Allemagne (Maltese: Auberge d'Allemagne) was an auberge in Birgu, Malta. It was built in the 16th century to house knights of the Order of Saint John from the langue of Germany.

== History ==
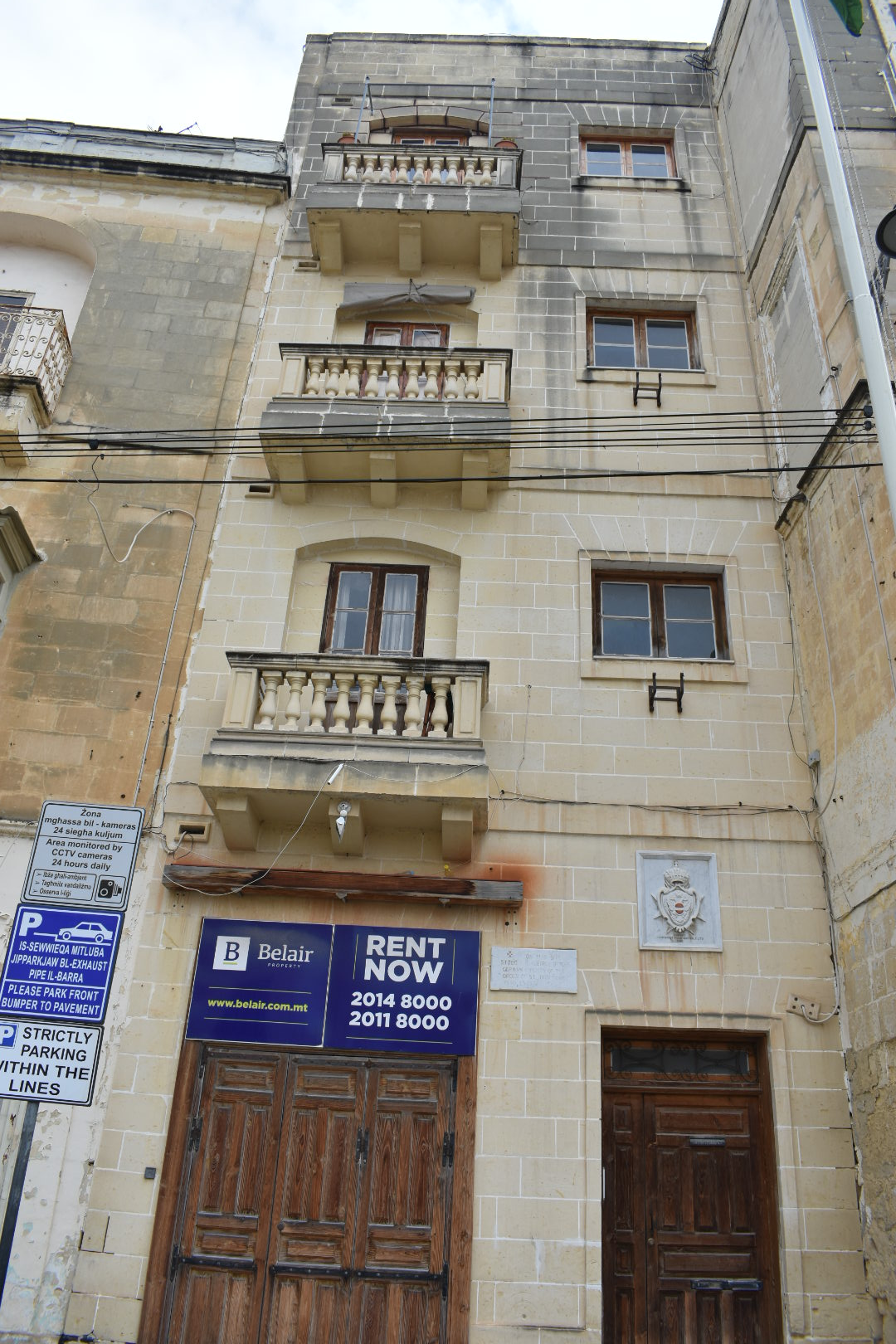
The modern building

Built and used as an auberge in the 16th century, by the German knights, the langue of Germany moved to a new Auberge d'Allemagne in Valletta in the 1570s. The Birgu auberge was initially used as a private residence, before being converted into a casa bottega.

The building was included on the Antiquities List of 1925, together with the other auberges in Birgu.

The auberge was heavily damaged by aerial bombardment during World War II, and only some inner rooms survived the bombing. The site was rebuilt as a four-storey apartment block between 1961 and 1963, incorporating the remains of the auberge into the new building. An original marker still sits in front of the building marking the beginning of the collachio, an area that was reserved for the knights. The initial letter ‘C’ is visible on the top of it.

== Architecture and remains ==
The auberge was a two-storey building constructed in the traditional Maltese style, and the rear of the building was linked to Auberge d'Angleterre, which housed knights of the Order of Saint John from the langue of England. It had a Maltese-style staircase, with mouldings on the façade.

The remains were scheduled as a Grade 3 property on 22 December 2009, and they are also listed on the National Inventory of the Cultural Property of the Maltese Islands.
