= Auberge d'Auvergne et Provence =

- Berġa ta' Alvernja u Provenza
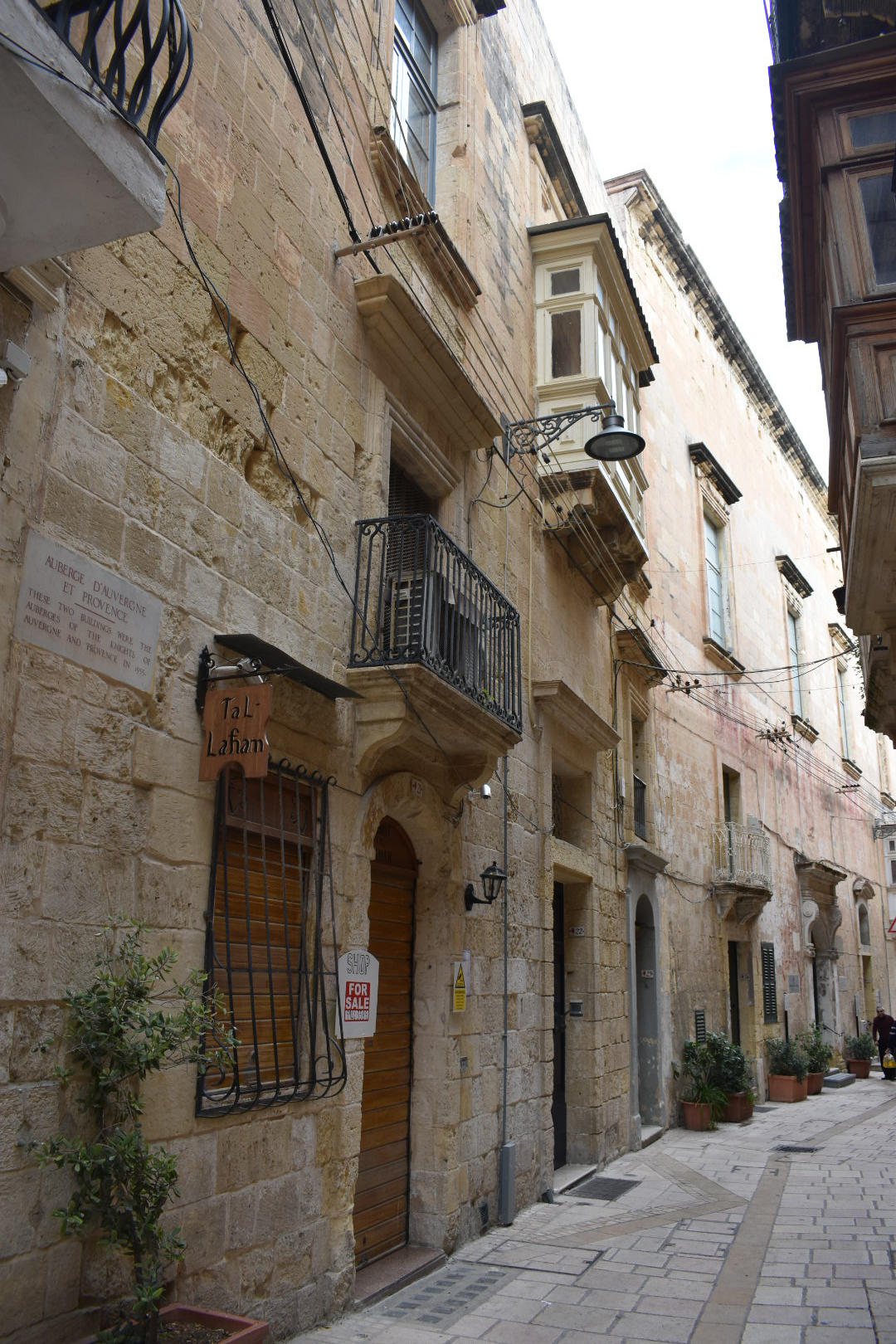
- Façade of the Auberge d' Auvergne et Provence
- Interactive map of the Auberge d'Auvergne et Provence area

General information
- Status: Intact with some alterations
- Type: House
- Architectural style: Melitan
- Location: Birgu, Malta, No. 21–22, Hilda Tabone Street
- Coordinates: 35°53′18.6″N 14°31′21.7″E
- Completed: c. 1531

Technical details
- Material: Limestone
- Floor count: 3

Auberge d'Auvergne et Provence (Maltese: Berġa ta' Alvernja u Provenza) is an auberge in Birgu, Malta. It was built to house knights of the Order of Saint John from the langues of Auvergne and Provence.

Auberge d'Auvergne et Provence was built in the 1530s, incorporating earlier buildings. Parts of the ground floor and basement are believed to date back to the 15th century, while older remains possibly date back to the Byzantine period. The auberge is reported to have been functional by 1531, and its existence is confirmed by the Order's records in August 1532.

The auberge was originally built as two separate auberges, with Auvergne on the right and Provence on the left. At some point, these were joined and shared a single façade. The building formed a compact block with other auberges next to it, namely Auberge d'Aragon and Auberge de France. The façade consists of a central doorway, with smaller doors on each side. The central doorway is embellished with a moulded cornice. The apertures have typical Melitan mouldings.

The auberge continued to house the langues of Auvergne and Provence until the building of a separate Auberge d'Auvergne and Auberge de Provence in Valletta in the 1570s and 1580s.

The building was included on the Antiquities List of 1925, together with the other auberges in Birgu. In the years before World War II, the right side of the building was partially demolished to make way for a modern residence. After the war, the remaining part of the auberge was divided into separate houses and a shop, and the structure was modified by the addition of a timber balcony.

Today, the section of the auberge that housed the langue of Provence remains mostly intact, despite some alterations. The other section, belonging to the langue of Auvergne, has lost part of its façade, although it retains the entrance and a small balcony. The interior of the two auberges remain mostly intact in their original state. It was listed as a Grade 1 national monument on 22 December 2009, and it is also listed on the National Inventory of the Cultural Property of the Maltese Islands.
