= Auberge de France, Birgu =

Auberge de France
- Berġa ta' Franza
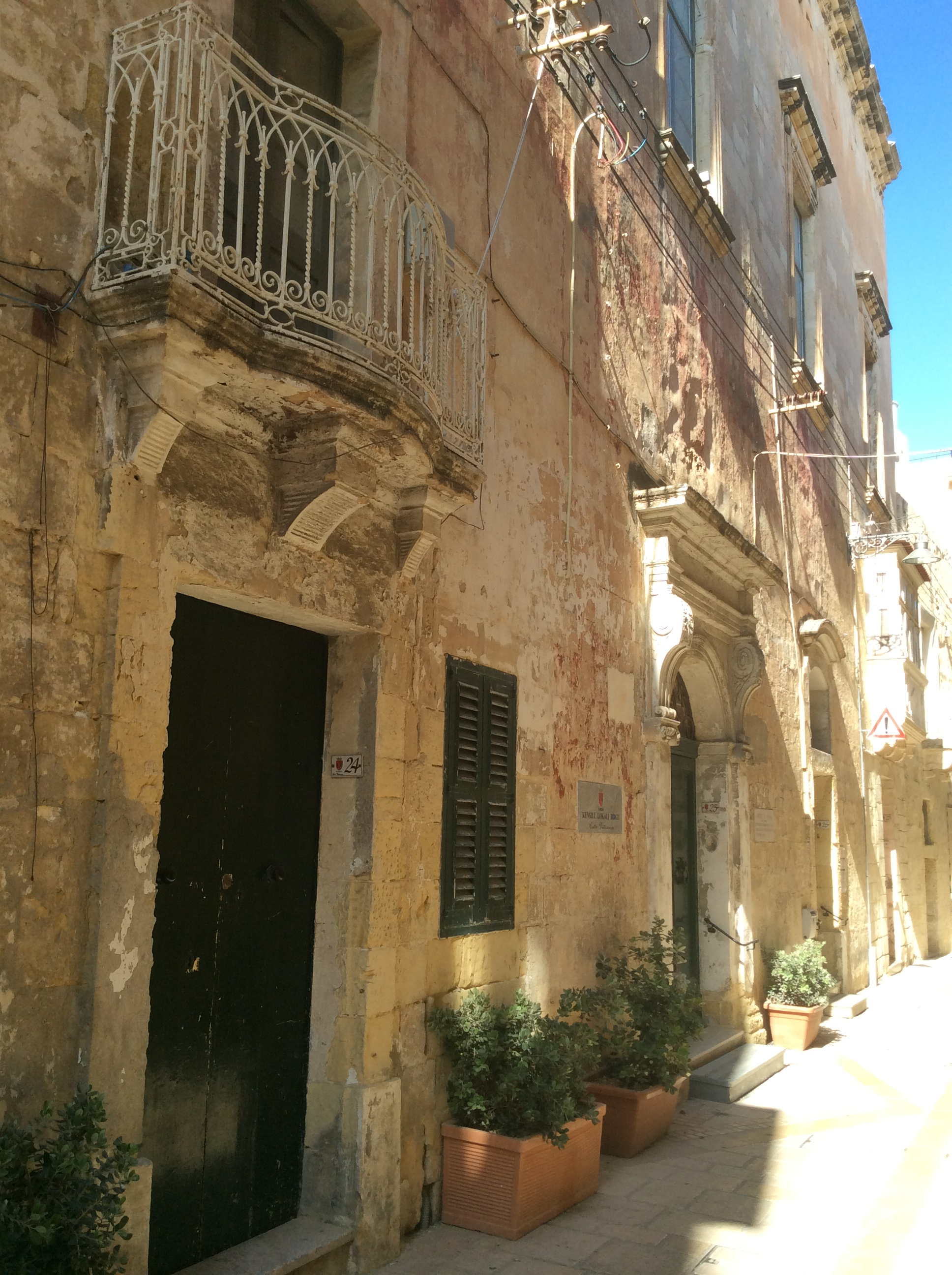
- Façade of Auberge de France
- Interactive map of the Auberge de France area
- Former names: il-Palazz tal-Miljunarju

General information
- Status: Intact
- Type: Auberge
- Architectural style: Melitan
- Location: Birgu, Malta, No. 24–27, Hilda Tabone Street
- Coordinates: 35°53′18.6″N 14°31′22.3″E
- Current tenants: Birgu Local Council
- Completed: c. 1533
- Owner: Government of Malta

Technical details
- Material: Limestone
- Floor count: 2

Design and construction
- Architects: Nicolò Flavari and Bartolommeo Genga (attributed)

Auberge de France (Maltese: Berġa ta' Franza) is an auberge in Birgu, Malta. It was built around 1533 (incorporating an earlier building) to house knights of the Order of Saint John from the langue of France, which induced the entire Kingdom of France except for Auvergne and Provence which were separate langues. The building housed the French langue until a new Auberge de France was opened in Valletta.

The building was subsequently sold, and remained in private hands in the subsequent centuries, at times being informally known as il-Palazz tal-Miljunarju (The Palace of the Millionaire). In the 19th and 20th centuries, the building was used for a number of purposes, including as a school, a furniture factory and a museum. It is now Birgu's city hall, being the seat of the local council.

== History ==
Auberge de France was built in around 1533, incorporating an earlier structure. The first alterations that converted the original building into an auberge are attributed to Nicolò Flavari, the Order's architect who had accompanied them after the fall of Rhodes. Further alterations including redesigning the façade were made later on by Bartolommeo Genga. The auberge was located within Birgu's collachio, adjacent to Auberge d'Auvergne et Provence and Auberge d'Aragon.

The langue of France moved to a larger auberge in the new capital Valletta in around 1571, but it also retained the Birgu auberge until 1586. Along with the other auberges in Birgu, the building was subsequently sold to private owners. In the early 19th century, the former auberge was acquired by the rich Vella family, and it became informally known as il-Palazz tal-Miljunarju (The Palace of the Millionaire). From 1852 to 1918, the building was leased to the government as a primary school. In 1921, Auberge de France was rented to Lorenzo Zammit Naro, and it was converted into a furniture factory. Zammit Naro installed a statuette of Saint Joseph on the portal, but it was later removed. The building was included on the Antiquities List of 1925, together with the other auberges in Birgu.

The building was acquired by the government in 1938, on the urging of Canon Gian Mari Farrugia and Sir Harry Luke. At this point, an inscription indicating the building's history was installed on the façade. The auberge fell into disuse after World War II, before housing a carpenter's workshop between 1966 and 1978. In 1981, it was opened to the public as a political history museum after some restoration work. The museum was unsuccessful, and it closed down in 1987. The building fell into disrepair once again, and the ceiling was renovated in 1990 after sustaining rainwater damage. The auberge was retained by the Museums Department, and plans to convert it into a Museum of the Maltese Language never materialized. The building was subsequently occasionally used for cultural events.

The auberge was passed to Heritage Malta in 2010, before being restored and subsequently rented to the Birgu Local Council in 2012. The seat of the local council was transferred to the auberge, which now serves as Birgu's city hall.

Auberge de France is the second best-preserved Hospitaller auberge in Birgu, after Auberge d'Angleterre. The building was scheduled as a Grade 1 national monument on 22 December 2009, and it is also listed on the National Inventory of the Cultural Property of the Maltese Islands.

== Architecture ==
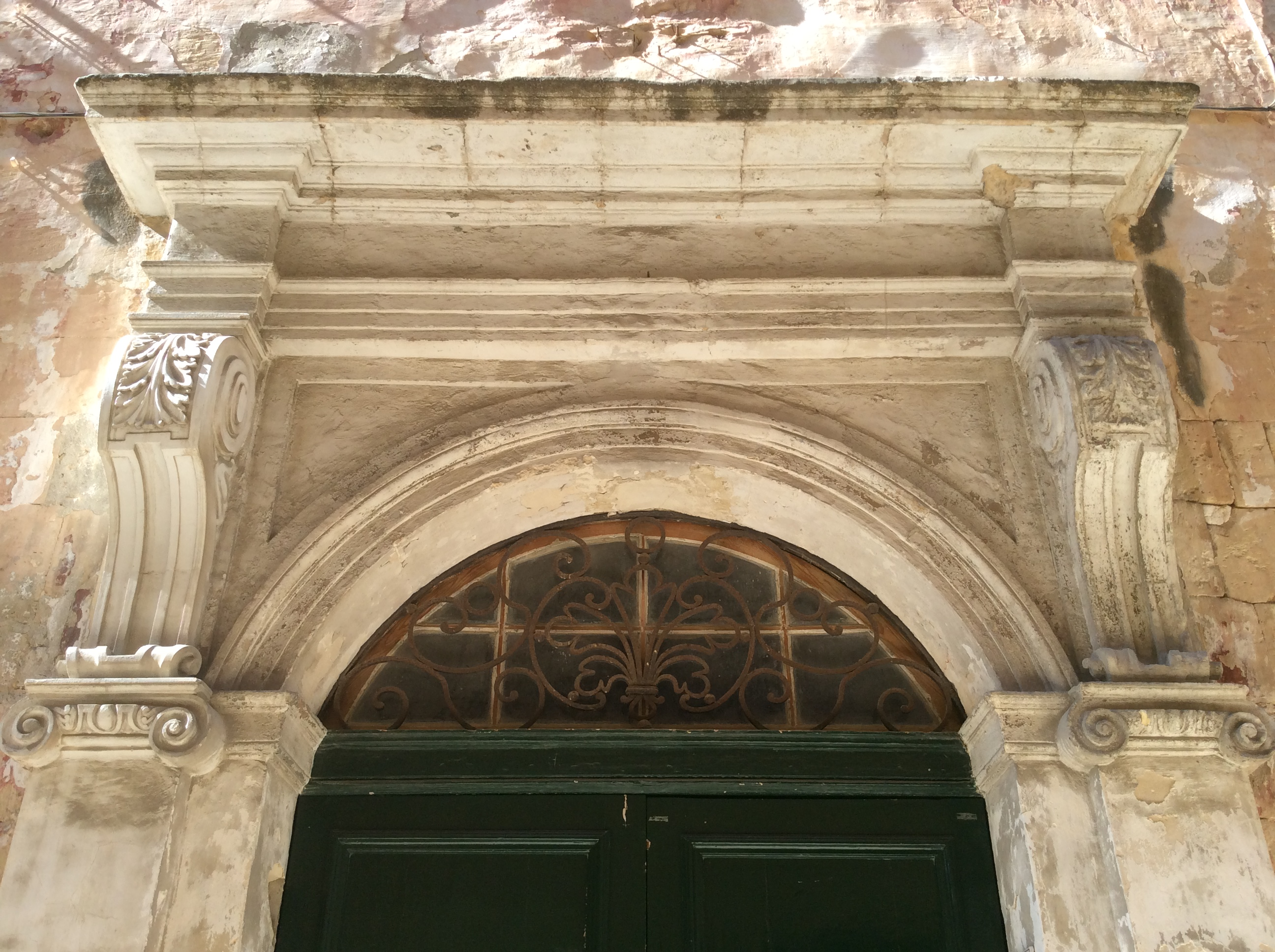
Door cornice and wrought iron

Auberge de France is built in the Melitan style, based on traditional Maltese architecture, and it has a similar layout as Auberge d'Angleterre. It is a two-storey building with rooms built around a central courtyard, and it has a symmetrical façade with moulded windows.

The ornate main doorway is topped by a wrought iron lattice bearing the fleur-de-lys, the symbol of France. The entrance hall and most parts of the building receive natural light from the backyard, and the ground floor is connected to the upper one by a covered staircase. In the middle landing of the staircase there is a carved stone lion, a common feature in palatial buildings at the time. The main hall on the top floor once served as the assembly hall of the Langue.

The auberge's basement incorporates parts of an earlier building which previously stood on the site.
