= Auberge d'Aragon, Birgu =

Auberge in Birgu, Malta

Auberge d'Aragon
- Berġa ta' Aragona
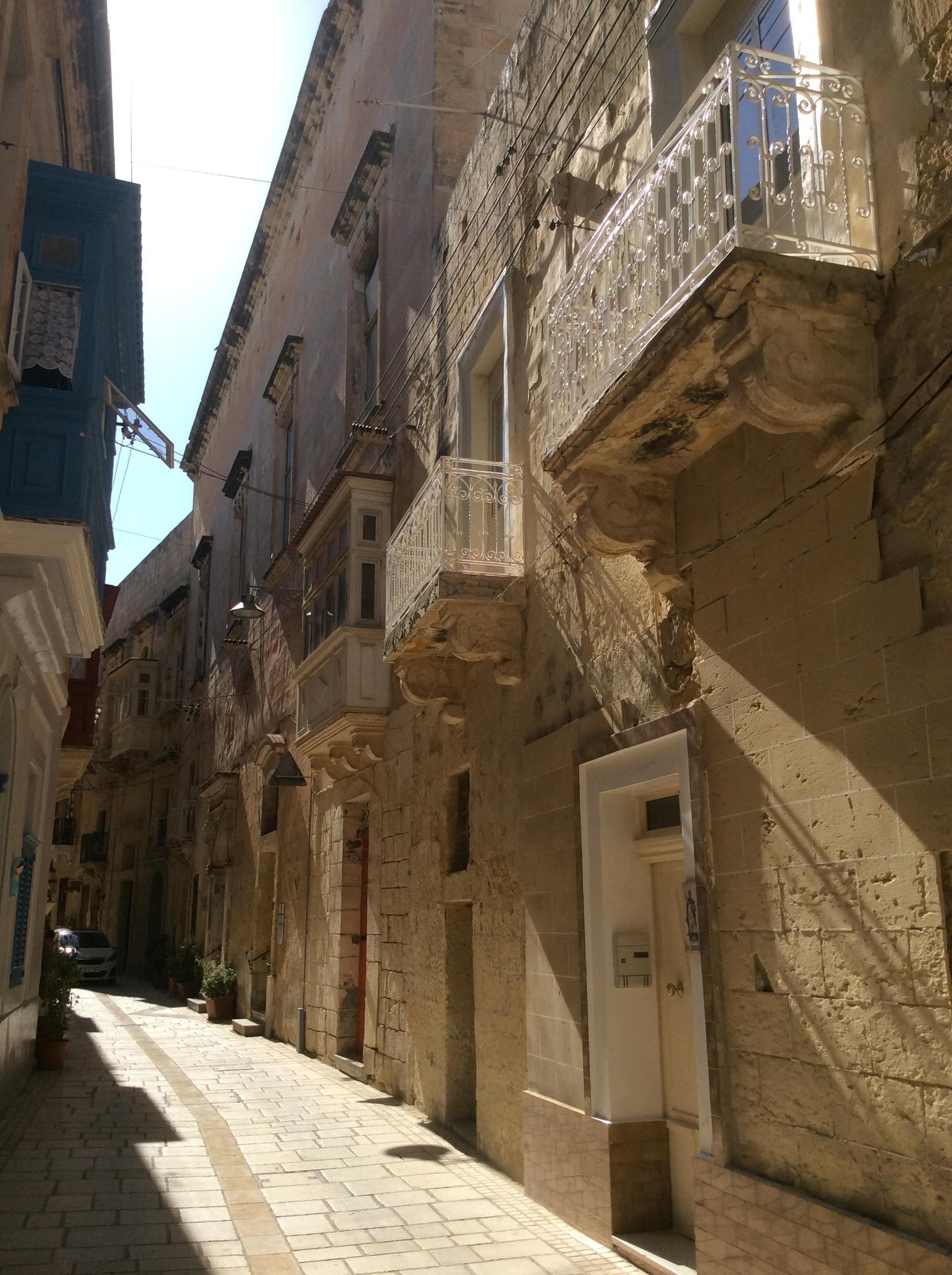
- Auberge d'Aragon (right), next to Auberge de France (left)
- Interactive map of the Auberge d'Aragon area

General information
- Status: Intact with some alterations
- Type: Auberge
- Location: Birgu, Malta, No. 28–30, Hilda Tabone Street
- Coordinates: 35°53′18.8″N 14°31′23″E
- Construction started: 16th century
- Owner: Private

Technical details
- Material: Limestone
- Floor count: 2

The Auberge d'Aragon (Maltese: Berġa ta' Aragona) is an auberge in Birgu, Malta. It was built in the 16th century to house knights of the Order of Saint John from the langue of Aragon, Navarre and Catalonia.

The auberge was located within Birgu's collachio, adjacent to Auberge d'Auvergne et Provence and Auberge de France. The building is two stories high, and it has a central doorway and two balconies. The building housed the Langue of Aragon until a larger Auberge d'Aragon was built in Valletta sometime after 1571.

Part of the façade is now covered with stone slabs, but the auberge still retains its original character. The building is now privately owned.

The building was included on the Antiquities List of 1925, together with the other auberges in Birgu. It was scheduled as a Grade 1 national monument on 22 December 2009, and it is also listed on the National Inventory of the Cultural Property of the Maltese Islands.
