= Auberge d'Angleterre =

- Berġa tal-Ingilterra
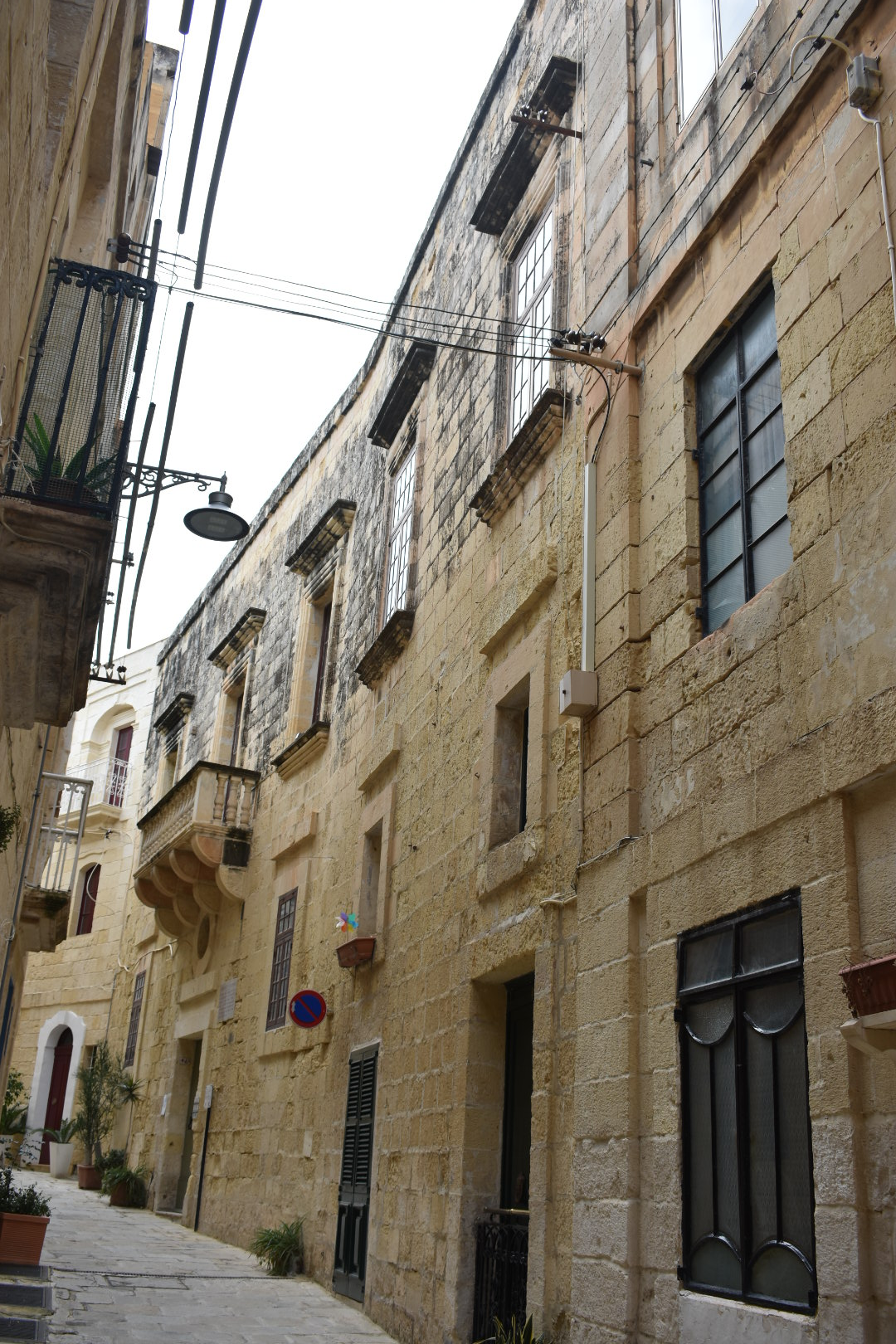
- View of Auberge d'Angleterre
- Interactive map of the Auberge d'Angleterre area

General information
- Status: Intact
- Type: Auberge
- Architectural style: Melitan
- Location: Birgu, Malta, No. 40–42, Northwest Street
- Coordinates: 35°53′17.5″N 14°31′21.4″E
- Current tenants: Vittoriosa Health Centre
- Completed: c. 1534
- Owner: Government of Malta

Technical details
- Material: Limestone
- Floor count: 2

Auberge d'Angleterre (Maltese: Berġa tal-Ingilterra) is an auberge in Birgu, Malta. It was built around 1534 (incorporating an earlier building) to house knights of the Order of Saint John from the langue of England (whose members came from England, Scotland, and Ireland). It now houses a health centre, and is the best-preserved Hospitaller auberge in Birgu.

== History ==
Auberge d'Angleterre incorporates an earlier single-storey building which originally belonged to a Maltese woman named Catherine Abela. The building was sold to the English knight Sir Clement West in December 1534, and he donated it to the langue of England in May 1535. The house was converted into the langue's headquarters, and a first floor was added at this point.

The rear of Auberge d'Angleterre was linked to the now-destroyed Auberge d'Allemagne. The auberge is also located adjacent to the house of Sir Oliver Starkey, the secretary of Grand Master Jean de Valette and one of the last English knights of the Order.

The langue of England was suppressed in the mid-16th century during the English Reformation, so no English auberge was built in Valletta when the Order moved their capital in the 1570s. The langue was reestablished as the Anglo-Bavarian Langue in 1782, and it was housed in a former palace which became known as Auberge de Bavière.

The building was included on the Antiquities List of 1925, together with the other auberges in Birgu. Until recently, Auberge d'Angleterre was used as a public library, and it also briefly housed a non-governmental organization The Three Cities Foundation. The auberge now houses the Vittoriosa Health Centre.

Auberge d'Angleterre has survived intact, and it is the best-preserved Hospitaller auberge in Birgu. The building was scheduled as a Grade 1 national monument on 22 December 2009, and it is also listed on the National Inventory of the Cultural Property of the Maltese Islands.

== Architecture ==
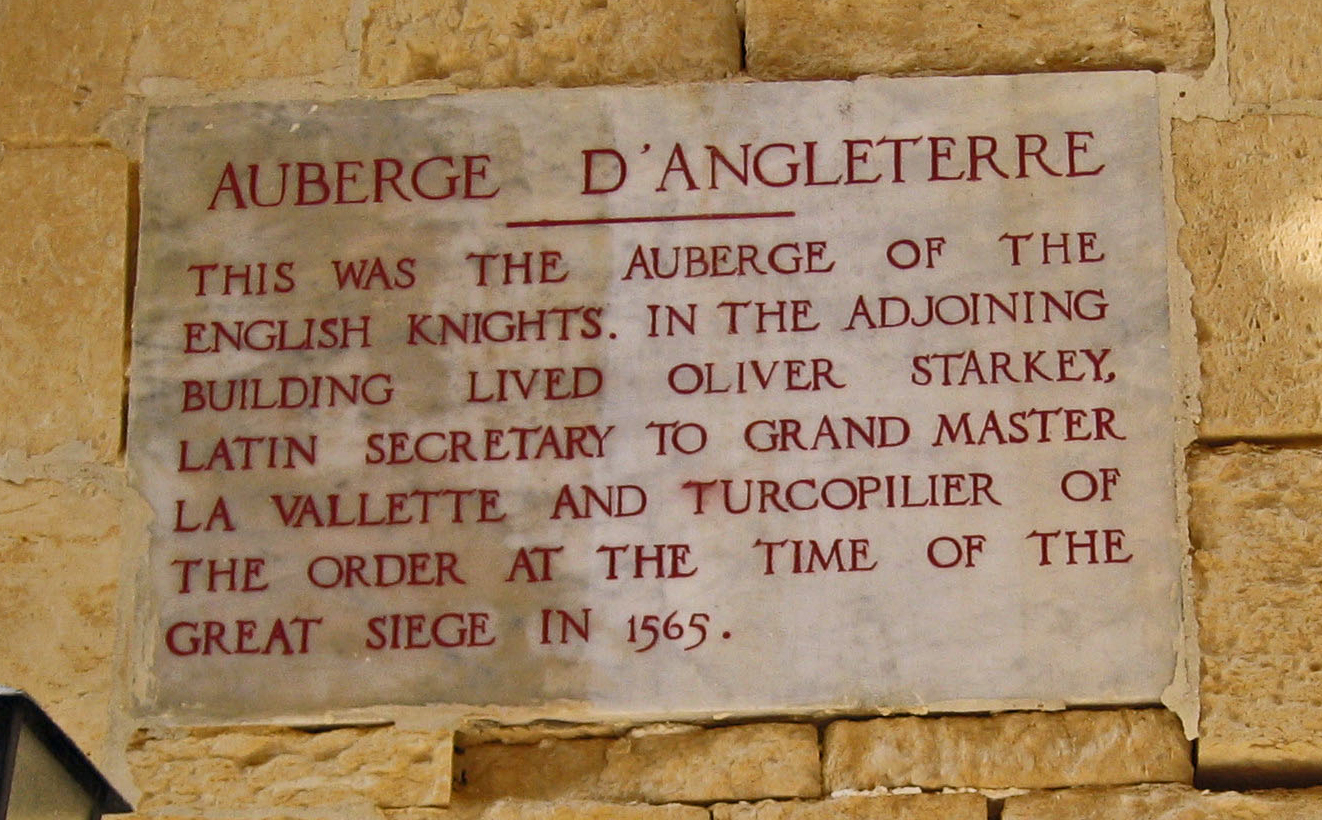
Plaque on the auberge

Auberge d'Angleterre is built in the Melitan style, based on traditional Maltese architecture, and has a similar layout as Auberge de France. It is a two-storey building with rooms built around a central courtyard. The piano nobile is located at the first floor.

It has a plain façade with a doorway topped by a circular window and flanked by windows on each side. The first floor has an overhanging open balcony above the doorway, again flanked by windows. The door and windows are all decorated by Melitan mouldings.
