= Louis Charles, Count of Beaujolais =

French royal; son of Louis Philippe II, Duke of Orléans (1779-1808)

Louis Charles
- Count of Beaujolais
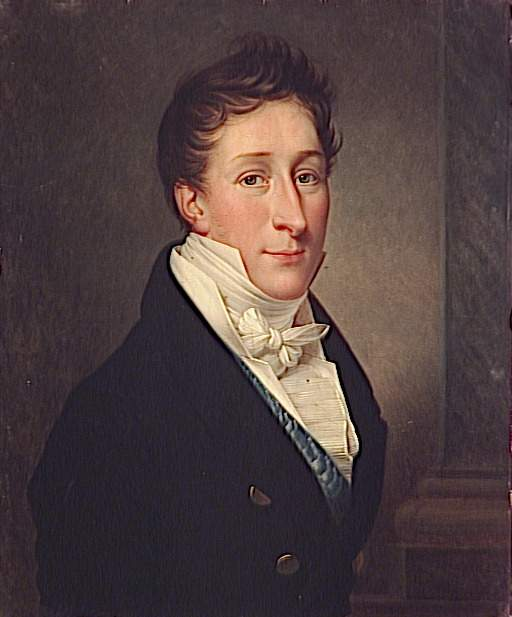
- Portrait by Charles-François Phelippes. c.1838, Palace of Versailles
- Born: 7 October 1779; Palais-Royal, Paris, France
- Died: 30 May 1808 (aged 28); Casa Miari, Valletta, Malta
- Burial: St John's Co-Cathedral, Valletta
Names
- Louis Charles Alphonse Léodgard d'Orléans
- House: Orléans
- Father: Philippe d'Orléans
- Mother: Louise Marie Adélaïde de Bourbon
- Religion: Roman Catholicism
- Coat of arms of Louis Charles, Count of Beaujolais

Louis Charles Alphonse Léodgard d'Orléans, Count of Beaujolais (7 October 1779 – 30 May 1808) was a French prince of the blood, son of Philippe Égalité and the younger brother of King Louis-Philippe I of the French.

== Biography ==
Louis Charles was born at the Palais-Royal in Paris. He was the third and youngest son of Philippe d'Orléans, Duke of Chartres, later Duke of Orléans as Philippe Égalité, and of his wife, Louise Marie Adélaïde de Bourbon. As a member of the reigning House of Bourbon, he was a prince du sang.

His mother was the only surviving child and heiress of the wealthy Duke of Penthièvre, Louis Jean Marie de Bourbon. She was also the sister in law of the famous Princesse de Lamballe, Marie Thérèse Louise of Savoy.

In 1781, the Countess of Genlis was appointed to be the governess to Louis-Charles and to his two older brothers Louis-Philippe and Antoine. Two years later the abbé Mariottini, nephew of the apostolic nuncio to France, was made his tutor, but he resigned in 1786 after a conflict with Madame de Genlis. Louis Charles was then tutored by the first chamberlain Barrois, before being assigned to the under-governor Lebrun in 1789.

In April 1793 Louis Charles was arrested with his father and imprisoned at Fort-Saint-Jean in Marseille. During his imprisonment he contracted tuberculosis, a condition which eventually caused his death. His father was executed in November 1793 but Louis Charles remained imprisoned until August 1796 when the Directory decided to exile him and his brother Antoine to Philadelphia. The French chargé d'affaires in Philadelphia settled upon Louis-Charles an annual pension of 15,000 francs.

In February 1797 Louis Charles and Antoine were joined in Philadelphia by their older brother Louis Philippe. Together they travelled to New York City and Boston, and as far north as Maine and as far south as Nashville.

In September 1797 Louis Charles and his brothers learnt that their mother had gone into exile in Spain, and so they decided to return to Europe. They went to New Orleans, planning to sail to Cuba and from there to Spain. The ship they took from New Orleans, however, was captured by a British warship in the Gulf of Mexico.

The British seized the three brothers, but took them to Havana anyway. Unable to find passage to Europe, the three brothers spent a year in Cuba, until they were unexpectedly expelled by the Spanish authorities. They sailed via the Bahamas to Nova Scotia. Eventually, the brothers sailed back to New York, and in January 1800, they arrived in England, where they settled at Twickenham outside London.

In September 1804 Louis Charles entered the Royal Navy, but his health did not allow him to continue a military career. In October he and his brothers went on a brief expedition to the French coast. They were fired upon by the French batteries at Boulogne but escaped without harm.

In 1808, in an attempt to improve Louis Charles' health, his older brother Louis Philippe accompanied him on a voyage to Gibraltar, Sicily and Malta. The brothers were received at Casa Miari, a palace in the Maltese capital city Valletta.

Louis Charles, however, continued to deteriorate; he died of tuberculosis a fortnight after his arrival on the island. His funeral took place on 3 June. Ten years later his body was buried on 10 April 1818 in St. John's Co-Cathedral in Valletta. James Pradier designed and sculpted his tomb, a replica of which is at Dreux.

Louis Charles' portrait was painted posthumously in 1818 by Albert Gregorius and by Charles-Francois Phelippes (both now in the Palais-Royal). Another portrait was painted in 1835 by Amédée Fauré (now at the Château d'Eu). There are copies of all three portraits in the Palace of Versailles.

== Ancestors ==
Ancestors of Louis Charles, Count of Beaujolais

8. Louis, Duke of Orléans
4. Louis Philippe I, Duke of Orléans
9. Auguste of Baden-Baden
2. Louis Philippe II, Duke of Orléans
10. Louis Armand II, Prince of Conti
5. Louise Henriette de Bourbon
11. Louise Élisabeth de Bourbon
1. Louis Charles, Count of Beaujolais
12. Louis Alexandre, Count of Toulouse
6. Louis Jean Marie, Duke of Penthièvre
13. Marie Victoire de Noailles
3. Louise Marie Adélaïde de Bourbon
14. Francesco III d'Este, Duke of Modena
7. Maria Teresa Felicitas d'Este
15. Charlotte Aglaé of Orléans

== Bibliography ==
- The Adami Collection - collection of Parish records of Marriages, legacy and nobility, National Library of Malta, vol 10, pp 1838.
- Abela, A.E. A Nation's Praise - Malta: People, Places and Events. Historical Sketches. Progress Press, 1994. ISBN 99909-3-038-4
- The Beaujolois Tradition by Stephen Tyrrell, 2018, Pasticcio Ltd, ISBN 978-0-9570311-6-6
