= Admiralty House (Valletta) =

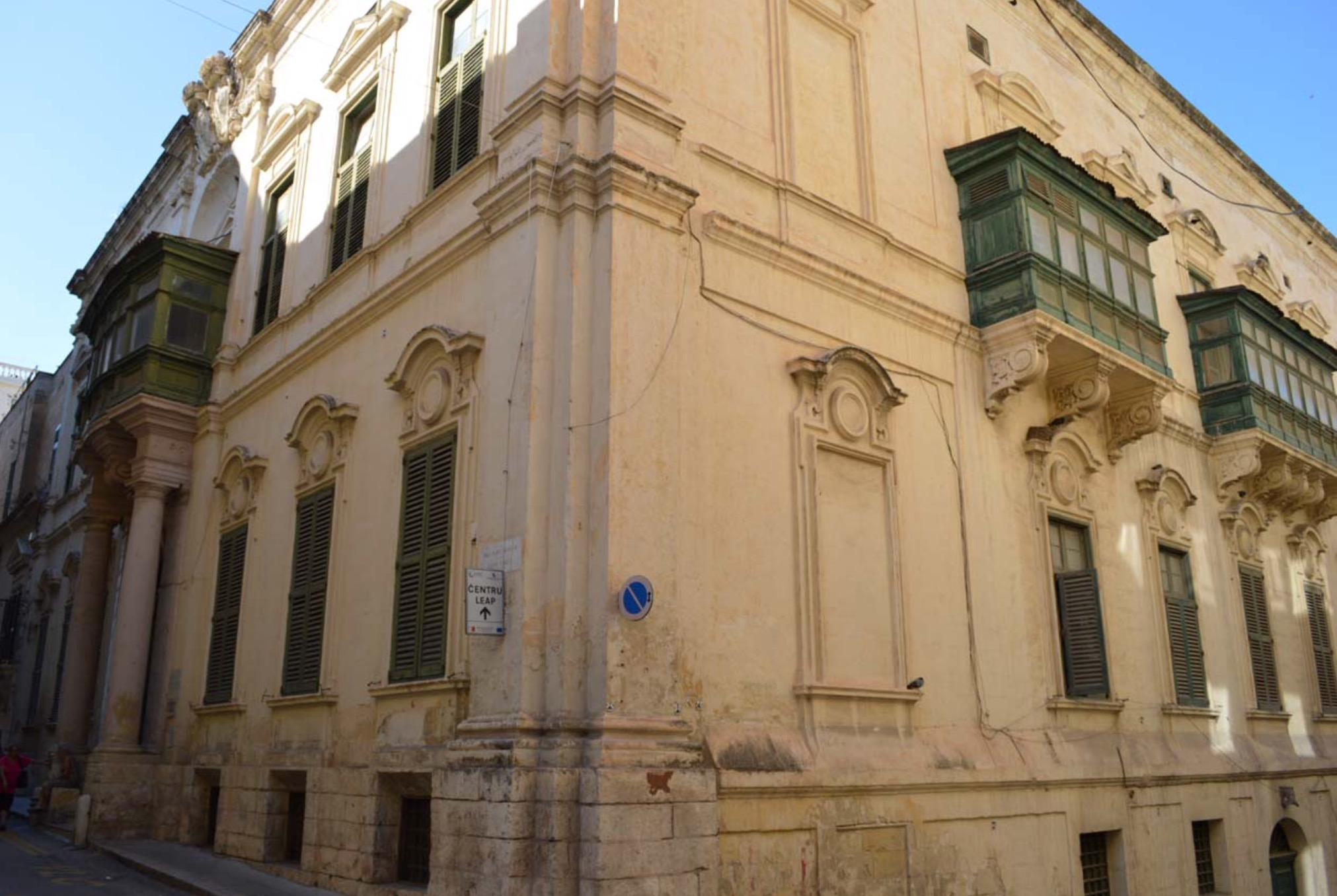
- Façade of Admiralty House
- Interactive map of the Admiralty House area
- Former names: Casa Miari; Palazzo Don Raimondo and several other names

General information
- Status: Intact
- Type: Palace
- Architectural style: Baroque
- Location: Valletta, Malta
- Coordinates: 35°53′54″N 14°30′33″E
- Current tenants: National Museum of Fine Arts
- Construction started: 1569–1570
- Renovated: 1761–1763
- Owner: Government of Malta

Technical details
- Material: Limestone
- Floor count: 2

Design and construction
- Architect: Andrea Belli

Admiralty House (Maltese: id-Dar tal-Ammirall) (formerly known as Casa Miari, Palazzo Don Raimondo and by several other names) is a palace in Valletta, Malta. It was originally built between 1569 and 1570 as two private houses by Fra. Jean de Soubiran dit Arafat, a knight of the Order of St. John. The houses were later leased to various owners, including Fra. Raimondo de Sousa y Silva, who rebuilt them a single residence between 1761 and 1763.

In 1808, Louis Charles, Count of Beaujolais, was received at the house, where he subsequently died of tuberculosis. From 1821 to 1961, the building was the official residence of the Commander-in-Chief of the British Mediterranean Fleet, hence its name. The building housed the National Museum of Fine Arts from 1974 to 2016. Currently there are plans to restore the house and convert it into the Office of the Attorney General.

== History ==
=== Hospitaller rule ===
The site of the Admiralty House was originally occupied by two houses which were built by the French knight Fra Jean de Soubiran dit Arafat in 1569–70. The properties passed down to another knight François le Petit de la Guerche, and were taken over by the Treasury of the Order of St. John upon his death in 1663. From 1668 onwards, the houses were leased to various knights.

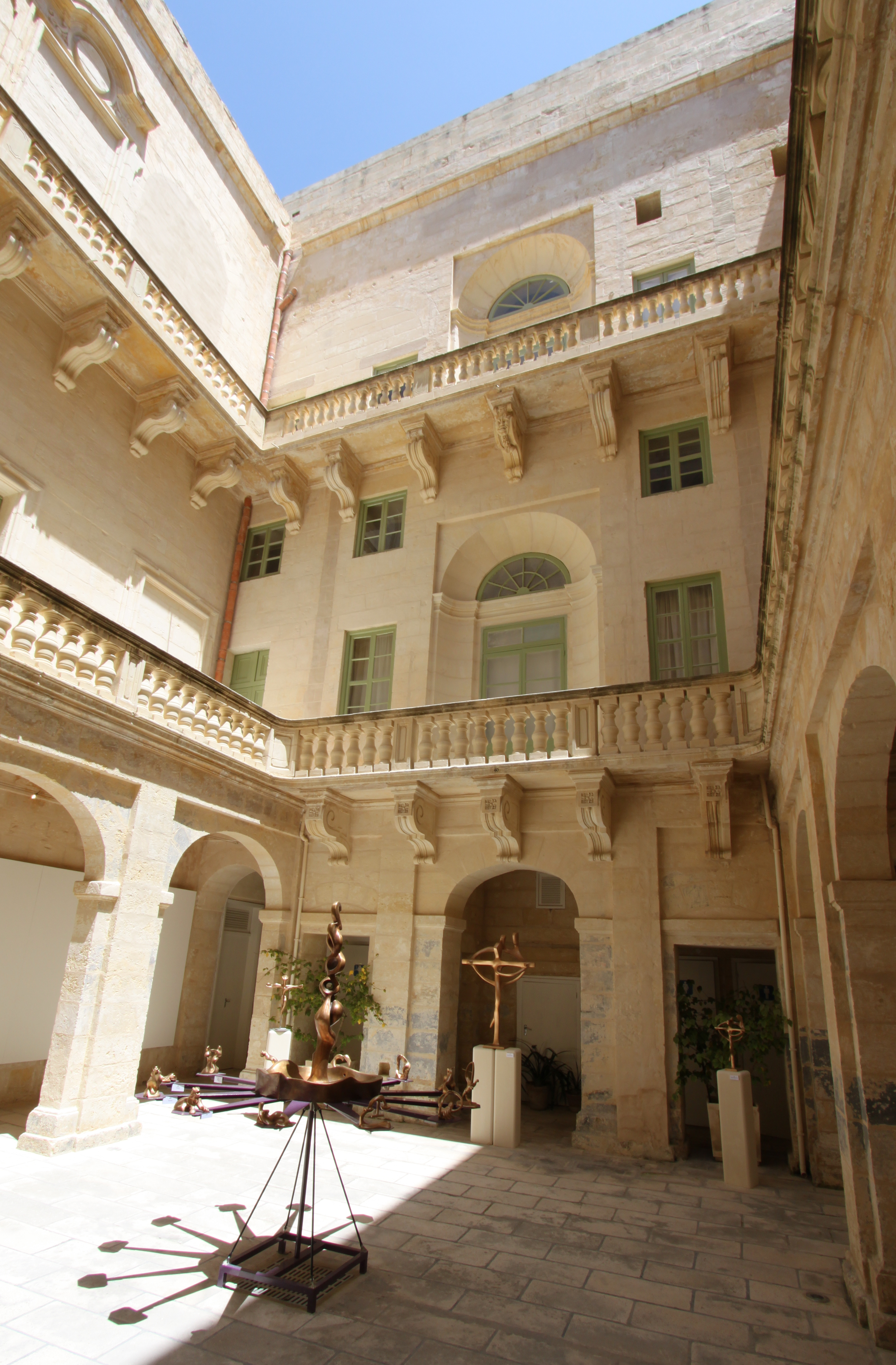
Courtyard at Admiralty House

In the 1760s, the two houses were occupied by Fra Raimondo de Sousa y Silva, a wealthy Portuguese knight who was the Balì of Lessa. The Treasury rebuilt the houses to their present form between 1761 and 1763 so as to better accommodate the Balì, and the building became known as Palazzo Don Raimondo after him. The reconstruction is attributed to Andrea Belli, the architect who also redesigned Auberge de Castille. The building was constructed from limestone quarried at Floriana.

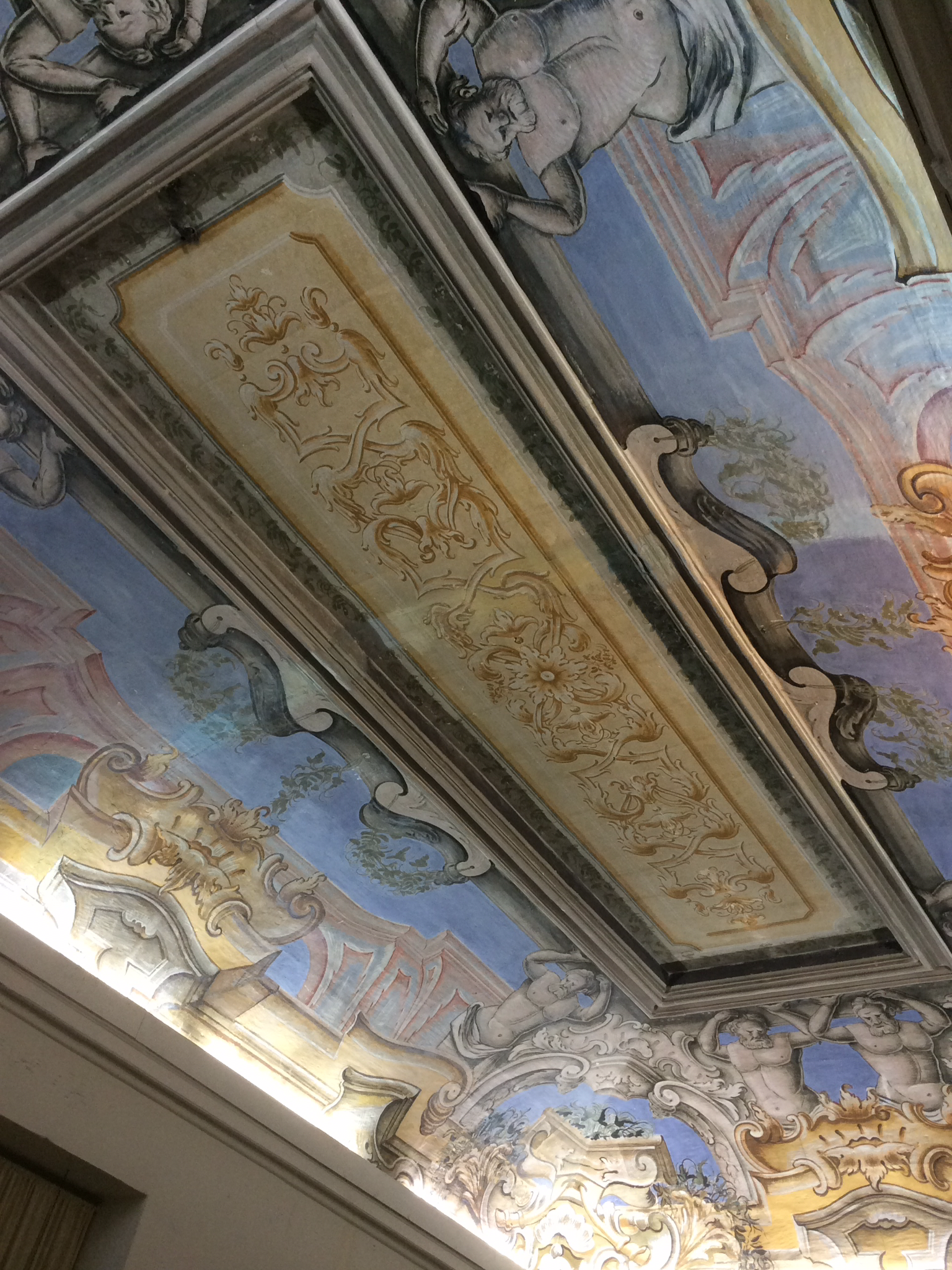
Ceiling afresco at the Admiralty House.

De Sousa died in 1782, and from 1783 to 1785 the house was divided into several apartments. It was subsequently converted back to a single residence, and was again let to a number of knights. Throughout its history, the house was known by a number of names depending on its occupants, including Maison Arifat, Casa de Guerche and Maison Fleurigny. In the late 18th and early 19th century, it was known as Casa Miari after Fra Antonio Miari di Belluno, Secretary to Grand Master Ferdinand von Hompesch zu Bolheim, who lived in the house from 1795 to 1798.

=== French occupation and British rule ===
During the French occupation of Malta, the government offered the building to Bishop Vincenzo Labini as a seminary, but these plans were never implemented due to the Maltese uprising and blockade of 1798–1800. At this point, the coats of arms on the façade were defaced according to orders issued by Napoleon.

After Malta became a British protectorate in 1800, the house was occupied by Civil Commissioner Alexander Ball. It was then let to Alexander Macaulay, Secretary to the Civil Commissioner, between August 1802 and June 1803. In 1808, the palace received Louis Philippe, Duke of Orléans and Louis Charles, Count of Beaujolais during their visit to Malta. Louis Charles died of tuberculosis there on 29 May 1808, and was buried at St John's Co-Cathedral in Valletta.

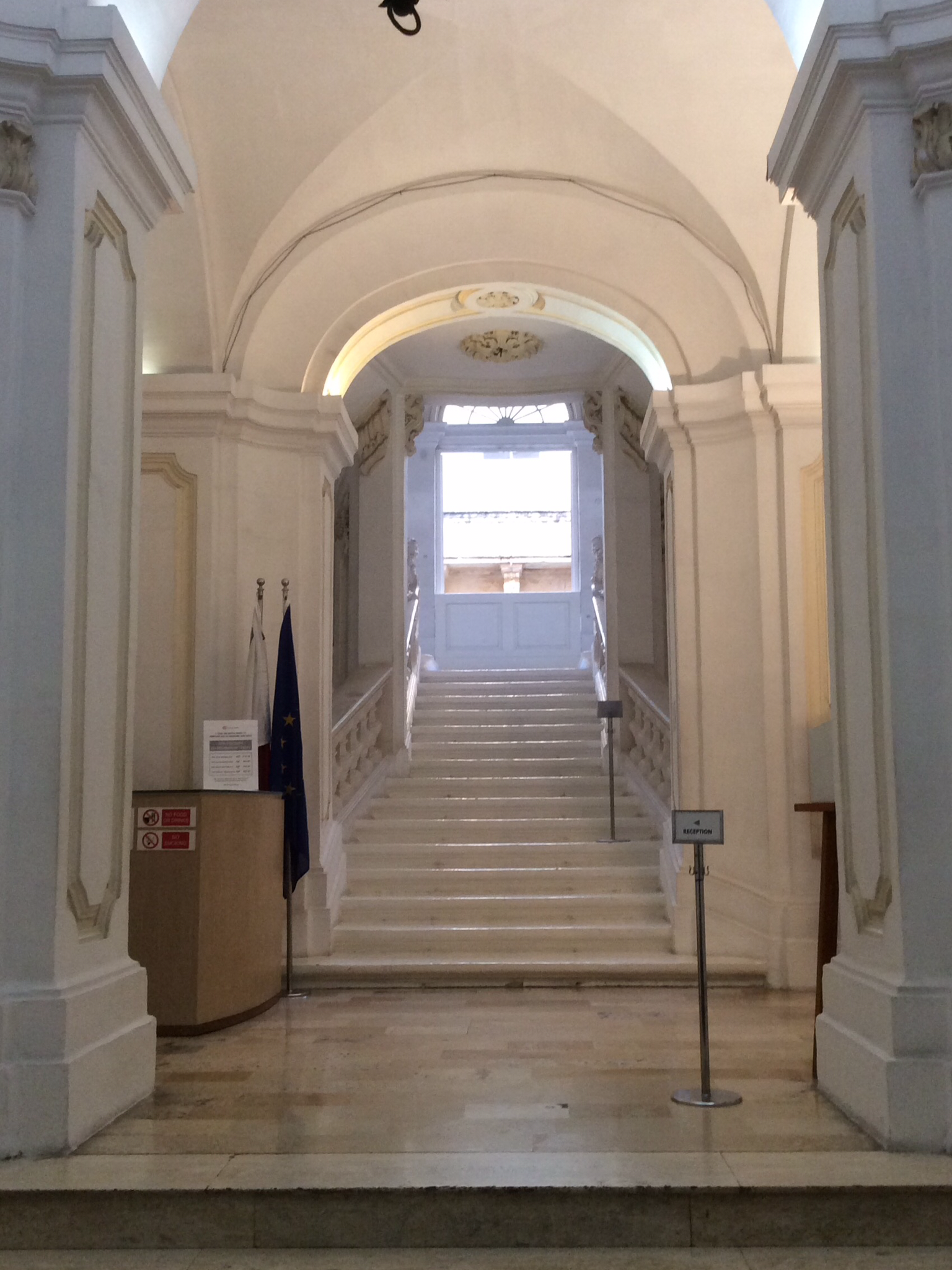
Entrance hall leading to the grand staircase

From 1808 to 1820, the British military authorities occupied the building without paying any rent. In 1821, the building was officially leased to the naval authorities as the official residence of the Commander-in-Chief of the Mediterranean Fleet, becoming known as Admiralty House. The building received various notable personalities as residents or guests, including Lord Mountbatten, Winston Churchill, King George V and Queen Elizabeth. The building was handed over to the Government of Malta in 1961.

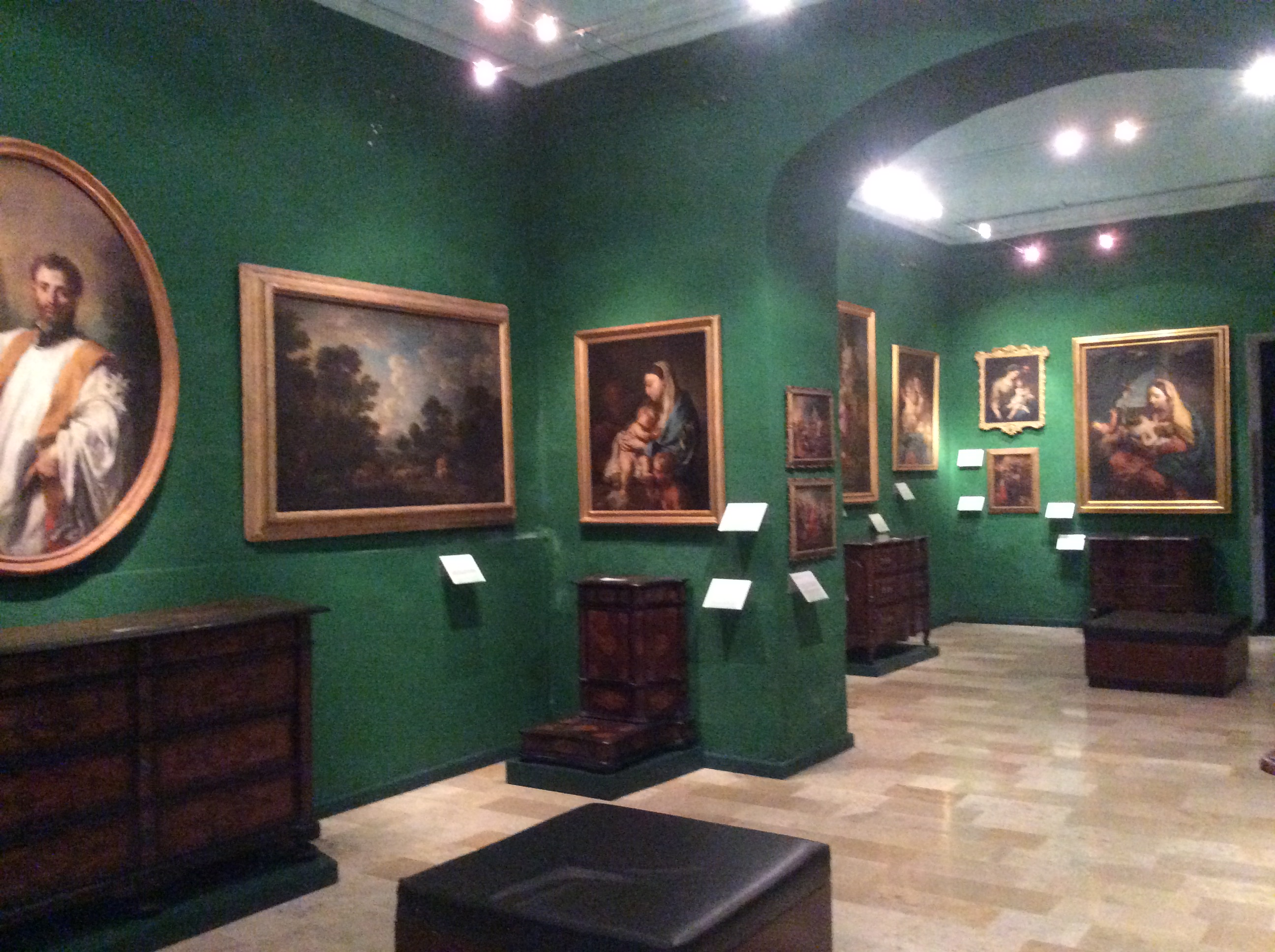
The National Museum of Fine Arts at Admiralty House

=== Independent Malta ===
The building was subsequently restored and on 7 May 1974 it was inaugurated by Minister Agatha Barbara as the National Museum of Fine Arts. Among those present were the director of the museum, Francis Mallia, and the President of Malta, Anthony Mamo. Plans to move the museum from Admiralty House to Auberge d'Italie began in 2013, and it was officially announced that the move will occur and the new museum would be called MUŻA (from the Maltese acronym Mużew Nazzjonali tal-Arti) in September 2014.

In early 2013, plans were made to transfer the Ministry for Tourism and the Malta Tourism Authority into Admiralty House and two nearby buildings (Casa Scaglia and 8, Old Mint Street) after the transfer of the museum. In November, of that year, it was concluded that further development of the buildings would not be appropriate and the three joined houses are not adequate to host the entire ministry with its necessities and to accommodate roughly 200 people as working staff. The Ministry for Tourism has moved to new premises in 233, Republic Street, and the Malta Tourism Authority is set to move to Smart City, so the use of Admiralty House after the museum is transferred was unclear until November 2013.

The National Museum of Fine Arts closed on 2 October 2016. There are plans to restore the building and convert it into the offices of the Attorney General, which is currently housed in part of the Grandmaster's Palace.

Admiralty House is a Grade 1 monument and it is also listed on the National Inventory of the Cultural Property of the Maltese Islands.

== Architecture ==
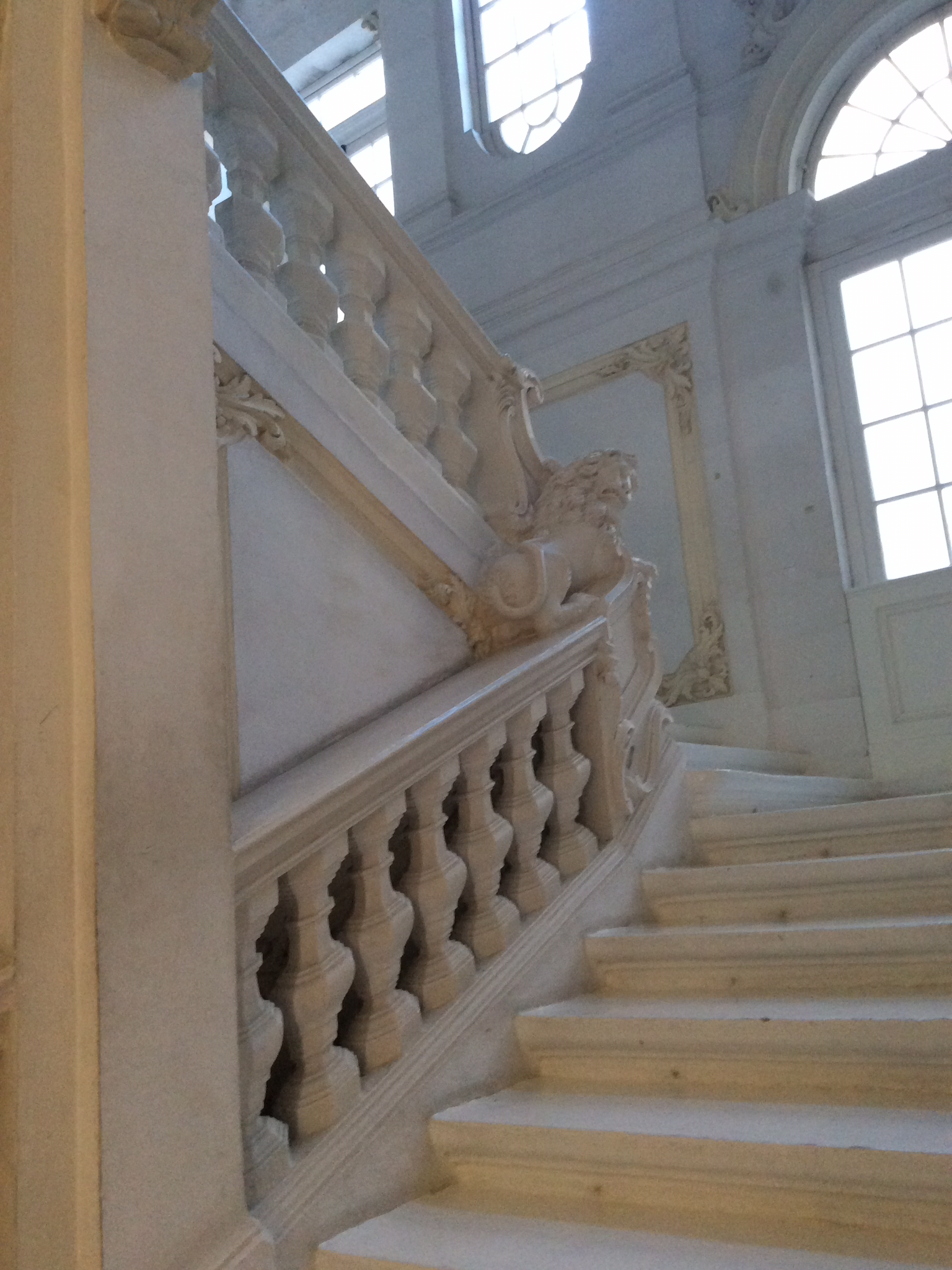
Part of the staircase

Admiralty House is an example of late Baroque architecture, although it has also been described as Italianate or Rococo. The building consists of halls built around a central courtyard, and it has two floors above ground along with a basement.

The façade was originally decorated with escutcheons containing the coats of arms of the Order and of Grand Master Manuel Pinto da Fonseca, but these were defaced during the French occupation of 1798–1800.

The building has a monumental free-standing staircase, which is said to be one of the finest in Malta. It might have been influenced by the staircases at Auberge de Castille in Valletta, Würzburg Residence in Bavaria and Palais Kinsky and the Upper Belvedere in Vienna.

== Bibliography ==
- Scicluna, Hannibal P. (1933). "Notes on the Admiralty House, Valletta" (PDF). Archivum Melitense. 9 (2): 57–72. Archived from the original on 16 April 2016.
