= MUŻA =

- Mużew Nazzjonali tal-Arti
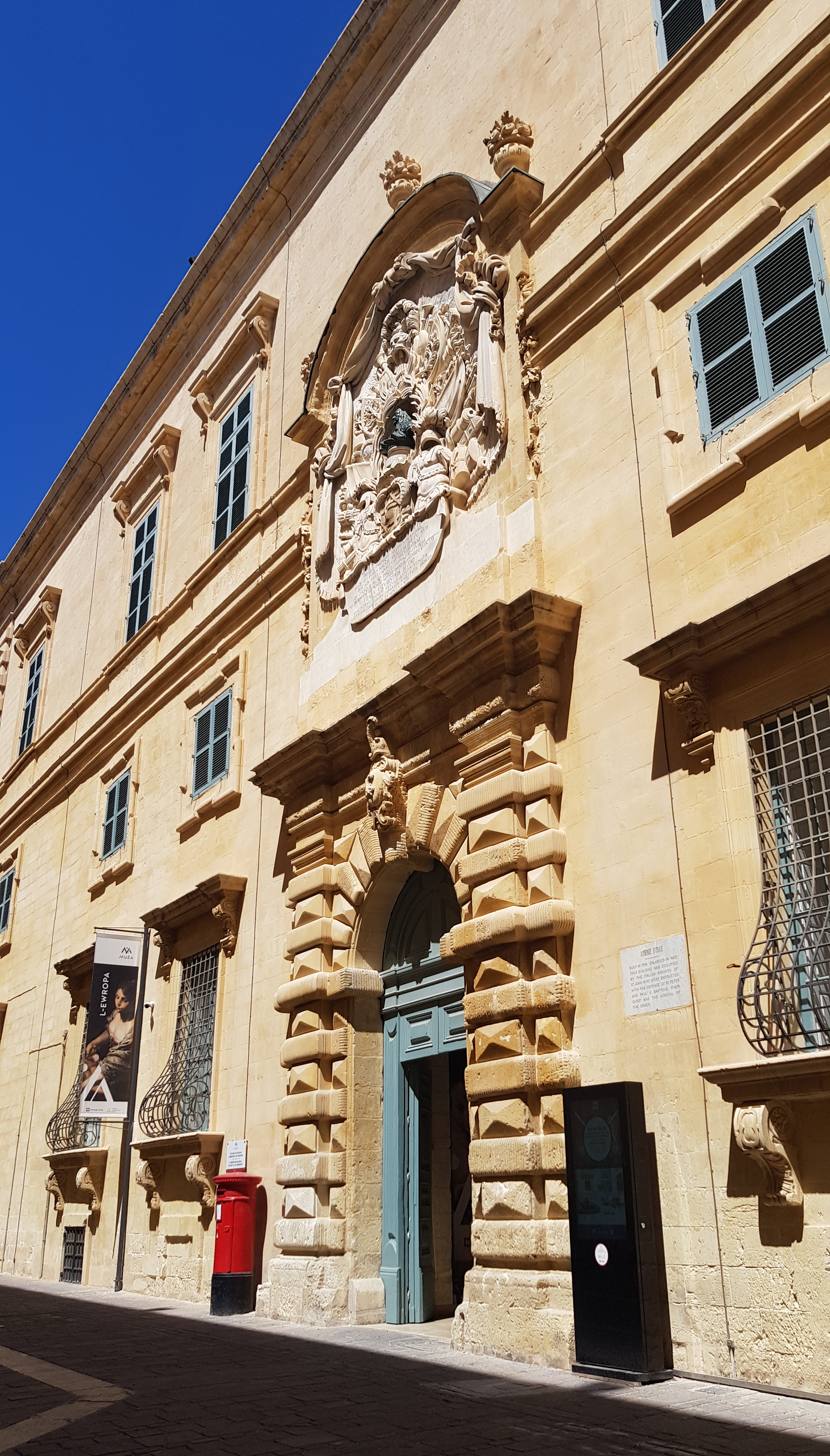
- Façade of Auberge d'Italie in 2020
- Former name: National Museum of Fine Arts
- Established: 10 November 2018
- Location: Auberge d'Italie, Valletta, Malta
- Coordinates: 35°53′47″N 14°30′41″E
- Type: Art museum
- Website: Official website

MUŻA is an art museum located at Auberge d'Italie in Valletta, Malta. It was formerly located at Admiralty House between 1974 and 2016, when it was known as the National Museum of Fine Arts (Maltese: Mużew Nazzjonali tal-Arti).

It houses a collection of works by Maltese and foreign artists mainly representing the major European artistic styles. The museum was inaugurated on 7 May 1974, and it was located at Admiralty House, an 18th-century palace which was formerly the official residence of the Commander-in-Chief of the Mediterranean Fleet. The museum was closed down on 2 October 2016. In 2018 the national collection of fine arts was moved and put on display in the new National Community Art Museum, MUŻA (from the Maltese acronym Mużew Nazzjonali tal-Arti), located at Auberge d’Italie in Valletta.

== History ==
=== National collection prior to 1974 ===
Its collection had previously formed part of the National Museum at Auberge de Provence. Following the split, the museum at the auberge was left with archaeological artifacts, and it was renamed the National Museum of Archaeology. The museum was managed by Heritage Malta.

=== National Museum of Fine Arts (1974–2016) ===
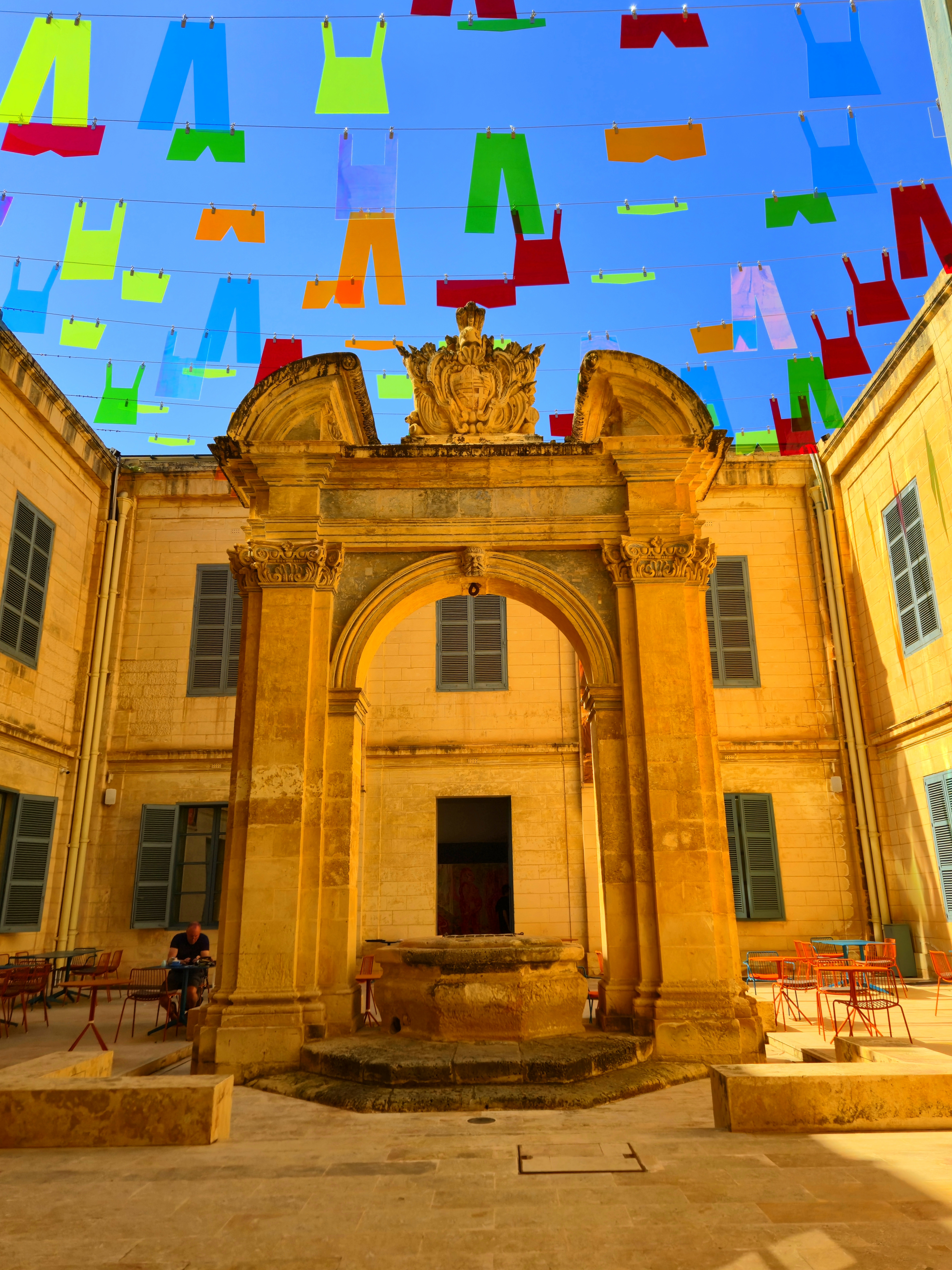
The courtyard inside MUŻA in 2026

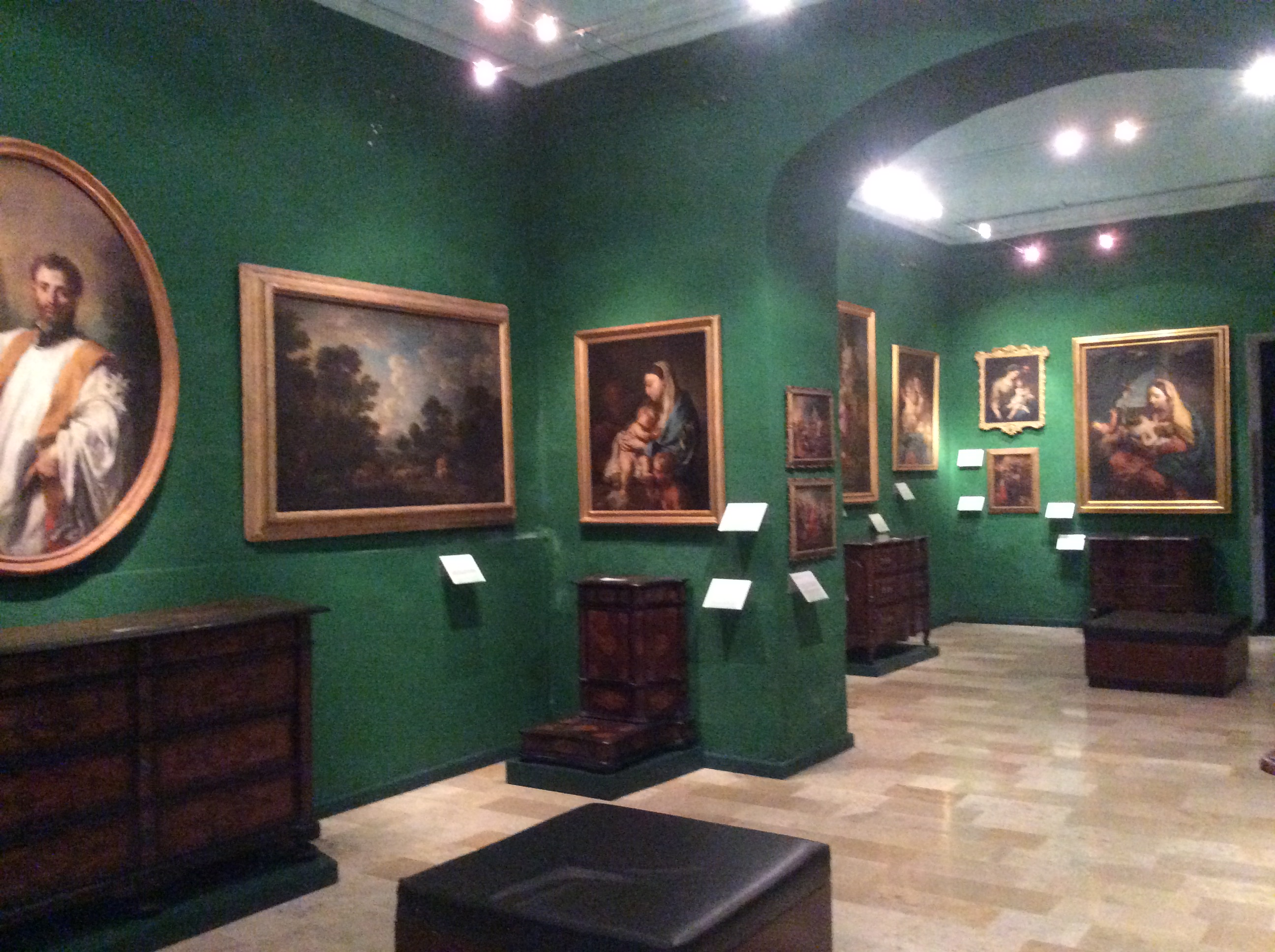
Interior of the National Museum of Fine Arts in 2016

The National Museum of Fine Arts, at the Admiralty House, was inaugurated by Minister of Education and Culture Agatha Barbara on 7 May 1974.

In 2013, plans began to be made to move the museum from Admiralty House to Auberge d'Italie. In September 2014, it was announced that the move will occur and the new museum would be called MUŻA (from the Maltese acronym Mużew Nazzjonali tal-Arti). The museum at Admiralty House closed down on 2 October 2016, and the new museum opened in 2018 as one of the projects of Valletta's title of European Capital of Culture.

The museum welcomed 30,000 patrons in 2012, and the relocation aimed to increase the number of visitors.

=== MUŻA (since 2018) ===
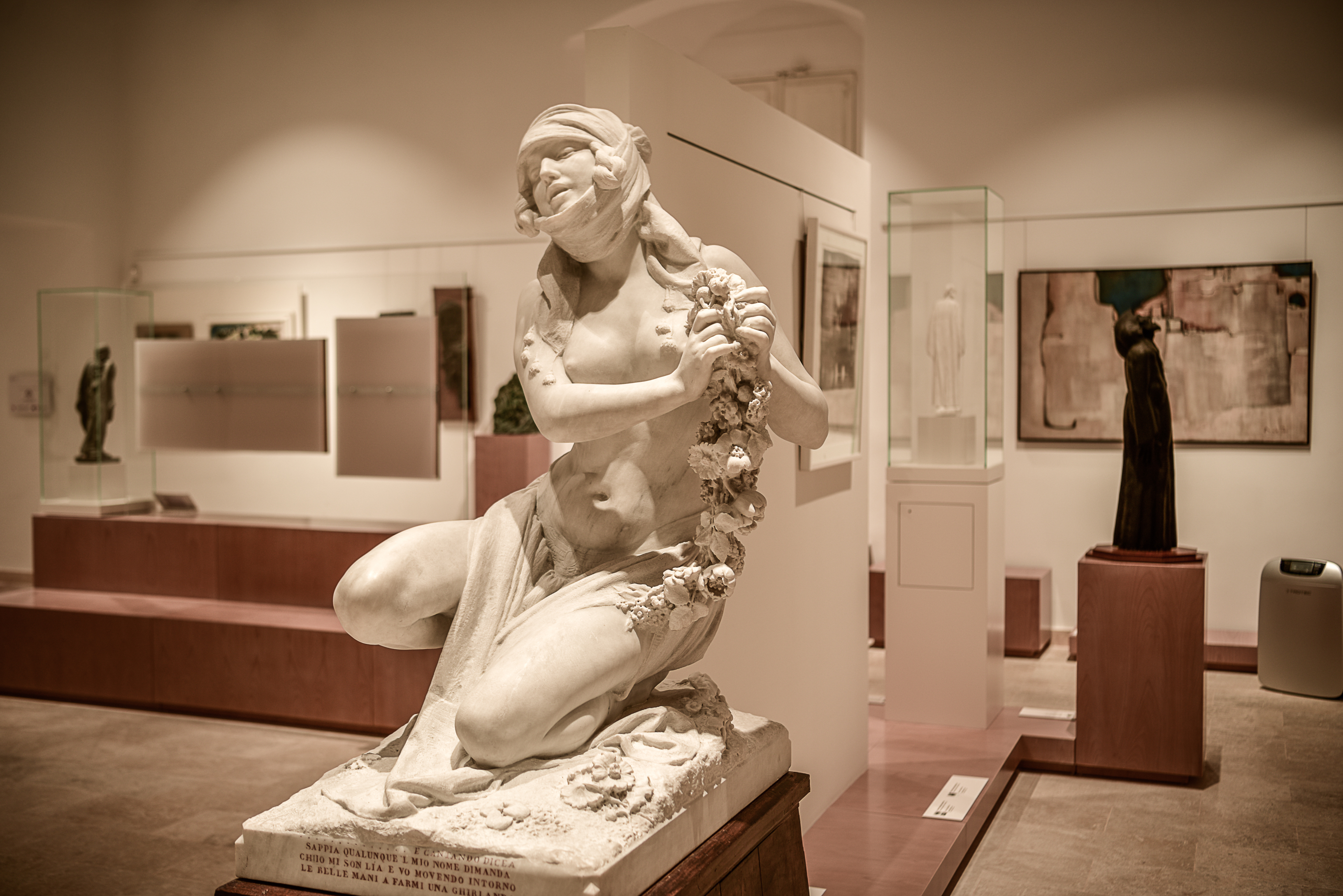
Interior of MUŻA in 2019

MUŻA opened on 10 November 2018.

== Location ==
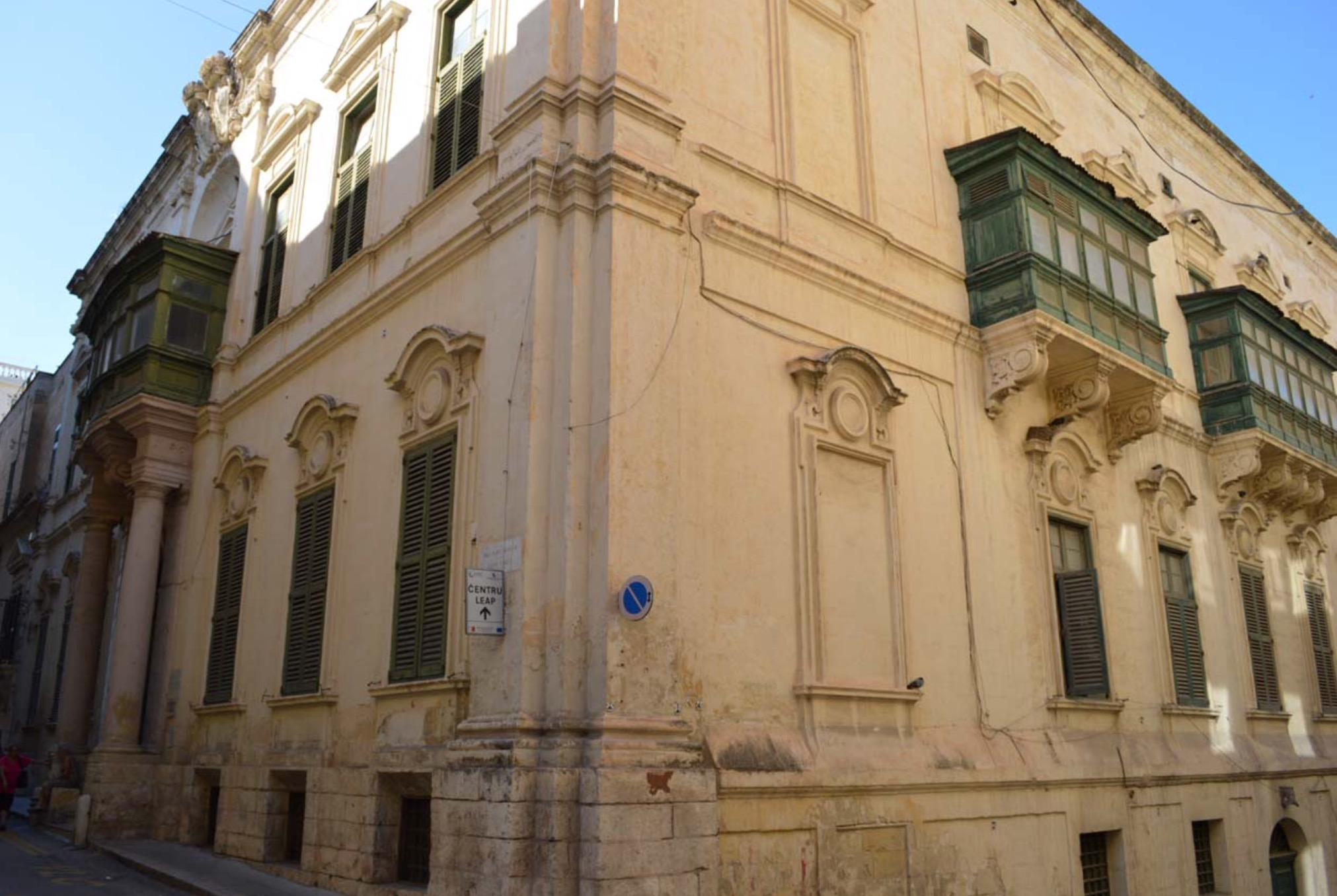
Admiralty House

The museum was housed at the Admiralty House, a palace in Valletta, originally built in the 16th century as a residence for the knight Fra Jean de Soubiran dit Arafat. The present building dates back to 1761–63, when it was reconstructed in the Baroque style for the Portuguese knight Fra Raimondo de Sousa y Silva. From 1821 to 1961, the building was the official residence of the Commander-in-Chief of the Mediterranean Fleet, hence the name Admiralty House.

Admiralty House is located at South Street in Valletta. Apart from the museum itself, the area contains several fine historical palaces dating from the times of the Order of St. John that are now used by government ministries and departments. It is also well known for its wine bars and cafes, and views of the city's grid-shaped streets.

== Collections ==
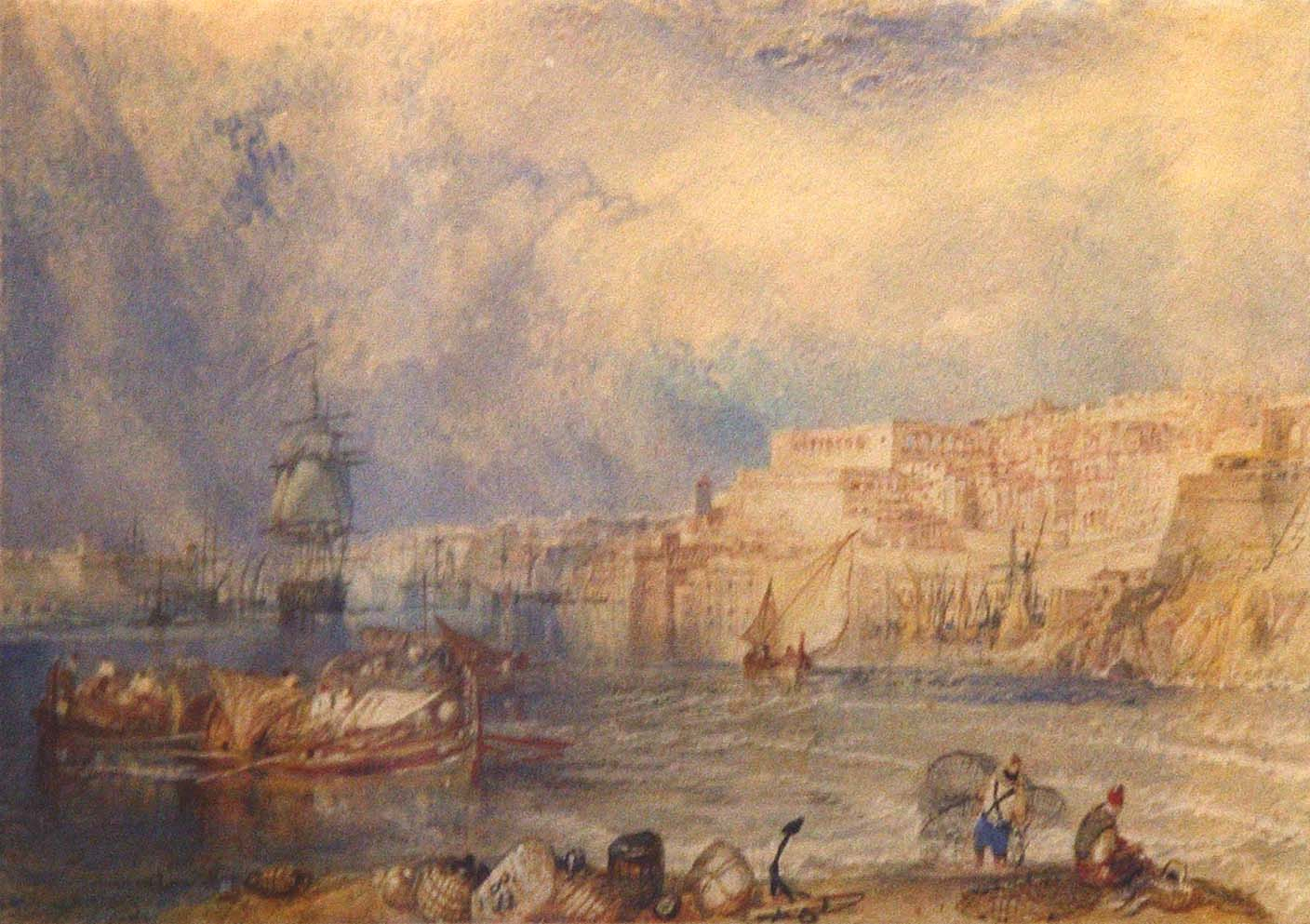
The Turner watercolour displayed in the museum.

=== Fine arts ===
The museum housed the major part of the national collection of Malta. The collection began in 1923 when the first fine arts curator, Vincenzo Bonello, embarked on establishing a collection within what was then called the National Museum. Bonello acquired numerous works of excellent quality on the local art market, and in London and Italy. Most were purchased at a time when prices in the art market where still within reach of the museum's modest budget. Public spirited individuals and organizations also left significant bequests.

The permanent display included the largest collection of paintings by the Southern Italian Baroque artist Mattia Preti (1613–1699), an Italian Knight of the Order of Malta who also contributed to the transformation of the interior of St. John’s Co-Cathedral in Valletta. This, together with a fine and rare collection of antique maps, represented one of the strengths of the collection.

The works of other artists on display included Guido Reni (1575–1642), the Caravaggisti Valentin de Boulogne (1591–1632), Giuseppe Ribera (1591–1662) and Matthias Stom (1600–1652), as well as Carlo Maratta (1625–1713) and Bernardo Strozzi (1581–1644). Works by Dutch, French and British artists were also on permanent display.

The collection also included the works of two outstanding Maltese sculptors, Melchiorre Gafà (1636–1667) and Antonio Sciortino (1879–1947), and a noteworthy group of Maltese landscapes. The Grand Harbour of Malta and its environs is the subject of a Joseph Mallord William Turner (1775–1851) watercolour. Other works by Edward Lear (1812–1888), Louis Ducros (1748–1810) and local artists representing the same subject were also on display.

=== Furniture and silverware ===
The museum exhibited a collection of Maltese furniture and silverware, as well as majolica jars mainly of Sicilian production. Many of the jars were in use at the Sacra Infermeria, the Hospital of the Order of St John. Ecclesiastical silverware was also on display, including a rare fifteenth century chalice of Parisian workmanship.

=== Temporary exhibitions ===
The museum had a very active calendar of temporary exhibitions mainly by Maltese artists. Museum curated exhibitions have included the following:

- Postage Stamp Artwork: Emvin Cremona (1919–1987) – Shaping a Modern Identity in Malta’s Philatelic Heritage (September–October 2010) showed original stamp artwork and graphic designs produced by Emvin Cremona, most of which were put on display for the first time.
- Pictures of the Floating World – Ukiyo-e Prints from the National Collection (December 2009) exhibited original Japanese Ukiyo-e from the national collection.
- Victor Pasmore in Malta (December 2008 – January 2009) exhibited abstract works by the international British artist Victor Pasmore from the museum collection and the Central Bank of Malta collection.
- The Maria Pasani Bequest (January – March 2008) exhibited eleven paintings by the Maltese artist Lazzaro Pisani donated by his daughter, Maria Pasani.

== See also ==
- List of museums in Malta
