= Amédée Faure =

French painter

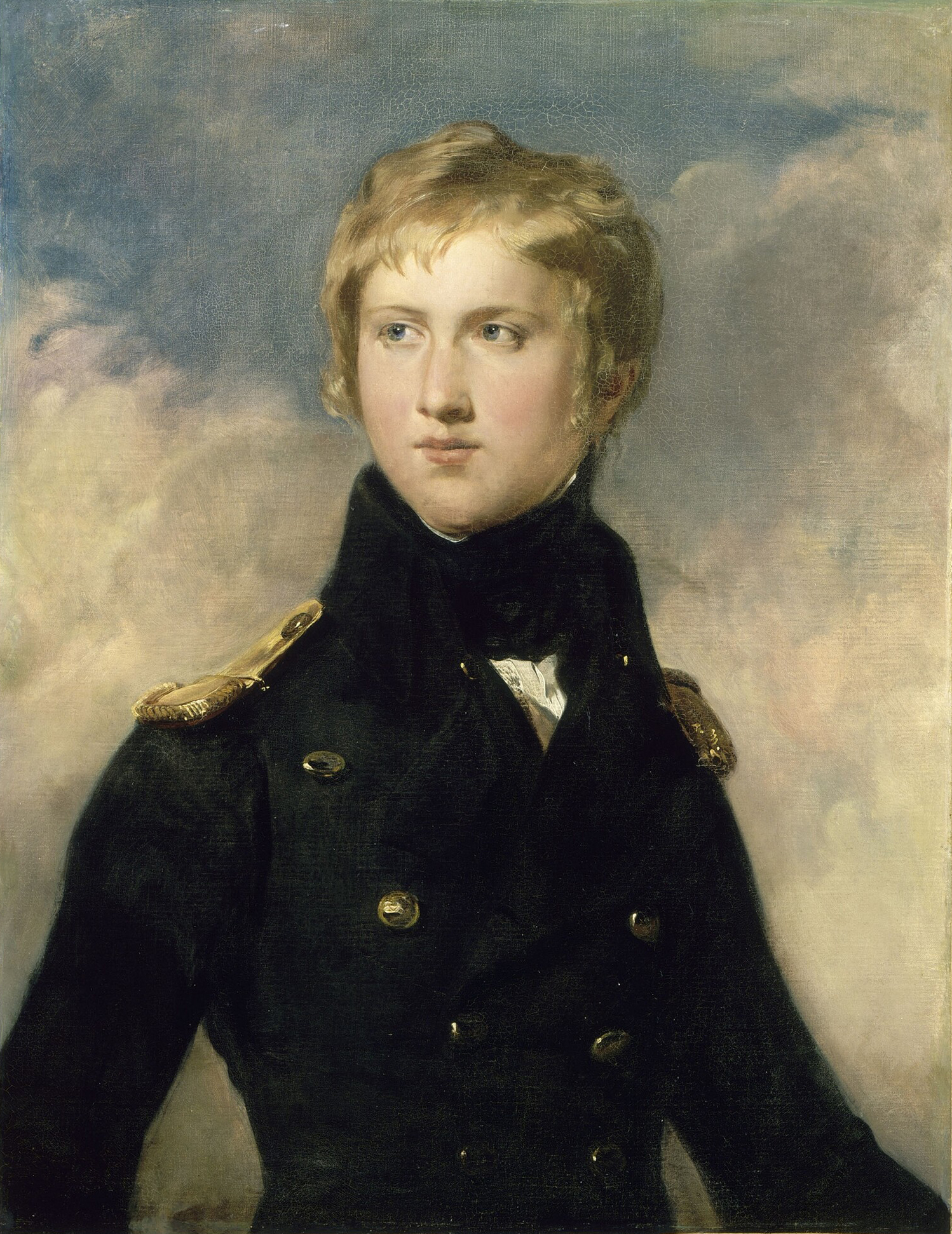
Antoine Philippe, Duke of Montpensier, in the uniform of a lieutenant-colonel, as adjutant general - portrait by Amédée Faure (Versailles, Musée national des Châteaux et Trianons)

Amédée Faure or Victor-Amédée Faure (French pronunciation: [viktɔʁ amede fɔʁ]; 1801–1878) was a French painter and portraitist. His portrait subjects include the brothers Louis-Charles, Count of Beaujolais and Antoine Philippe, Duke of Montpensier, and he also specialised in historic scenes of the House of Orléans and the July Monarchy.
