= Auberge d'Italie =

Auberge in Valletta, Malta

- Berġa tal-Italja
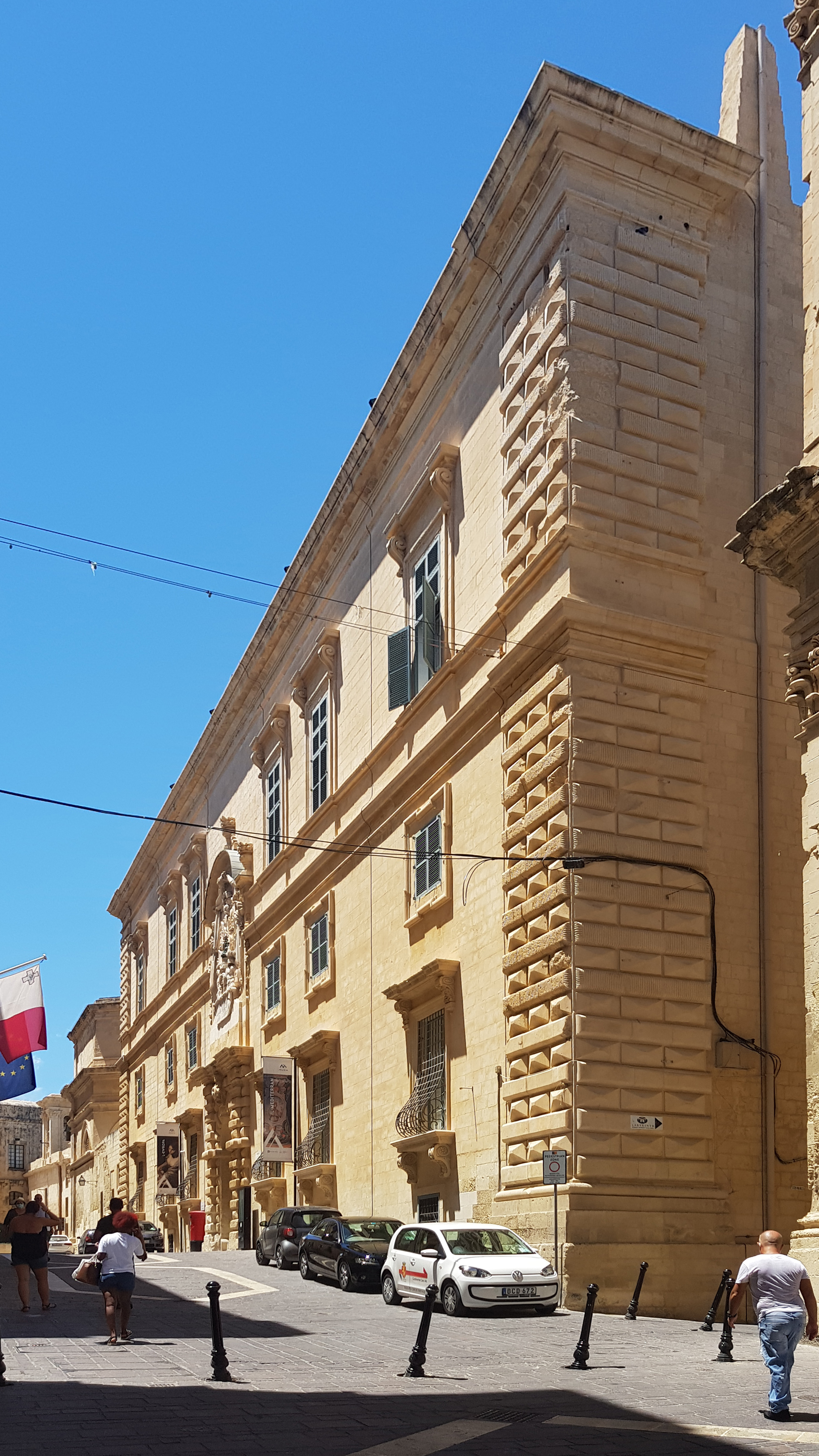
- Auberge d'Italie in 2020
- Interactive map of the Auberge d'Italie area

General information
- Status: Intact
- Type: Auberge
- Architectural style: Mannerist and Baroque
- Location: Valletta, Malta
- Coordinates: 35°53′47″N 14°30′41″E
- Current tenants: Heritage Malta
- Construction started: 1574
- Opened: September 1579
- Renovated: 1582–1595; 1680–1683
- Owner: Government of Malta

Technical details
- Material: Limestone (façade decorated with marble)
- Floor count: 3

Design and construction
- Architects: Girolamo Cassar; Gio Andrea Farrugia
- Engineer: Francesco Antrini

Renovating team
- Architect: Mederico Blondel

The Auberge d'Italie (Maltese: Berġa tal-Italja, Italian: Albergo d'Italia) is an auberge in Valletta, Malta. It was built in various stages in the late 16th century to house knights of the Order of Saint John from the langue of Italy, and it originally had a Mannerist design by Girolamo Cassar and several other architects. The building continued to be modified throughout the course of the 17th century, with the last major renovation being carried out in the 1680s during the magistracy of Gregorio Carafa, giving the building a Baroque character.

After the Order was expelled from Malta in 1798, the auberge was used for a number of purposes, housing a military headquarters, an officers' mess, a museum, a school of arts, a courthouse, the General Post Office and various government departments. Until recently, it housed the Malta Tourism Authority, and there are ongoing works of restoration. It is now converted to host the national collection (previously at National Museum of Fine Arts). In 2018 it became the new National Community Art Museum, MUŻA (from the Maltese acronym Mużew Nazzjonali tal-Arti).

== History ==
=== Hospitaller rule ===
Auberge d'Italie was the third Italian auberge to be built in Malta. The first auberge was built in Birgu in the 1550s, on the site of an earlier building which had been used by the Langue of Italy. Following the transfer of the capital city from Birgu to Valletta, a second auberge was built in the centre of the new city in 1570–71. This building was eventually incorporated into the Grandmaster's Palace, and the present auberge began to be built in Strada San Giacomo (now Merchants Street). The original designs of both Valletta auberges were made by the Maltese architect Girolamo Cassar.

There is no documentation recording the construction of the third Auberge d'Italie, but work began in 1574 and the building was inaugurated in September 1579. When the first floor was completed, construction of the rest of the building was suspended, but it soon became clear that the building was too small. On 25 August 1582, the decision to build a second floor was taken. Master mason Gio Andrea Farrugia was responsible for the construction, but he died before the project was completed. Construction continued throughout the 1580s, and was completed in around 1595. Apart from Cassar and Farrugia, several other architects and master masons were responsible for the construction of the auberge, including the engineer Francesco Antrini.

The Langue of Italy also built the Church of St. Catherine adjacent to the auberge. Construction of the church began in 1576, and it was enlarged and modified in 1683 and 1710.

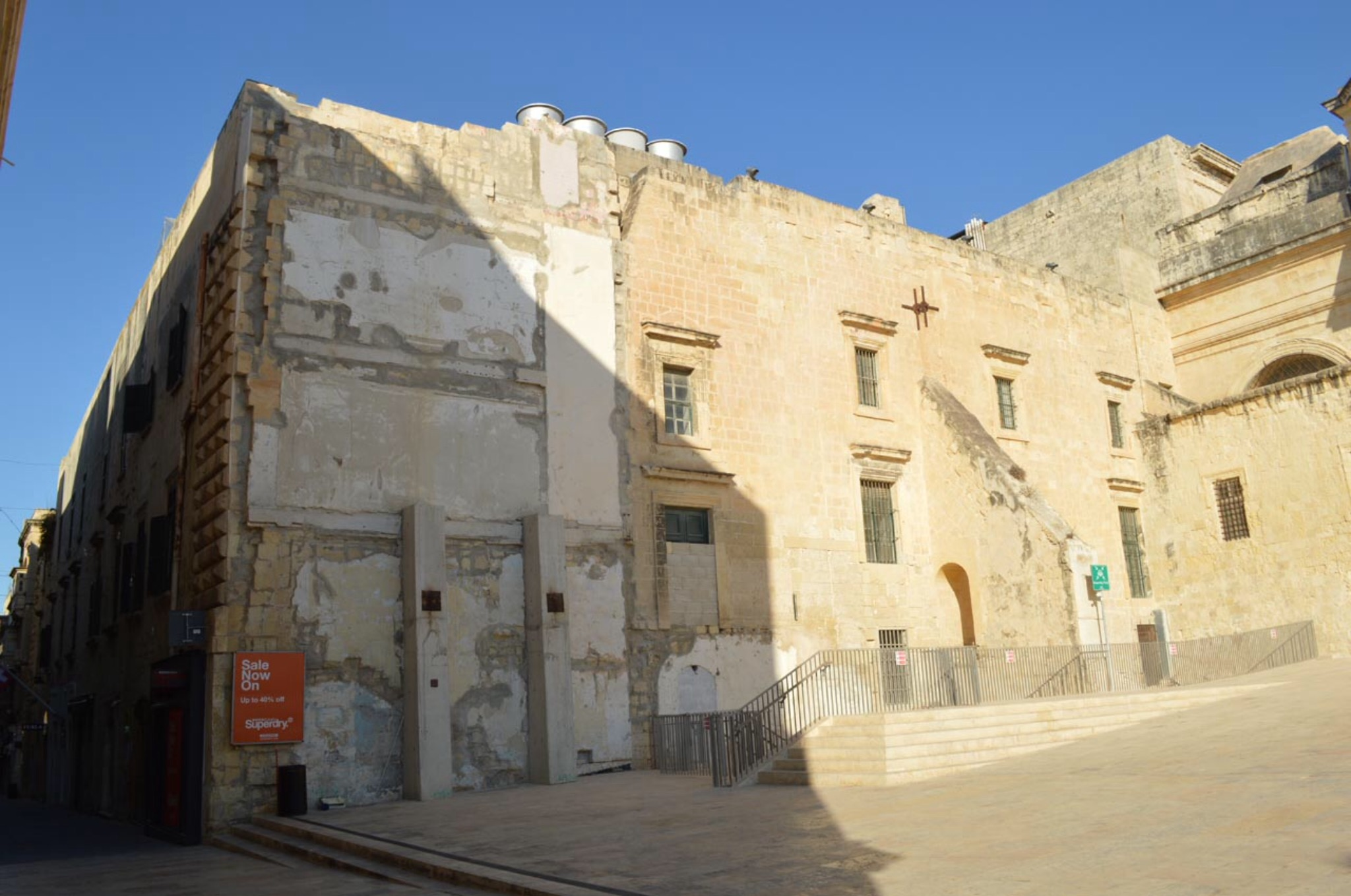
Side façade of Auberge d'Italie in Jean de Valette Square, which might have contained the main entrance prior to 1629

Some repairs were made in 1604 by Alessandro Stafrace, after cracks appeared in part of the Main Hall. The auberge had an entrance facing a square in South Street, but this was blocked in 1629 when the square was built up (the square was recreated in 2012 as Jean de Valette Square). Historian Giovanni Bonello suggests that this was the main entrance of the auberge, although it might have just been a side entrance. In 1649–50, a mezzanine was built beneath the Admiral's Room, and a large room at the rear of the building was converted into four shops in 1654. The archives were constructed in 1678.

A major renovation of the auberge in the Baroque style began in 1680. The façade was remodelled by Mederico Blondel, and a third floor was constructed at the expense of Grand Master Gregorio Carafa. An ornate centrepiece with a trophy of arms containing a bust of Carafa was added above the main entrance. The trophy was sculpted by Raymond de La Fage out of marble taken from the ruins of the Temple of Proserpina, an ancient Roman temple in Mtarfa which had been discovered in 1613.

=== French occupation and British rule ===
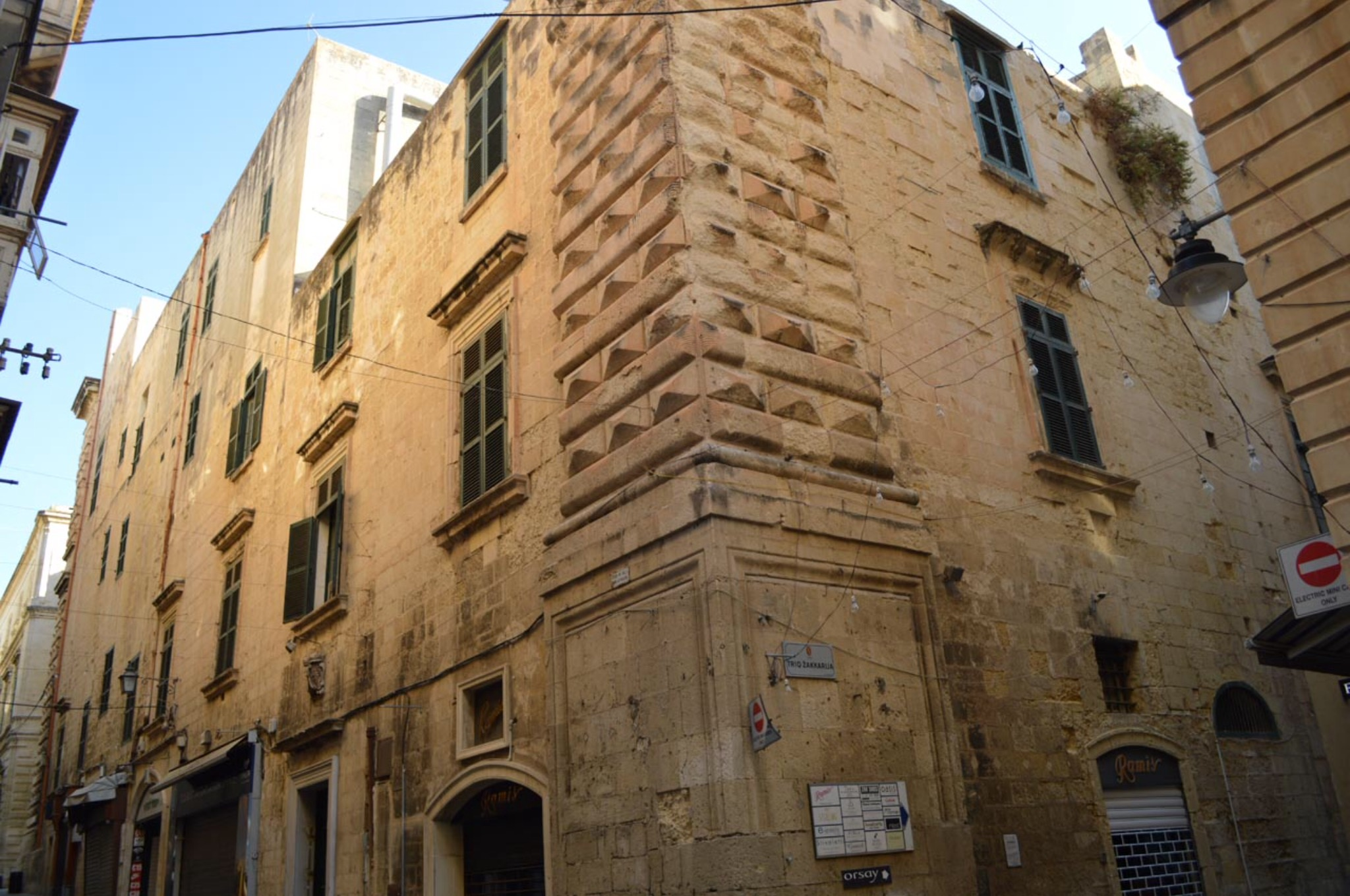
Rear view of Auberge d'Italie from the corner of Melita and Zachary Streets

The Order of St. John was expelled from Malta with the French invasion and occupation in 1798. Being located opposite Napoleon's residence at Palazzo Parisio, the auberge was converted into the French military command. After Malta fell under British rule in 1800, it was used by both the military and civil administrations. In 1888 the ground floor was used to store the notary archives and the upper floor was occupied by the Department of Work. It was converted into a Civil Arsenal. Plans to set a Protestant chapel was declined. At this point the ground floor also served as the Government Printing Office, while the upper floor was also used by the Royal Engineers. It later served as the Corps Headquarters and an officers' mess until the 1920s. In the early 19th century, chemist John Davy, who was in Malta with the Army Medical Staff, established a public dispensary at the auberge for the treatment of the poor and became known as the Albergo dei poveri (Auberge of the poor). The successor of this service, the Government Polyclinics, is still referred to as il-Berġa (the auberge).

In 1922, the National Museum was transferred from Palazzo Xara to Auberge d'Italie. The museum was directed by Sir Themistocles Zammit, and it was divided into archaeology, history, arts, natural history and mineralogical sections. The museum closed down during World War II, and the building received two direct hits on 7 April 1942. Part of the façade was destroyed by aerial bombardment, and the natural history collection suffered severe damage since it was located in the part of the building which was hit. Documents from the Notarial Archives were stored in the auberge's basement during the war, and some were damaged while they were there. After the war ended, the damaged parts of the auberge were reconstructed, the museum was reopened and part of the building housed a school of art.

The Museums Department had to vacate Auberge d'Italie in 1954, when the building was converted into a temporary courthouse after the Courts of Justice had to vacate the war-damaged Auberge d'Auvergne due to its dilapidated state. The Criminal Court was stationed at the Auberge.

=== Independent Malta ===
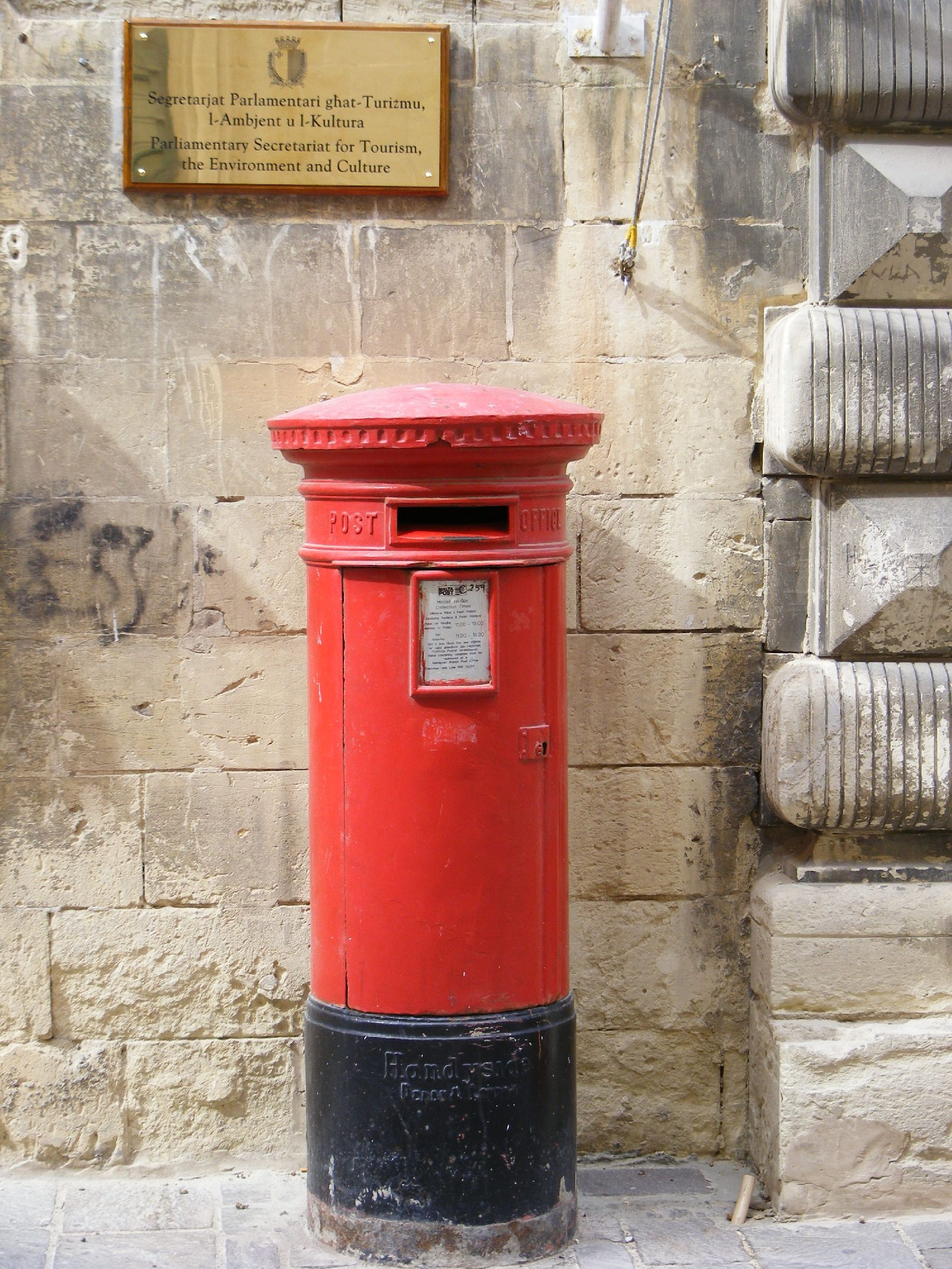
Pillar mail box near the auberge's main entrance

In January 1971, the Superior Courts of Justice and the School of Arts vacated the building after moving into a new courthouse which had been built on the site of Auberge d'Auvergne. The building was to be converted into an examination hall, but in August of that year, it was assigned to the Posts and Telephones Department. After extensive renovations, the auberge opened as the General Post Office on 4 July 1973, taking over the role from Palazzo Parisio. The auberge remained the GPO until Posta Limited opened a new complex at Marsa in October 1997. The auberge was also used by the Water and Electricity Department, the Agricultural Department and the Central Office of Statistics.

In 1997, the decision was taken to convert the auberge into the offices for the Ministry of Tourism and the Malta Tourism Authority. The building was redecorated and restored, and the Ministry moved into the building on 18 March 2002. The Malta Tourism Authority moved in on 1 March of the same year. The Ministry for Tourism has since moved to new premises in 233, Republic Street, Valletta.

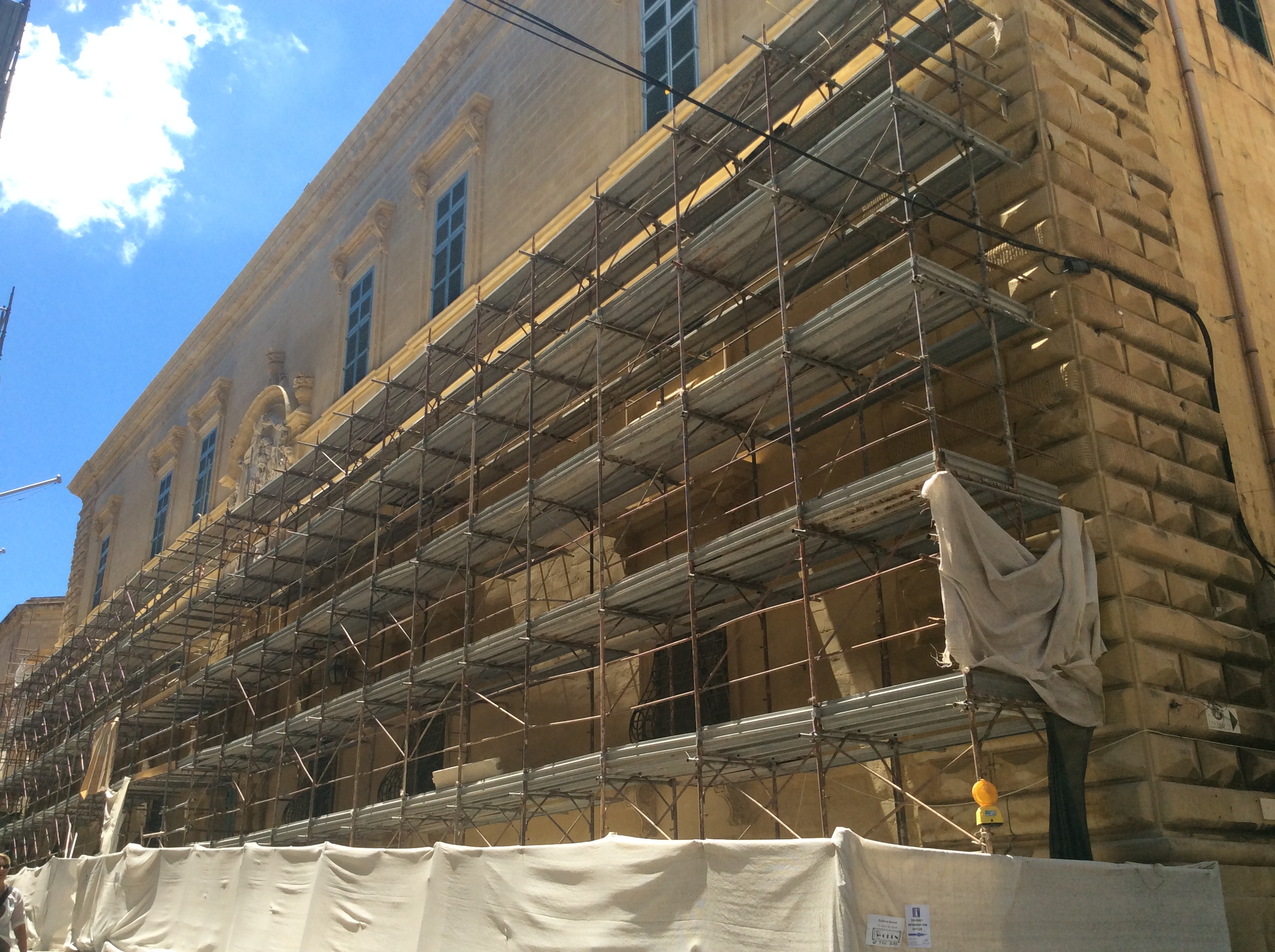
Restoration of Auberge d'Italie in July 2016

Plans to move the National Museum of Fine Arts from Admiralty House to Auberge d'Italie began in 2013. In September 2014, it was announced that the move will occur and the new museum would be called MUŻA (from the Maltese acronym Mużew Nazzjonali tal-Arti). It is one of the projects for Valletta's title of European Capital of Culture in 2018. The Malta Tourism Authority was set to move out of the auberge to premises in Smart City during November 2016 but the move was delayed until February 2017. The auberge's façade was restored between late 2015 and July 2016. Various artistic features from the centrepiece were revealed during this time, and Carafa's bust was also restored. The building's interior is also being restored. Another considered but refuted plan was to reopen the probable original entrance, that would have had an added front staircase on Piazza De Valette.

The building was included on the Antiquities List of 1925 together with the other auberges in Valletta. It is now scheduled as a Grade 1 national monument by the Malta Environment and Planning Authority, and it is also listed on the National Inventory of the Cultural Property of the Maltese Islands.

== Architecture ==
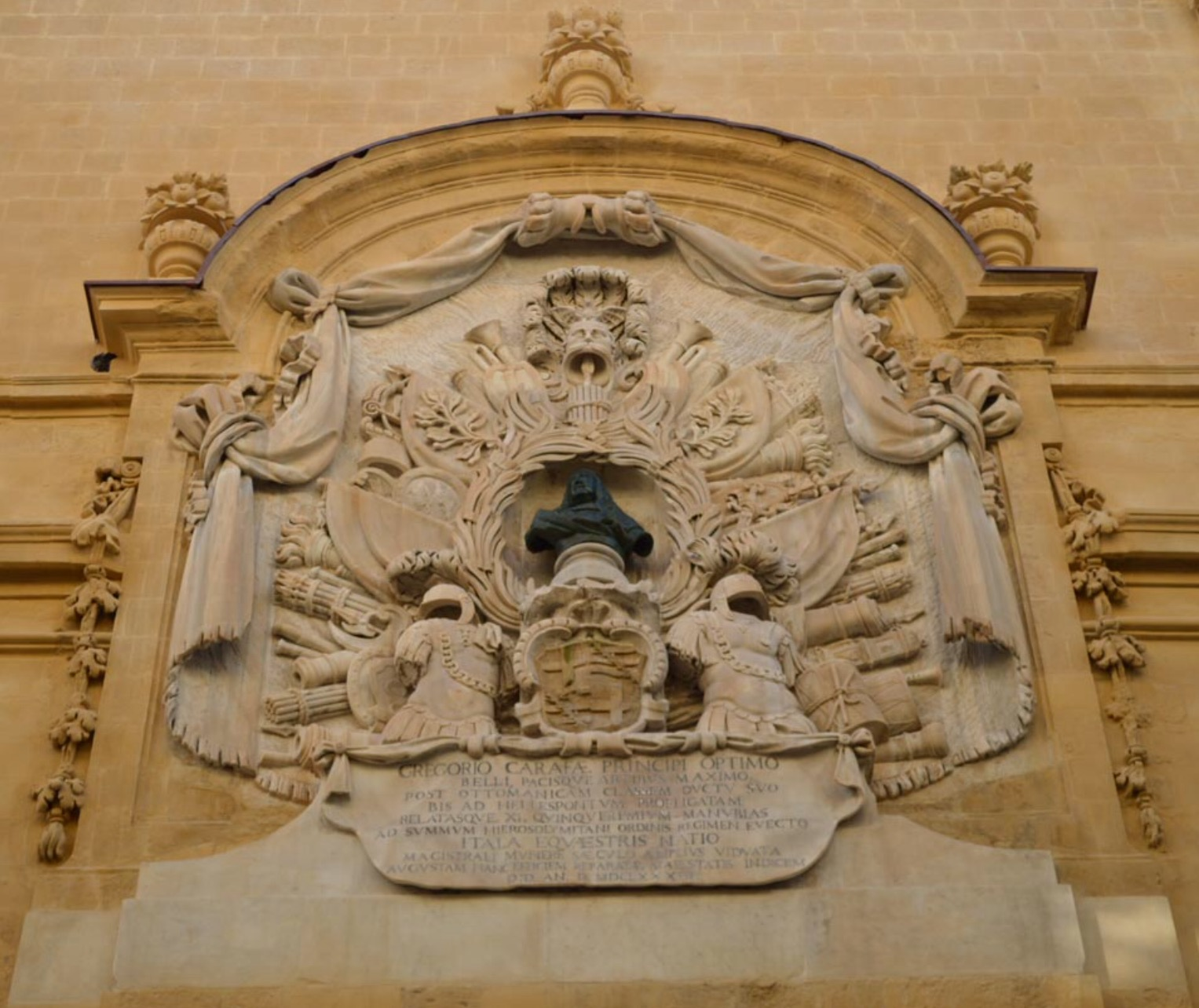
The centerpiece of the façade, after the 2016 restoration

Auberge d'Italie was originally built in the Mannerist style, but the building acquired a mainly Baroque character due to the 1680s renovation. The building has a rectangular plan with its rooms are built around a central courtyard, a layout typical of Italian Renaissance palazzi and Cassar's other auberges in Valletta such as Auberge d'Aragon. The courtyard contains a triumphal arch which is thought to have been designed by Romano Carapecchia.

It has a symmetrical façade with an ornate Baroque centrepiece above the main entrance, containing a bronze bust of Carafa and his coat of arms, together with a marble trophy-of-arms and a Latin inscription which reads:

GREGORIO CARAFÆ PRINCIPI OPTIMO

BELLI, PACISQVE ARTIBVS MAXIMO.
POST OTTOMANICAM CLASSEM DVCTV SVO
BIS AD HELLESPONTVM PROFLIGATAM
RELATASQVE. XI. QVINQVEREMIVM MANVBIAS
AD SVMMVM HIEROSOLYMITANI ORDINIS REGIMEN EVECTO
ITALA EQVÆSTRIS NATIO
MAGISTRALI MVNERE SÆCVLO AMPLIVS VIDVATA
AVGVSTAM HANC EFFIGIEM REPARATÆ MAIESTATIS INDICEM
D. D. AN. D. MDCLXXXIII. (Note: Translated as: "The renewed Italian nation has given as a gift to Gregory Carafa, the best prince of war and the greatest prince in the arts of peace, this Augustan effigy (statue) as a sign of his full majesty, because he has twice led the wanton Ottoman fleet to the Hellespont and brought back as spoils of war to the command of the Jerusalem forces 11 great ships (quinqueremes), in the year 1683.")

The centrepiece is thought to have been built by the architect Mederico Blondel based on a design by Mattia Preti. The main entrance and the corners of the building are rusticated. Each of the three floors contains a set of six windows, and a cornice runs along the façade between the first and second floors.

Auberge de'Italie is linked to Auberge de Castille across the street through a World War II-era underground air-raid shelter.

== Commemorative coins ==
Auberge d'Italie was depicted on two commemorative coins minted in 2010 by the Central Bank of Malta. The coins show the centrepiece of the building's façade on the reverse and the coat of arms of Malta on the obverse.
