= Auberge d'Italie, Birgu =

Auberge d'Italie
- Berġa tal-Italja
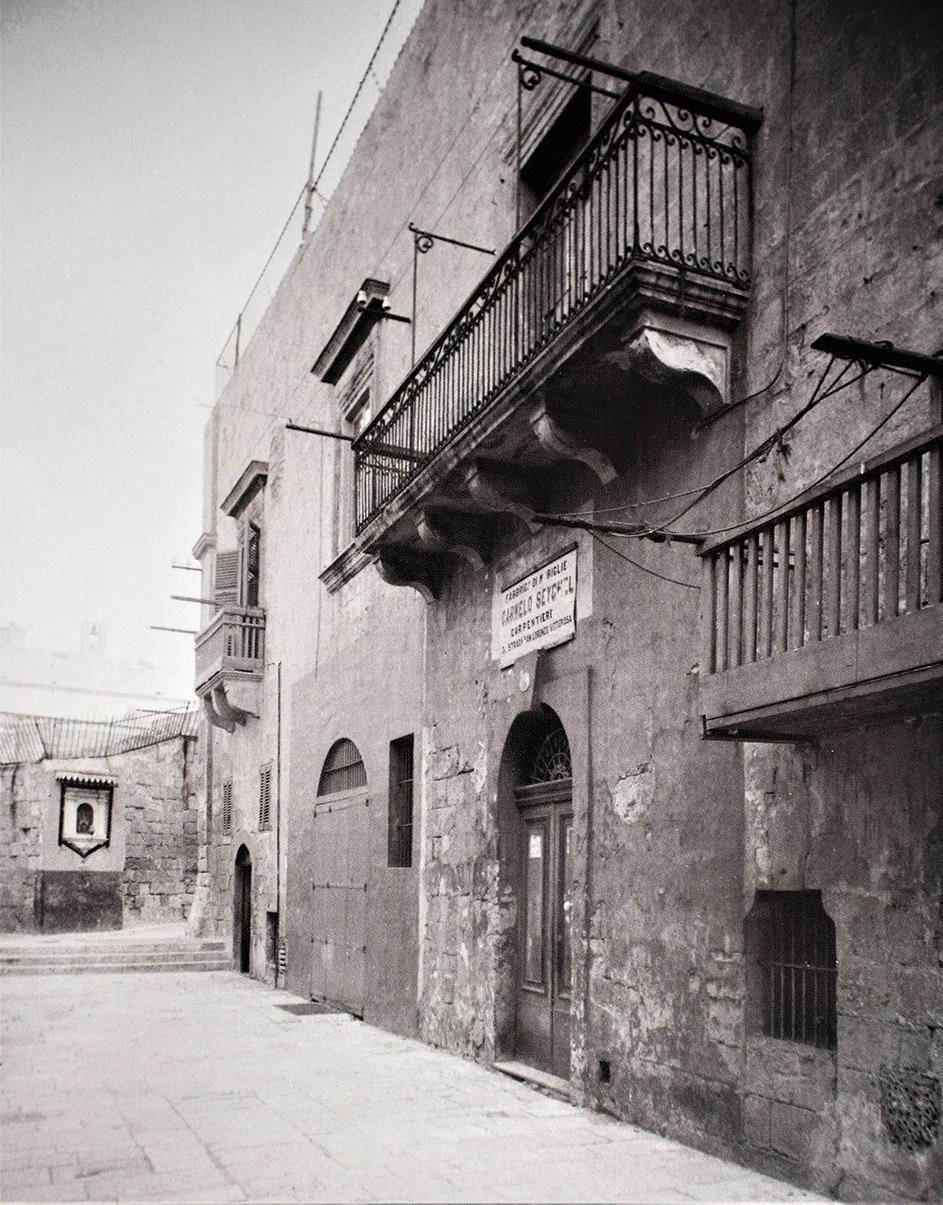
- The building in the 1900s, being used as a furniture factory
- Interactive map of the Auberge d'Italie area

General information
- Status: Largely destroyed, some remains survive
- Type: Auberge
- Location: Birgu, Malta, No. 1–6, St. Lawrence Street
- Coordinates: 35°53′25.8″N 14°31′11″E
- Construction started: 1553
- Completed: 1554
- Destroyed: 1940s

Technical details
- Material: Limestone

Design and construction
- Architect: Niccolò Bellavante

The Auberge d'Italie (Maltese: Berġa tal-Italja, Italian: Albergo d'Italia) was an auberge in Birgu, Malta. It was built in the sixteenth century to house knights of the Order of Saint John from the langue of Italy.

== History ==
=== Auberge ===
The auberge was located in the northern part of Birgu, close to Fort St. Angelo and far from the collacchio where the other auberges were found. It was built between 1553 and 1554 to a design by Niccolò Bellavante, on the site of an earlier auberge. Part of the building was used as a naval hospital, and it also included a chapel dedicated to St. Catherine of Alexandria.

=== Adaptive reuse ===
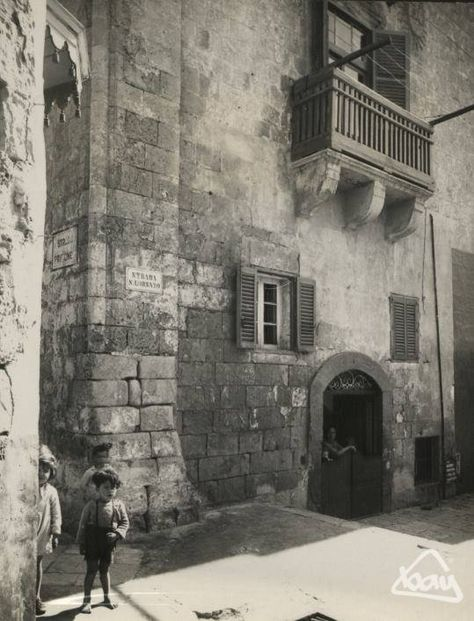
The building c. 1935

The auberge remained in use until April 1571, when the Italian knights moved to a larger Auberge d'Italie in the new capital city Valletta. This auberge was later incorporated into the Grandmaster's Palace, and a third Auberge d'Italie was built in 1579. A Church of St. Catherine was also built adjacent to the third auberge.

In the 1900s or before, the building was the host of the Fabbrica di Mobiglia Carmelo Seychel Carpentiere. A photo by Richard Ellis is publicly available, portraying the full facade. Another photograph of the building was taken circa 1935, when part of the building was a residence.

== Architecture and remains ==
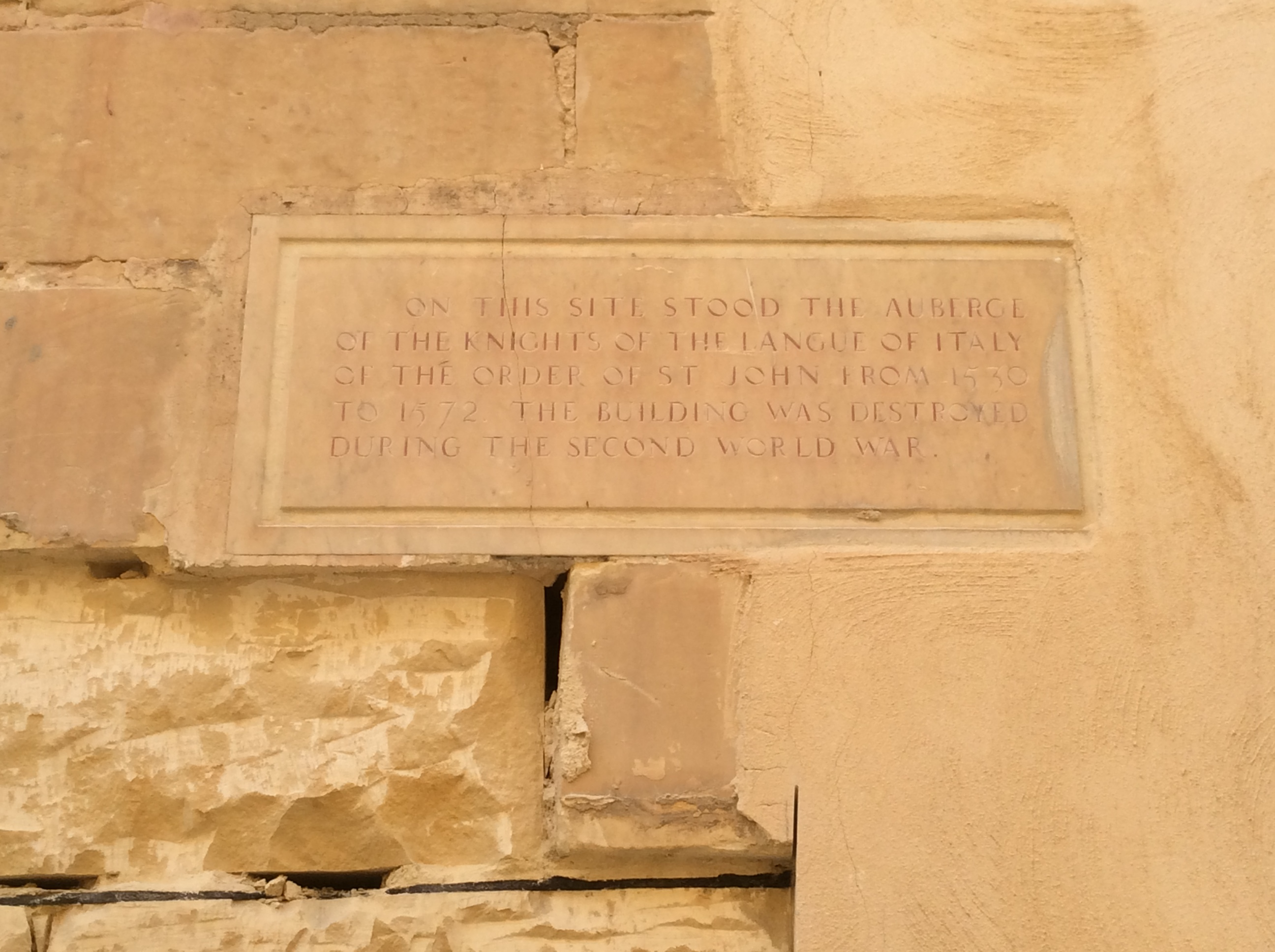
A plaque on the present building commemorates the former building, which incorporated the remains.

Auberge d'Italie was included on the Antiquities List of 1925, together with the other auberges in Birgu.

The building was severely damaged by aerial bombardment during World War II. The site was rebuilt as housing units between 1961 and 1963, and some features of the auberge were incorporated into the new buildings. These houses are regarded as being of a sub-standard nature.

Today, the only remains of the auberge are a quoin, a partially defaced coat of arms, the base of a balcony, and some mouldings on the façade. These remains were scheduled as a Grade 2 property on 2 December 2009, and they are also listed on the National Inventory of the Cultural Property of the Maltese Islands.
