= List of monuments in Valletta =

This is a list of monuments in Valletta, Malta, which are listed on the National Inventory of the Cultural Property of the Maltese Islands.

== List ==
Name of object	Location	Coordinates	ID	Photo	Upload
Our Lady of Victory Church	Triq in-Nofsinhar	35°53′46″N 14°30′39″E	00035	Our Lady of Victory Church	Upload Photo
Lascaris War Rooms	Main Ditch	35°53′41″N 14°30′41″E	00048	Lascaris War Rooms	Upload Photo
Niche of St. Publius	Old Custom House, Xatt Lascaris	35°53′39″N 14°30′46″E	00514	Niche of St. Publius	Upload Photo
Chapel of the Carmelite Madonna	Lascaris War Rooms (tunnel)	35°53′40″N 14°30′47″E	00515	Chapel of the Carmelite Madonna	Upload Photo
Church of the Madonna of Liesse	Telgħet Liesse	35°53′42″N 14°30′48″E	00516	Church of the Madonna of Liesse	Upload Photo
Relief of the Baptism of Christ with St. John the Baptist	over the stairs from Triq il-Lvant to Triq il-Batterija	35°53′46″N 14°30′48″E	00517	Relief of the Baptism of Christ with St. John the Baptist	Upload Photo
Niche of the Madonna of Sorrows	Triq Sant'Ursola (side wall of Ta'Ġieżu church)	35°53′47″N 14°30′48″E	00518	Niche of the Madonna of Sorrows	Upload Photo
Niche of St. Anthony	Triq Sant'Ursola c/w Triq San Ġwann	35°53′47″N 14°30′48″E	00519	Niche of St. Anthony	Upload Photo
Church of the Madonna of Jesus	Triq San Ġwann	35°53′47″N 14°30′48″E	00520	Church of the Madonna of Jesus	Upload Photo
Statue of St. Francis	Triq Sant'Ursola c/w Triq Santa Luċija	35°53′48″N 14°30′51″E	00521	Statue of St. Francis	Upload Photo
Statue of St. Francis of Paola	Triq Santa Luċija c/w Triq il-Lvant	35°53′48″N 14°30′51″E	00522	Statue of St. Francis of Paola	Upload Photo
Church of St. Lucy	Triq il-Lvant	35°53′47″N 14°30′52″E	00523	Church of St. Lucy	Upload Photo
Niche of the Madonna of Loreto	222 Triq Sant'Ursola	35°53′49″N 14°30′53″E	00524	Niche of the Madonna of Loreto	Upload Photo
Church of St. Ursola	Triq Sant'Ursola c/w Triq L-Arċisqof	35°53′51″N 14°30′56″E	00525	Church of St. Ursola	Upload Photo
Niche of St Michael	90 Triq Sant'Ursola c/w 153 Triq L-Arċisqof	35°53′52″N 14°30′56″E	00526	Niche of St Michael	Upload Photo
Relief of St. Paul	196 Triq Sant'Ursola	35°53′52″N 14°30′58″E	00527	Relief of St. Paul	Upload Photo
Church of St. Roque	107 Triq Sant'Ursola	35°53′53″N 14°30′58″E	00528	Church of St. Roque	Upload Photo
Niche of St Roque	112 Triq Sant'Ursola c/w 14 Triq San Kristofru	35°53′53″N 14°30′59″E	00529	Niche of St Roque	Upload Photo
Niche of the Madonna of Sorrows	Triq Sant'Ursola c/w 160 Triq San Duminku	35°53′54″N 14°31′01″E	00530	Niche of the Madonna of Sorrows	Upload Photo
Niche of the Madonna of Lourdes	Triq Sant'Ursola c/w Triq San Nikola	35°53′56″N 14°31′03″E	00531	Niche of the Madonna of Lourdes	Upload Photo
Statue of St. Paul	Triq San Nikola c/w Triq L-Ibjar	35°53′55″N 14°31′04″E	00532	Statue of St. Paul	Upload Photo
Niche of St. Francis of Paola	144 Triq San Nikola c/w 151 Triq San Pawl	35°53′57″N 14°31′01″E	00533	Niche of St. Francis of Paola	Upload Photo
Niche of St. Dominic	89 Triq il-Merkanti c/w Triq San Duminku	35°53′57″N 14°30′58″E	00534	Niche of St. Dominic	Upload Photo
Church of the Madonna of Fair Havens	Triq il-Merkanti c/w Triq San Duminku	35°53′58″N 14°30′58″E	00535	Church of the Madonna of Fair Havens	Upload Photo
Church of St. Nicholas	Triq il-Merkanti c/w Triq San Nikola	35°53′59″N 14°31′01″E	00536	Church of St. Nicholas	Upload Photo
Niche of St. Dominic	53 Triq San Nikola	35°53′59″N 14°30′59″E	00537	Niche of St. Dominic	Upload Photo
Niche of the Madonna of the Rosary	57 Triq San Nikola	35°54′00″N 14°30′58″E	00538	Niche of the Madonna of the Rosary	Upload Photo
Church of Mary Magdalene	Triq il-Merkanti c/w Triq it-Tramuntana	35°54′01″N 14°31′03″E	00539	Church of Mary Magdalene	Upload Photo
Church of St. Anne	Fort Saint Elmo (Piazza)	35°54′07″N 14°31′09″E	00540	Church of St. Anne	Upload Photo
Chapel of St. Anne	Fort Saint Elmo (fortifications)	35°54′06″N 14°31′08″E	00541	Chapel of St. Anne	Upload Photo
Niche of the Madonna of Pompei	11 Misraħ Sant'Iermu	35°54′04″N 14°31′04″E	00542	Niche of the Madonna of Pompei	Upload Photo
Niche of the Madonna of the Rosary	Sqaq Toni Bajada	35°54′03″N 14°31′03″E	00543	Niche of the Madonna of the Rosary	Upload Photo
Niche of St Joseph	54 Triq San Ġużepp c/w Triq L-Infermerija	35°54′03″N 14°30′58″E	00544	Niche of St Joseph	Upload Photo
Niche of St. Dominic	104 Triq ir-Repubblika c/w 74 Triq L-Infermerija	35°54′02″N 14°30′59″E	00545	Niche of St. Dominic	Upload Photo
Chapel of the Presentation of the Madonna	225 Triq ir-Repubblika	35°54′00″N 14°30′54″E	00546	Chapel of the Presentation of the Madonna	Upload Photo
Church of the Blessed Sacrament	146 Triq San Kristofru	35°53′57″N 14°30′56″E	00547	Church of the Blessed Sacrament	Upload Photo
Niche of the Madonna of All Souls	Triq il-Ġendus c/w Triq il-Ajkla	35°54′03″N 14°30′50″E	00548	Niche of the Madonna of All Souls	Upload Photo
Niche of the Madonna of Mount Carmel	Triq San Kristofru (opposite Triq iż-Żekka)	35°54′03″N 14°30′49″E	00549	Niche of the Madonna of Mount Carmel	Upload Photo
Niche of the Madonna of the Rosary	Triq San Karlu	35°54′04″N 14°30′50″E	00550	Niche of the Madonna of the Rosary	Upload Photo
Church of the Madonna of Pilar	Triq il-Punent	35°54′04″N 14°30′46″E	00551	Church of the Madonna of Pilar	Upload Photo
St. Paul's Anglican Cathedral	Misraħ Indipendenza	35°54′03″N 14°30′43″E	00552	St. Paul's Anglican Cathedral	Upload Photo
Niche of the Madonna of Mount Carmel			00553	Niche of the Madonna of Mount Carmel	Upload Photo
Statue of St. Elias	55 Triq iż-Żekka c/w Triq it-Teatru L-Antiq	35°54′00″N 14°30′44″E	00554	Statue of St. Elias	Upload Photo
Niche of the Madonna of Mount Carmel	56 Triq iż-Żekka c/w Triq it-Teatru L-Antiq	35°54′00″N 14°30′44″E	00555	Niche of the Madonna of Mount Carmel	Upload Photo
Church of the Carmelites	Triq it-Teatru l-Antik c/w Triq iż-Żekka	35°54′01″N 14°30′44″E	00556	Church of the Carmelites	Upload Photo
Niche of the Madonna of Mount Carmel	Triq il-Punent c/w Triq it-Teatru l-Antik	35°54′01″N 14°30′42″E	00557	Niche of the Madonna of Mount Carmel	Upload Photo
Niche of St Joseph	127 Triq il-Punent c/w Triq it-Teatru l-Antik	35°54′01″N 14°30′43″E	00558	Niche of St Joseph	Upload Photo
Niche of the Madonna of Mount Carmel	Triq tal-Karmnu	35°53′59″N 14°30′42″E	00559	Niche of the Madonna of Mount Carmel	Upload Photo
Niche of the Sacred Heart of Jesus	48 Triq il-Fran c/w Triq Santa Luċija	35°53′57″N 14°30′43″E	00560	Niche of the Sacred Heart of Jesus	Upload Photo
Statue of St. Augustine	Triq il-Fran c/w Triq San Ġwann	35°53′55″N 14°30′40″E	00561	Statue of St. Augustine	Upload Photo
Church of St. Augustine	Triq il-Fran c/w Triq San Ġwann	35°53′55″N 14°30′39″E	00562	Church of St. Augustine	Upload Photo
Niche of the Madonna of Mount Carmel	135 Triq iż-Żekka	35°53′56″N 14°30′38″E	00563	Niche of the Madonna of Mount Carmel	Upload Photo
Niche of St. Rita	1 Triq San Patrizju c/w Triq San Mark	35°53′56″N 14°30′36″E	00564	Niche of St. Rita	Upload Photo
Niche of the Immaculate Conception	Triq Melita c/w Triq id-Dejqa	35°53′52″N 14°30′38″E	00565	Niche of the Immaculate Conception	Upload Photo
Statue of St. Francis of Assisi	Triq Melita c/w Triq ir-Repubblika	35°53′50″N 14°30′39″E	00566	Statue of St. Francis of Assisi	Upload Photo
Church of St. Francis	Triq ir-Repubblika c/w Triq Melita	35°53′50″N 14°30′39″E	00567	Church of St. Francis	Upload Photo
Church of St. Barbara	Triq ir-Repubblika	35°53′49″N 14°30′39″E	00568	Church of St. Barbara	Upload Photo
Church of St. Catherine of the Langue of Italy	Misraħ il-Vittoria c/w Triq il-Merkanti	35°53′47″N 14°30′40″E	00569	Church of St. Catherine of the Langue of Italy	Upload Photo
Church of St. James	Triq il-Merkanti c/w Triq Melita	35°53′48″N 14°30′42″E	00570	Church of St. James	Upload Photo
Niche of St Paul	181 Triq Melita	35°53′49″N 14°30′41″E	00571	Niche of St Paul	Upload Photo
Niche of St. Peter of Alcantara	Triq San Pawl c/w Triq San Ġwann	35°53′48″N 14°30′47″E	00572	Niche of St. Peter of Alcantara	Upload Photo
Niche of St Paul	72 Triq San Pawl c/w Triq Santa Luċija	35°53′50″N 14°30′49″E	00573	Niche of St Paul	Upload Photo
Niche of St. John the Baptist	71 Triq San Pawl c/w Triq Santa Luċija	35°53′50″N 14°30′49″E	00574	Niche of St. John the Baptist	Upload Photo
Church of St. Paul's Shipwreck	Triq San Pawl	35°53′51″N 14°30′50″E	00575	Church of St. Paul's Shipwreck	Upload Photo
Niche of St. Francis Borgia	Triq il-Merkanti c/w Triq L-Arċisqof	35°53′54″N 14°30′54″E	00576	Niche of St. Francis Borgia	Upload Photo
Church of the Jesuits	Triq il-Merkanti	35°53′55″N 14°30′55″E	00577	Church of the Jesuits	Upload Photo
Niche of St. Aloysius Gonzaga	Triq San Pawl c/w Triq L-Arċisqof	35°53′53″N 14°30′55″E	00578	Niche of St. Aloysius Gonzaga	Upload Photo
Statue of the Madonna	Triq L-Arċisqof (side wall of Jesuit Church)	35°53′54″N 14°30′54″E	00579	Statue of the Madonna	Upload Photo
Statue of St. Stanislaus Kostka	Triq San Pawl c/w Triq San Kristofru	35°53′55″N 14°30′57″E	00580	Statue of St. Stanislaus Kostka	Upload Photo
Niche of St. Francis Xavier	79 Triq il-Merkanti c/w Triq San Kristofru	35°53′56″N 14°30′56″E	00581	Niche of St. Francis Xavier	Upload Photo
Statue of St. Ignatius of Loyola	Triq il-Merkanti	35°53′55″N 14°30′55″E	00582	Statue of St. Ignatius of Loyola	Upload Photo
Auberge D'Aragon	59 Triq L-Arċisqof (Misraħ L-Indipendenza)	35°54′04″N 14°30′45″E	01125	Auberge D'Aragon	Upload Photo
Municipal Palace - Banca Guratale	196 Triq il-Merkanti	35°53′52″N 14°30′49″E	01126	Municipal Palace - Banca Guratale	Upload Photo
Auberge de Castille et Leon	Misraħ Kastilja	35°53′45″N 14°30′40″E	01127	Auberge de Castille et Leon	Upload Photo
Auberge de Baviere	Triq San Bastjan	35°54′06″N 14°30′51″E	01128	Auberge de Baviere	Upload Photo
Auberge D'Italie	229 Triq il-Merkanti	35°53′47″N 14°30′41″E	01129	Auberge D'Italie	Upload Photo
St.John's Co-Cathedral	Misraħ San Ġwann	35°53′51″N 14°30′45″E	01130	St.John's Co-Cathedral	Upload Photo
Palazzo Parisio	Triq il-Merkanti	35°53′47″N 14°30′42″E	01131	Palazzo Parisio	Upload Photo
Castellania	11-19 Triq il-Merkanti	35°53′47″N 14°30′42″E	01132	Castellania	Upload Photo
Museum of Fine Arts	52 Triq in-Nofsinhar	35°53′54″N 14°30′33″E	01133	Museum of Fine Arts	Upload Photo
Grandmaster Palace	247 Triq ir-Repubblika	35°53′56″N 14°30′49″E	01134	Grandmaster Palace	Upload Photo
Auberge de Provence	Triq ir-Repubblika	35°53′51″N 14°30′40″E	01135	Auberge de Provence	Upload Photo
Palazzo De La Salle	219 Triq ir-Repubblica	35°54′01″N 14°30′56″E	01136	Palazzo De La Salle	Upload Photo
Sacra Infermeria	Triq it-Tramuntana c/w Triq il-Mediterran	35°53′59″N 14°31′05″E	01137	Sacra Infermeria	Upload Photo
Barriera Stores	ix-Xatt il-Barriera	35°53′49″N 14°30′59″E	01138	Barriera Stores	Upload Photo
Old University	Triq San Pawl c/w Triq San Kristofru	35°53′54″N 14°30′56″E	01139	Old University	Upload Photo
Manoel Theatre	110 Triq it-Teatru l-Antik	35°54′00″N 14°30′45″E	01140	Manoel Theatre	Upload Photo
Bibliotheca	Misraħ ir-Repubblica	35°53′54″N 14°30′49″E	01141	Bibliotheca	Upload Photo
Cancelleria	Misraħ San Ġorġ	35°53′58″N 14°30′48″E	01142	Cancelleria	Upload Photo
Triton Fountain	Putirjal	35°53′44″N 14°30′30″E	01143	Triton Fountain	Upload Photo
Great Siege Monument	Misraħ l-Assedju l-Kbir	35°53′53″N 14°30′45″E	01144	Great Siege Monument	Upload Photo
Palazzo Caraffa	95 Triq il-Fran c/w Triq San Kristofru	35°54′02″N 14°30′50″E	01145	Palazzo Caraffa	Upload Photo
Valletta	Valletta	35°53′56″N 14°30′46″E	01572	Valletta	Upload Photo
St. John Bastion	Triq il-Papa Piju V, Hastings Gardens	35°53′49″N 14°30′30″E	01573	St. John Bastion	Upload Photo
St. John Cavalier	Triq il-Papa Piju V c/w Triq il-Kavallier ta' San Ġwann	35°53′50″N 14°30′32″E	01574	St. John Cavalier	Upload Photo
St. James Cavalier	Triq il-Papa Piju V c/w Misraħ Kastilja	35°53′45″N 14°30′37″E	01575	St. James Cavalier	Upload Photo
Porta Reale Curtain	Putirjal	35°53′45″N 14°30′34″E	01576	Porta Reale Curtain	Upload Photo
St James Bastion	Triq il-Papa Piju V	35°53′42″N 14°30′35″E	01577	St James Bastion	Upload Photo
Castille Curtain	Misraħ Kastilja / Triq Ġirolamo Cassar	35°53′43″N 14°30′39″E	01578	Castille Curtain	Upload Photo
St Peter and St Paul Bastion	Upper Barrakka	35°53′41″N 14°30′43″E	01579	St Peter and St Paul Bastion	Upload Photo
St John Curtain	Triq il-Mitħna	35°53′53″N 14°30′29″E	01580	St John Curtain	Upload Photo
St Michael Bastion	Triq il-Mitħna, Hastings Gardens	35°53′56″N 14°30′26″E	01581	St Michael Bastion	Upload Photo
St Andrew Bastion	Triq l-Assedju l-Kbir	35°54′00″N 14°30′30″E	01582	St Andrew Bastion	Upload Photo
Retired Battery beneath Spencer Bastion	Triq Sant'Andrija	35°53′58″N 14°30′30″E	01583	Retired Battery beneath Spencer Bastion	Upload Photo
Manderaggio Curtain	Triq Marsamxett / Misraħ Mattia Preti	35°52′54″N 14°24′04″E	01584	Manderaggio Curtain	Upload Photo
San Salvatore Bastion	Triq Marsamxett	35°54′02″N 14°30′39″E	01585	San Salvatore Bastion	Upload Photo
German Curtain	Triq Marsamxett	35°54′05″N 14°30′43″E	01586	German Curtain	Upload Photo
St Sebastian Curtain	Triq Marsamxett	35°54′07″N 14°30′47″E	01587	St Sebastian Curtain	Upload Photo
English Curtain	Triq San Bastjan	35°54′06″N 14°30′52″E	01588	English Curtain	Upload Photo
French Curtain	Misraħ Sant'Iermu c/w Triq l-Għajn	35°54′06″N 14°30′58″E	01589	French Curtain	Upload Photo
St Lazarus Bastion	Triq il-Mediterran (opposite Triq it-Tramuntana)	35°54′00″N 14°31′08″E	01590	St Lazarus Bastion	Upload Photo
St Lazarus Curtain	Triq il-Mediterran	35°53′56″N 14°31′06″E	01591	St Lazarus Curtain	Upload Photo
St Christopher Bastion	Lower Barrakka Gardens	35°53′51″N 14°31′04″E	01592	St Christopher Bastion	Upload Photo
St Lucy Curtain	Triq il-Lvant	35°53′50″N 14°30′59″E	01593	St Lucy Curtain	Upload Photo
St Barbara Bastion	Is-Sur ta'Santa Barbara	35°53′47″N 14°30′53″E	01594	St Barbara Bastion	Upload Photo
Marina Curtain	Triq il-Ġnien is-Sultan	35°53′44″N 14°30′47″E	01595	Marina Curtain	Upload Photo
St Gregory Bastion	Carafa Enceinte, Lower Saint Elmo	35°54′10″N 14°31′01″E	01596	St Gregory Bastion	Upload Photo
St Gregory Curtain	Carafa Enceinte, Lower Saint Elmo	35°54′11″N 14°31′05″E	01597	St Gregory Curtain	Upload Photo
Conception Bastion	Carafa Enceinte, Lower Saint Elmo	35°54′12″N 14°31′07″E	01598	Conception Bastion	Upload Photo
Sta Scholastica Curtain	Carafa Enceinte, Lower Saint Elmo	35°54′11″N 14°31′10″E	01599	Sta Scholastica Curtain	Upload Photo
St John Bastion Caraffa	Carafa Enceinte, Lower Saint Elmo	35°54′10″N 14°31′12″E	01600	St John Bastion Caraffa	Upload Photo
Sta Ubaldesca Curtain	Carafa Enceinte, Lower Saint Elmo	35°54′05″N 14°31′09″E	01601	Sta Ubaldesca Curtain	Upload Photo
St Michael Counterguard	Main Ditch c/w Triq l-Assedju l-Kbir	35°53′55″N 14°30′23″E	01602	St Michael Counterguard	Upload Photo
St John Counterguard	Foss ta' San Ġwann	35°53′48″N 14°30′26″E	01603	St John Counterguard	Upload Photo
St James Counterguard	Vjal Nelson c/w Triq Ġirolamo Cassar	35°53′40″N 14°30′33″E	01604	St James Counterguard	Upload Photo
St Peter and St Paul Counterguard	Ganado Gardens, opposite Barrakka Lift	35°53′39″N 14°30′42″E	01605	St Peter and St Paul Counterguard	Upload Photo
Main Ditch	from Triq l-Assedju l-Kbir to Xatt Lascaris	35°53′46″N 14°30′31″E	01606	Main Ditch	Upload Photo
Advanced Ditch	Foss ta'San Ġwann	35°53′46″N 14°30′26″E	01607	Advanced Ditch	Upload Photo
Rock-hewn Glacis	Foss ta' San Ġwann	35°53′52″N 14°30′26″E	01608	Rock-hewn Glacis	Upload Photo
Covertway of the main ditch	Main ditch; Triq Ġirolamo Cassar	35°53′52″N 14°30′27″E	01609	Covertway of the main ditch	Upload Photo
Covertway of the advanced ditch	Advanced ditch; Triq Ġirolamo Cassar	35°53′51″N 14°30′24″E	01610	Covertway of the advanced ditch	Upload Photo
Communication gallery of the counterscarps	Main ditch	35°53′52″N 14°30′27″E	01611	Communication gallery of the counterscarps	Upload Photo
St Andrew Tenaille	Triq l-Assedju l-Kbir	35°53′58″N 14°30′26″E	01612	St Andrew Tenaille	Upload Photo
Vendôme Bastion	Triq l-Ixpruna	35°54′08″N 14°31′03″E	01613	Vendôme Bastion	Upload Photo
Lascaris Battery	Xatt Lascaris	35°53′40″N 14°30′47″E	01614	Lascaris Battery	Upload Photo
Faussebraye beneath St Andrew Bastion	Triq l-Assedju l-Kbir	35°54′02″N 14°30′30″E	01615	Faussebraye beneath St Andrew Bastion	Upload Photo
Grunenburg low battery	Xatt il-Barriera	35°53′50″N 14°31′06″E	01616	Grunenburg low battery	Upload Photo
Fort St Elmo	Fort St. Elmo	35°54′07″N 14°31′08″E	01686	Fort St Elmo	Upload Photo
Left Demi-Bastion	Fort St. Elmo	35°54′05″N 14°31′07″E	01687	Left Demi-Bastion	Upload Photo
Right Demi-Bastion	Fort St. Elmo	35°54′06″N 14°31′05″E	01688	Right Demi-Bastion	Upload Photo
Left arm	Fort St. Elmo	35°54′07″N 14°31′09″E	01689	Left arm	Upload Photo
Right arm	Fort St. Elmo	35°54′08″N 14°31′06″E	01690	Right arm	Upload Photo
Left wing	Fort St. Elmo	35°54′08″N 14°31′09″E	01691	Left wing	Upload Photo
Right Wing	Fort St. Elmo	35°54′09″N 14°31′07″E	01692	Right Wing	Upload Photo
Cavalier	Fort St. Elmo	35°54′09″N 14°31′08″E	01693	Cavalier	Upload Photo
Piazza / parade ground	Fort St. Elmo	35°54′07″N 14°31′08″E	01694	Piazza / parade ground	Upload Photo
Short curtain / rampart with Main Gate	Fort St. Elmo	35°54′06″N 14°31′07″E	01695	Short curtain / rampart with Main Gate	Upload Photo
Porta del Soccorso	Fort St. Elmo	35°54′06″N 14°31′08″E	01696	Porta del Soccorso	Upload Photo
Land front Ditch	Fort St. Elmo	35°54′05″N 14°31′05″E	01697	Land front Ditch	Upload Photo
Glacis / granaries	Fort St. Elmo	35°54′04″N 14°31′06″E	01698	Glacis / granaries	Upload Photo
Gatehouse	Fort St. Elmo	35°54′06″N 14°31′07″E	01699	Gatehouse	Upload Photo
Main Gate and bridge on land front	Fort St. Elmo	35°54′05″N 14°31′07″E	01700	Main Gate and bridge on land front	Upload Photo
Boundary wall along counterscarp	Fort St. Elmo	35°54′05″N 14°31′05″E	01701	Boundary wall along counterscarp	Upload Photo
Barracks	Fort St. Elmo (Piazza)	35°54′07″N 14°31′06″E	01702	Barracks	Upload Photo
