= Martino Longhi =

Martino Longhi is the name of two related architects in Rome:

- Martino Longhi the Elder (1534-1591)
- Martino Longhi the Younger (1602-1660), son of Onorio Longhi (1568-1619) and grandson of Martino the elder
