= Romano Carapecchia =

Italian architect (1666–1738)

- Born: 1666; Rome, Papal States
- Died: 1738 (aged 71–72); Hospitaller Malta
- Education: Accademia di San Luca
- Occupation: Architect
- Style: Baroque
- Parents: Giovanni Antonio Carapecchia (father); Francesca Roveti (mother)

Romano Fortunato Carapecchia (1666–1738) was an Italian Baroque architect who was active in Rome, Malta and Sicily. His designs helped transform Malta's capital Valletta into a Baroque city in the first few decades of the 18th century.

== Biography ==
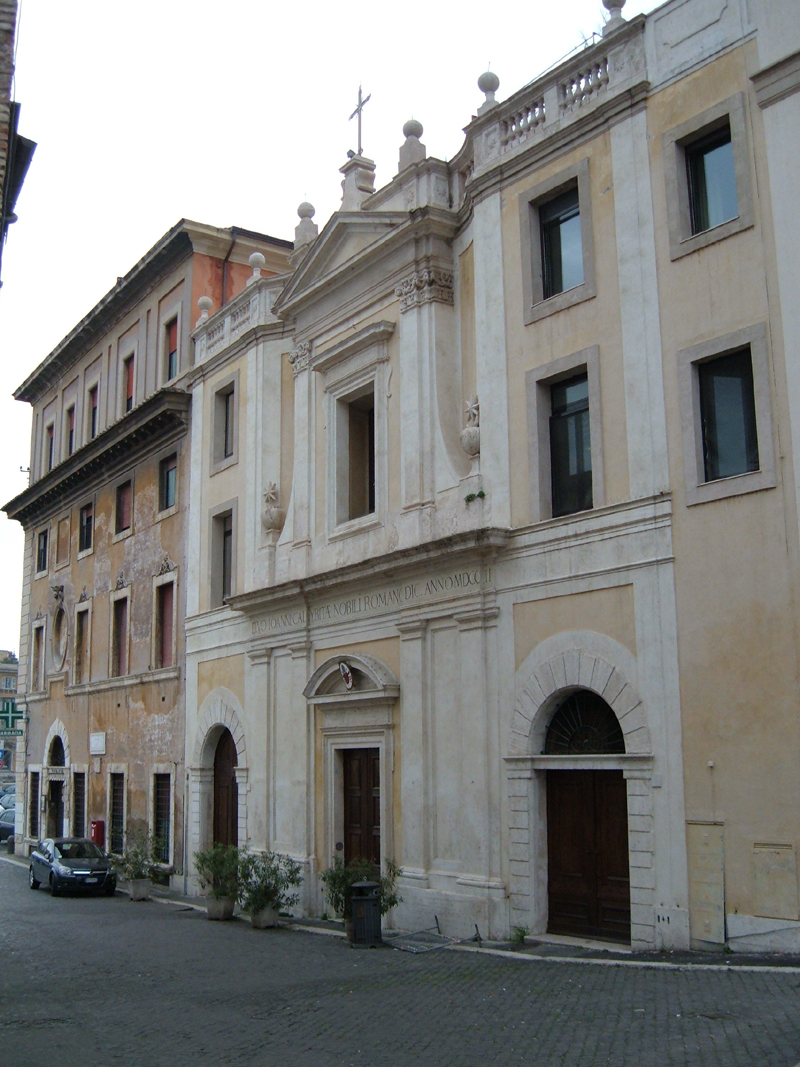
Church of San Giovanni Calibita, one of Carapecchia's early works in Rome

Carapecchia was born to Giovanni Antonio Carapecchia and Francesca Roveti in the parish of Sant'Eustachio, Rome in 1666. He studied at the Accademia di San Luca, where he won first prize for designing a palace in the seconda classe in 1681. Between around 1681 and 1691, he also worked within the studio of Carlo Fontana. In 1689, he wrote a treatise about theatre design entitled Pratica delle Machine de' Teatri. He also kept a record of his education in a document entitled Compendio Architettonico inventato da Romano Carapecchia. His career as an architect began in Rome, where he is credited with designing several buildings. He also designed urban schemes and fountains, and he produced a catafalque for Pope Alexander VIII in collaboration with Mattia de Rossi.

On 27 November 1706, Pope Clement XI sent a breve pontificio to Grand Master Ramón Perellós in which he praised the work of Carapecchia. In 1707 the latter left Rome and he settled in Valletta, the capital of Hospitaller Malta which was ruled by Perellós. He acquired the Grand Master's favour and he spent the rest of his career in Malta, where he played a role in transforming Valletta into a Baroque city through the design of numerous churches, palaces and other buildings. In 1708 and 1723, Carapecchia made studies about the water supply of the cities around Malta's Grand Harbour. He also worked under Perellós' successors, most notably António Manoel de Vilhena, for whom he designed a catafalque in 1726. Carapecchia also designed furniture in some of his projects, such as cupboards within the sacristy of Valletta's Church of St Paul. While based in Malta, he was also involved in some projects in nearby Sicily.

Carapecchia died in Malta in 1738.

== Works ==
Architectural works designed by or attributed to Carapecchia include:

Rome

- Church of San Giovanni Calibita (c. 1700)
- Palazzina Vaini (c. 1700)
- Teatro Tordinona

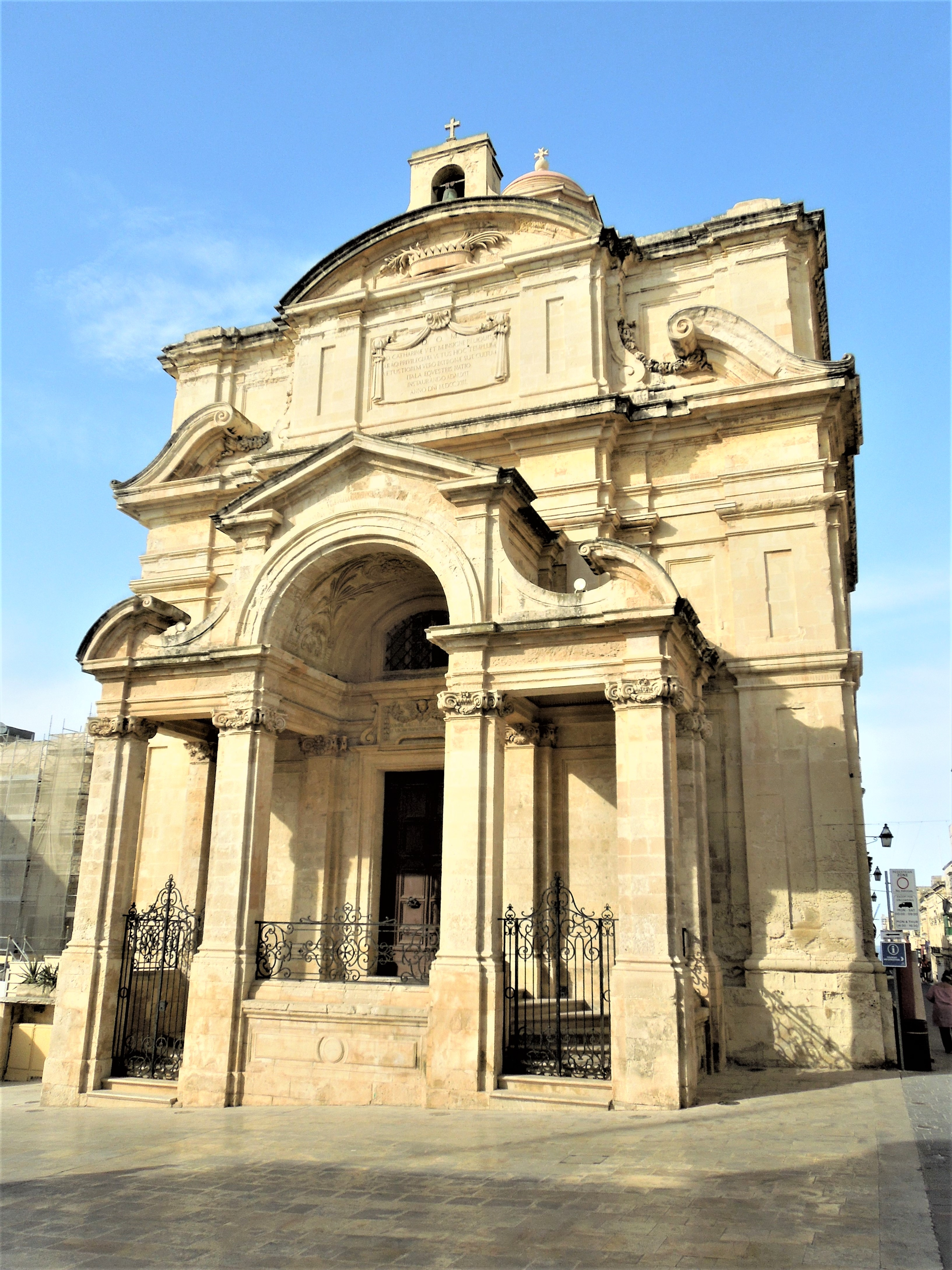
Church of St Catherine of Italy in Valletta

Valletta

- Barriera Stores and Perellós fountain at the Valletta marina (1707/1713) – stores partially demolished and fountain relocated to the Grandmaster's Palace in the 1850s
- Church of St James (1710)
- Church of St Catherine of Italy (1713)
- Church of St Catherine (1714)
- Church of Our Lady of Pilar (1718)
- Sacristy of the Church of St Paul (1718)
- Banca Giuratale (1721)
- Chapelle Ardente at the Conventual Church of St John (1726)
- Alterations to Del Monte Gate – demolished 1884
- Church of St Barbara
- Façade of Palazzo Spinola
- Annexes of the Conventual Church of St John
- Door of the Armoury at the Grandmaster's Palace
- Manoel Theatre

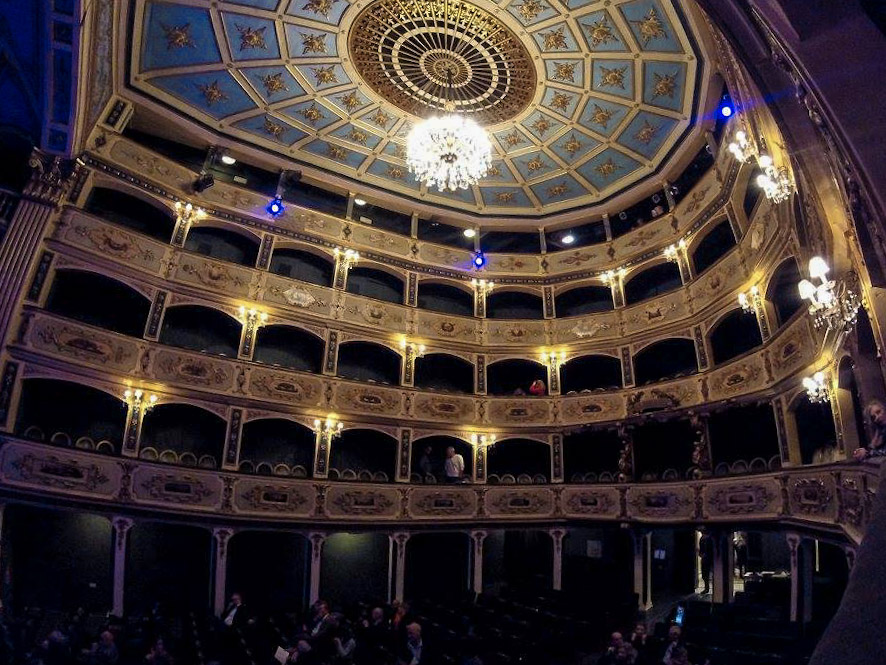
Manoel Theatre in Valletta

Elsewhere in Malta

- Palazzo Spinola, St Julian's (1733)
- Church of St Publius, Floriana (1730s)
- Main staircase of the Inquisitor's Palace, Birgu (1733–1734)
- Remodelling and completion of Notre Dame Gate, Cottonera Lines
- Main Gate of Fort Manoel (in collaboration with Charles François de Mondion)

Sicily

- Competition entry for the reconstruction of the Catania Cathedral (1709)
- Restoration of a Hospitaller complex in Marsala (1715)

== Legacy ==
An album of architectural drawings by Carapecchia still exists at the Courtauld Institute of Art in London. A book has been published about him by the Maltese historian Denis De Lucca.
