= Sant'Ambrogio e Carlo al Corso =

Roman Catholic basilica, a landmark of Rome, Italy

Church of Saints Ambrose and Charles Borromeo
- Chiesa di Sant'Ambrogio e Carlo al Corso (Italian); SS. Ambrosii et Caroli ad viam latam (Latin)
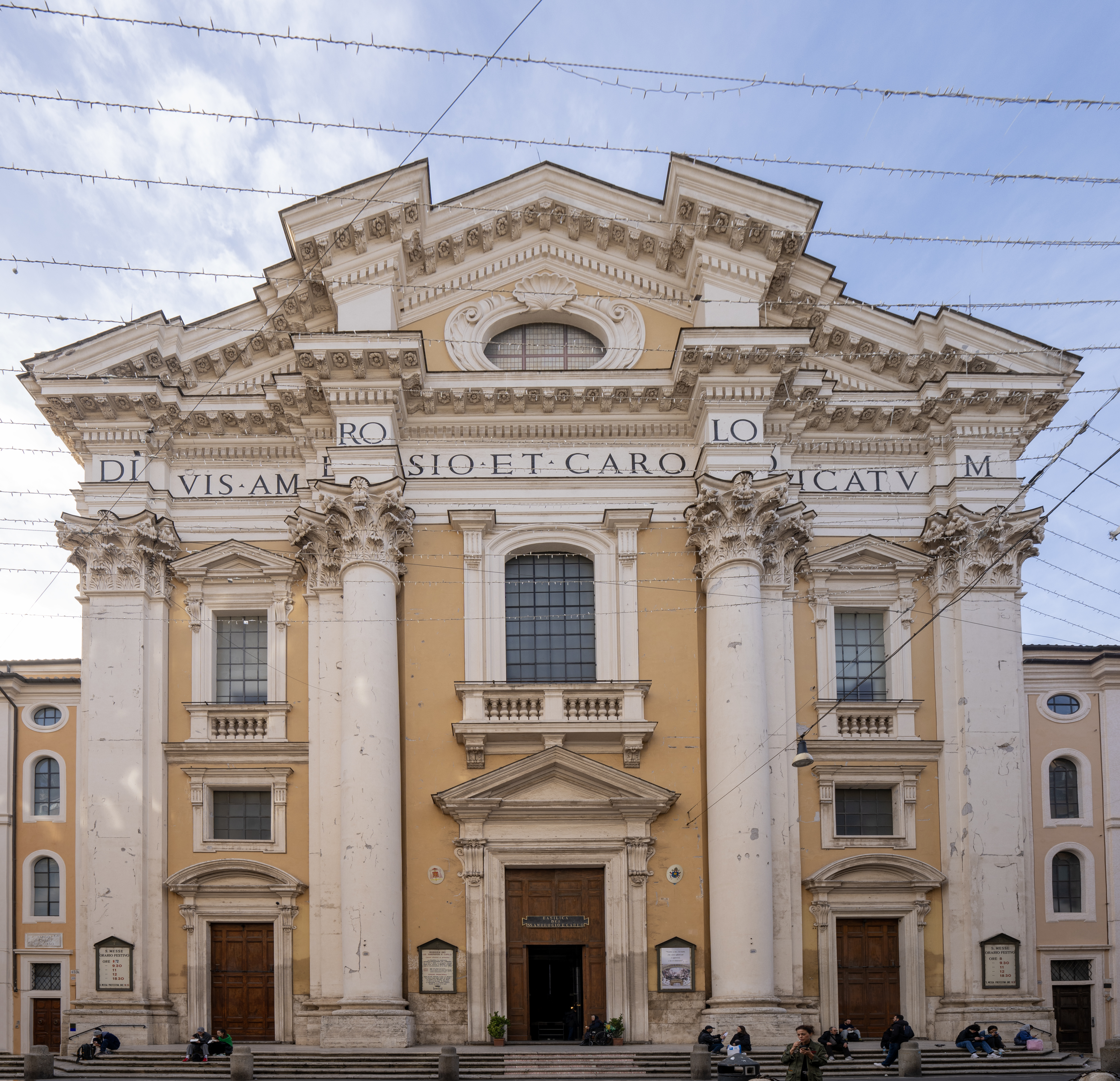
- The façade of San Carlo al Corso.
- Click on the map for a fullscreen view
- 41°54′19″N 12°28′40″E
- Location: Via del Corso 437, Rome
- Country: Italy
- Denomination: Catholic
- Religious institute: Rosminians

History
- Status: Titular church minor basilica parish church regional church Norwegian national church
- Dedication: Ambrose and Charles Borromeo

Administration
- Province: Diocese of Rome

Sant'Ambrogio e Carlo al Corso (usually known simply as San Carlo al Corso) is a basilica church in Rome, Italy, facing onto the central part of the Via del Corso. The apse of the church faces across the street, the Mausoleum of Augustus on Via di Ripetta.

This church is dedicated to Saint Ambrose and Saint Charles Borromeo, the patron saints of Milan. It is one of at least three churches in Rome dedicated to Borromeo, others including San Carlo ai Catinari and San Carlo alle Quattro Fontane.

== Construction ==
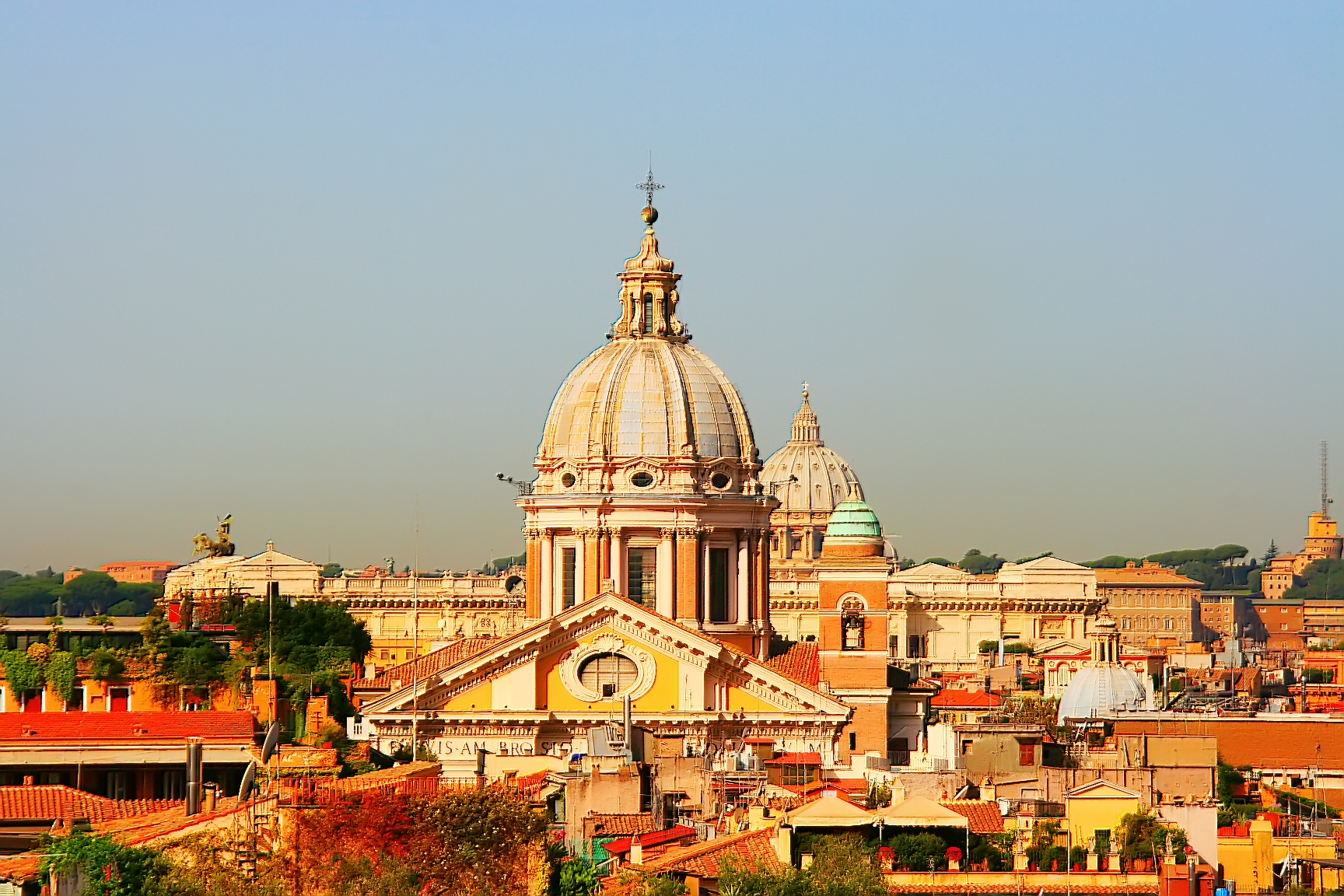
San Carlo al Corso view from top of Spanish Steps

The church of the Saints Ambrogio and Carlo al Corso is the national church of the Lombards, to whom in 1471 Pope Sixtus IV gave, in recognition of their valuable construction work of the Sistine Chapel, the small church of S. Niccolò del Tufo, which was first restored and then dedicated to S. Ambrogio, the patron saint of Milan.

Its construction was begun in honour of the canonization of St. Charles Borromeo in 1610, under the direction of Onorio Longhi and, after his death, of his son Martino Longhi the Younger. The site was that of the former church of San Nicola de Tofo. The ground plan is based on the Latin cross. The dome, resembling that of Santi Luca e Martina, was designed by Pietro da Cortona (1668), who was also responsible for the apse and rich internal decorations. The façade was designed by Cardinal Luigi Alessandro Omodei, who financed the completion of the church, and did not like the project prepared by Carlo Rainaldi.

Since 1906, the maintenance of the basilica has been entrusted to the priests of the Institute of Charity.

== Decoration ==
The central vault is frescoed with a Fall of the Rebel Angels (1677–1679) by Giacinto Brandi. The altarpiece, depicting the Saints Ambrose and Charles Borromeo with the Virgin and Jesus, was painted around 1685–1690 by Carlo Maratta. The stucco decoration was by Giacomo and Cosimo Fancelli. The statue of the saints was by Francesco Cavallini. Frescos of Justice and Peace were painted by Girolamo Troppa. There are also paintings by the baroque painter Giovanni Battista Beinaschi.

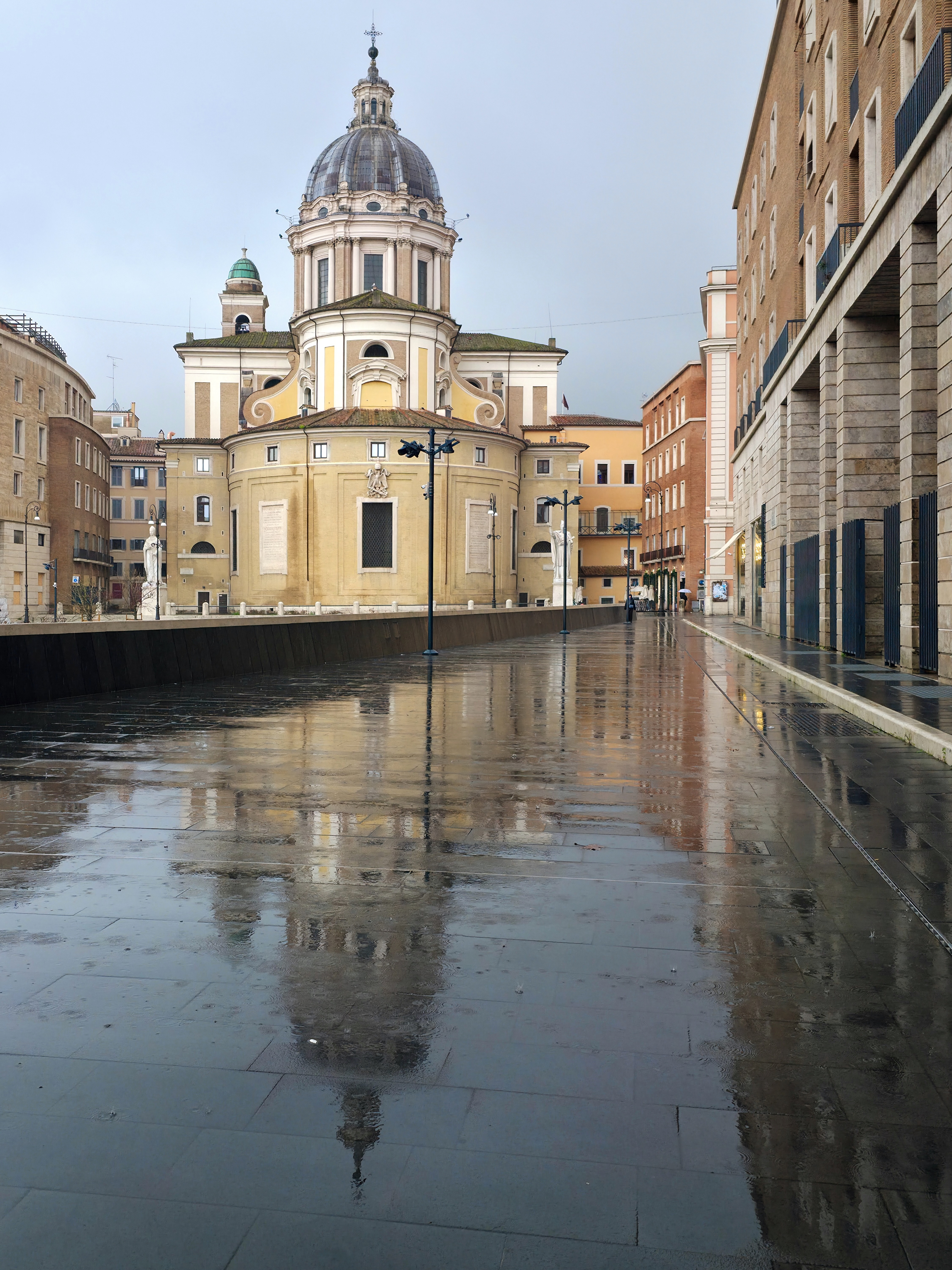
Rear of the church

San Carlo is the only church in Rome to have an ambulatory which contains the heart of Charles Borromeo, who was canonised on 1 November 1610 by Pope Paul V. It was donated to the church in 1614 by his cousin, Federico Borromeo.

The 16th-century oratory of St. Ambrose is beyond the left transept. The first chapel on the right is dedicated to the Crucifixion and has a fresco of Vigilance by Paolo Albertoni. The second chapel, on the right, is dedicated to Mary, Aid of Christians (Maria Auxilium Christianorum), and has an image of the Virgin donated by St Vincent Pallotti in the 19th century. The third chapel on the right is dedicated to the Holy Family. On its left side is a depiction of The Redemptor and Sts Ambrose and Charles as well as the sepulchral monument of Federico Borromeo.

In the chapel of the left nave dedicated to Saint Philip Neri, two paintings by Jacopo Zoboli are preserved: Saint Aloysius Gonzaga among the plague victims (on the right) and The Communion of Saint Stanislaus Kostka (on the left), both from 1726;

On the exterior, to the sides of the apse and facing the ancient Mausoleum of Augustus, are two giant statues of the titular saints, among the largest in Rome.

Other artists active in the church include Pasquale de' Rossi, Luigi Garzi, Francesco Rosa, Giovanni Battista Buonocore, and Fabbrizio Chiari.

== Chapel of St. Olav ==
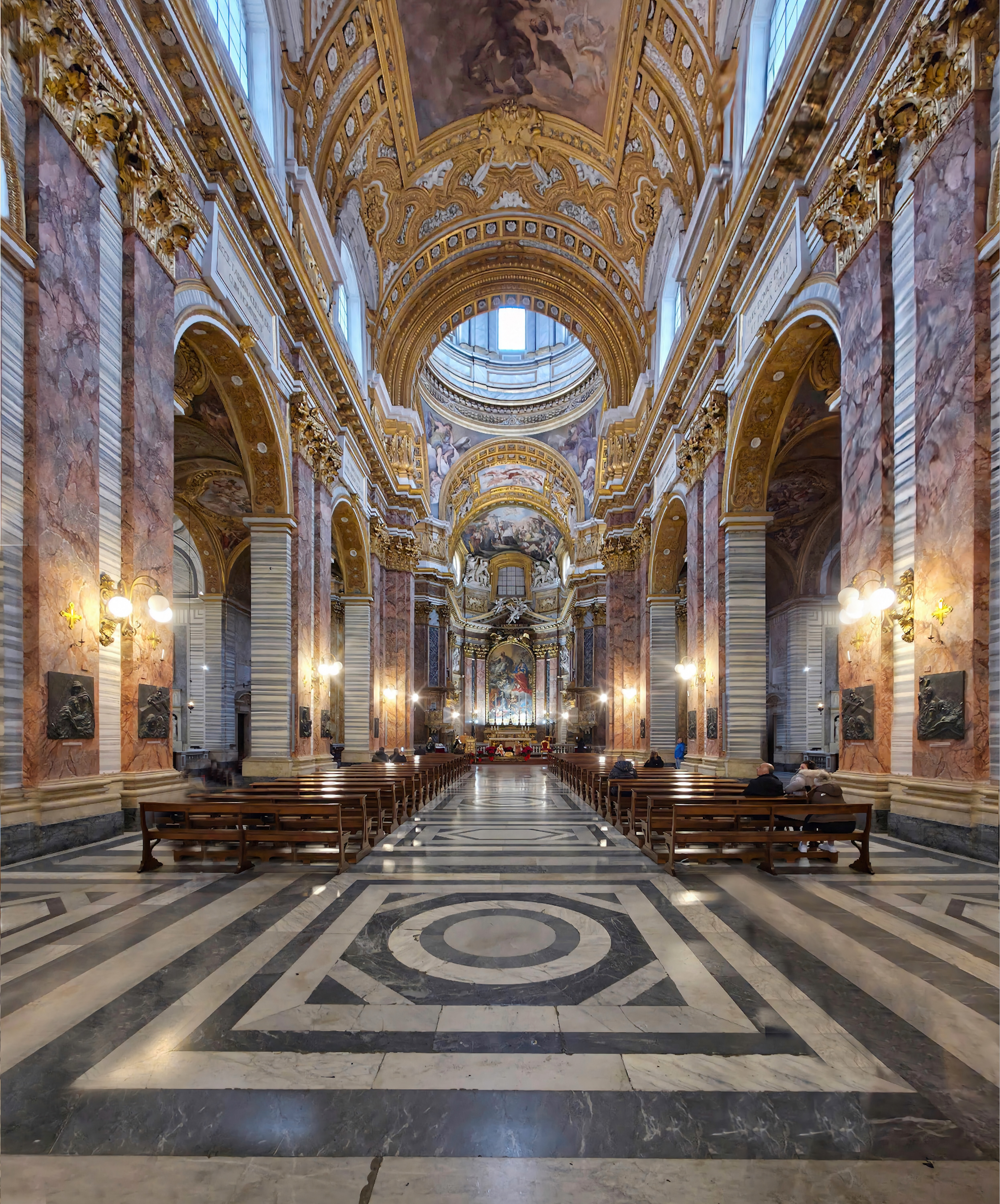
Interior

The Chapel of St. Olav of Norway, to the left of the nave, is dedicated to the martyr king who converted to Christianity and was slain in the Battle of Stiklestad in 1030. The chapel was inaugurated by Cardinal Lucido Maria Parocchi on 9 April 1893, on the 50th anniversary of the first Mass celebrated legally in Norway since the Reformation.

The painting, by the Polish artist Pius Weloński, depicts the Viking king's victory over his own pagan past, which is represented by a dragon. It was a gift, presented on 3 March 1893, to Pope Leo XIII for the 50th anniversary of his episcopal ordination. Bishop Johannes Olav Fallize, then the Vicar Apostolic of Norway, had asked that it be placed in this chapel and it was unveiled by the Papal chamberlain, Baron Wilhelm Wedel-Jarlsberg. The Pope supported the idea of a Norwegian chapel in Rome.

A smaller picture on the altar shows St. Anne and her daughter, the Blessed Virgin. St Anne was a very popular saint in pre-Reformation Norway.

The relics of a Roman martyr, St. Saturninus, are interred in the altar. Nothing is known about him except his name.

The chapel was restored, and it was reinaugurated by John Willem Gran, the Bishop of Oslo, in 1980. The initiative for this restoration came from Cecilie "Ciss" Riber-Mohn (who was not herself a Catholic, and who died in 1978, before the restoration was complete), Olga Térése "Olgese" Mowinckel Ringler and her Italian husband Andrea Ringler. Rieber-Mohn had also preserved the chapel in the 1960s when there was talk about using it for other purposes.

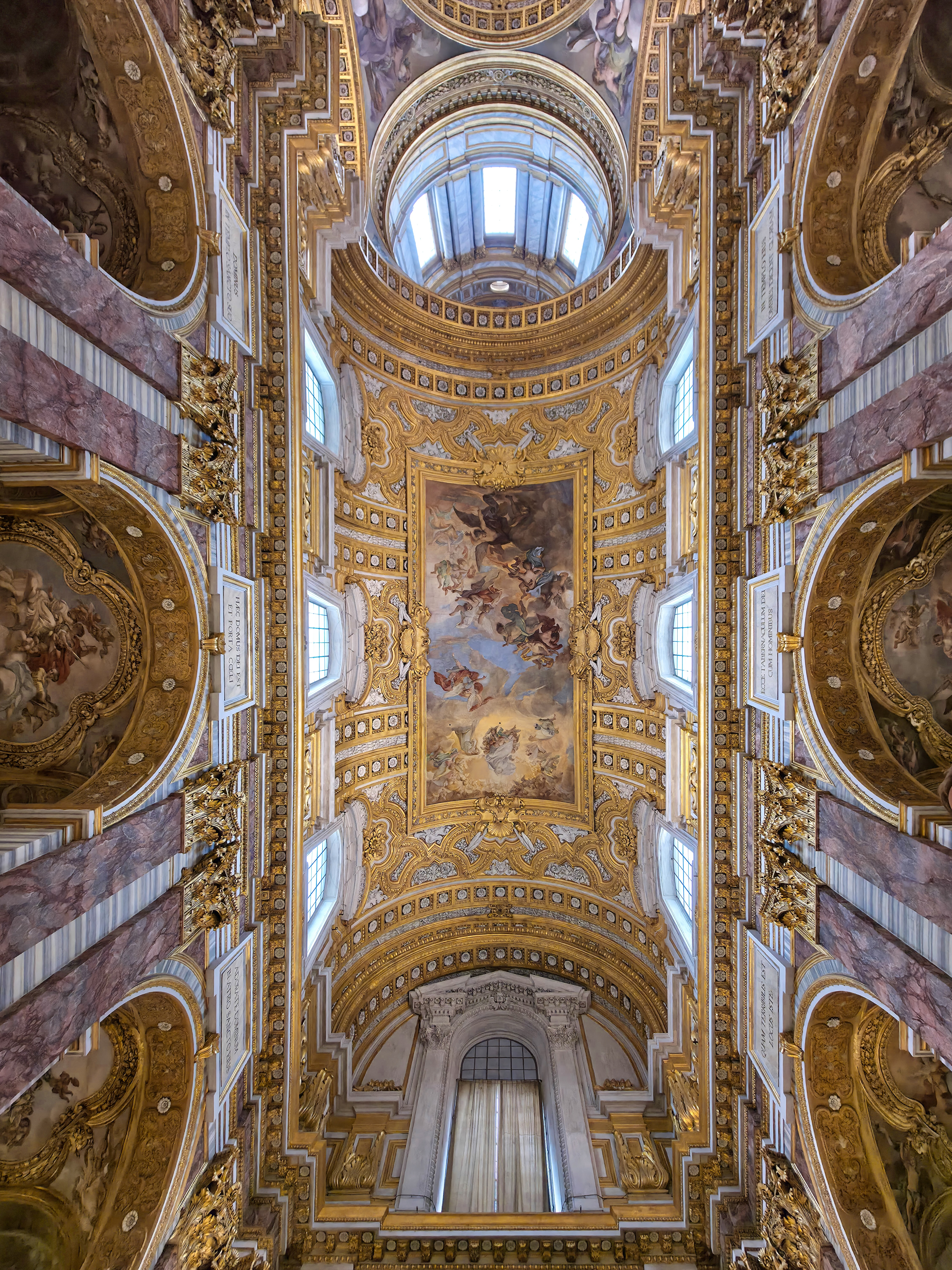

Mass is celebrated in Norwegian at Christmas, on 17 May (Constitution Day) and 16 October (feast of St. Olav's conversion), and many Norwegian expatriates, including non-Catholics, take part. Requiem masses are celebrated for Norwegians with connections to Rome. Norwegian pilgrim groups can make an appointment to celebrate Mass here, and at times tourist groups come here for ecumenical services.

== Marriage of Liszt ==
San Carlo al Corso is the church where the marriage was planned to be solemnized between Franz Liszt and Carolyne zu Sayn-Wittgenstein. From 1849, this Polish princess granted hospitality to Liszt, her great lover, at the Altenburg in Weimar. In 1860 she left for Rome to dissolve her marriage with the Russian officer Nikolaus - which had already been done in Russia five years earlier. When this succeeded in January 1861, she organized her union with Liszt on 22 October 1861, Liszt's 50th Birthday, in the San Carlo, her parish church. On 20 October Liszt arrived in Rome, and made a marriage statement with Carolyne. Meanwhile, Bishop Von Hohenlohe, a brother of Carolyne's son-in-law, succeeded, with help of Carolyne's relatives, in preventing the marriage ceremony - and thus in keeping Carolyne's capital in the families: on the eve of the marriage Carolyne received a message from the pastor of San Carlo that the request was being reconsidered and the wedding postponed. Thereupon she broke her relationship with Liszt off - who remained in Rome, where he studied theology, became friendly with Von Hohenlohe, received from him the Minor Orders, and proceeded life as ‘Abbé Liszt’.

== List of Cardinal-Priest ==
- Desiderio Scaglia, O.P., 16 October 1627 – 21 August 1639
- Angelo Dell'Acqua, O.SS.CA, 9 June 1967 – 27 August 1972
- Ugo Poletti, 5 March 1973 – 25 February 1997
- Dionigi Tettamanzi, 21 February 1998 – 5 August 2017

== See also ==
- San Carlo al Corso, Milan
- 17th-century Western domes
- Giacinto Brandi
- Carlo Maratta
- Jacopo Zoboli

== Sources ==
- Titi, Filippo (1763). Descrizione delle Pitture, Sculture e Architetture esposte in Roma. Marco Pagliarini, Rome. pp. 371–75. "Fillipo Titi."

Preceded by San Camillo de Lellis	Landmarks of Rome; San Carlo al Corso	Succeeded by Santa Cecilia in Trastevere
