= Paolo Albertoni =

Italian painter

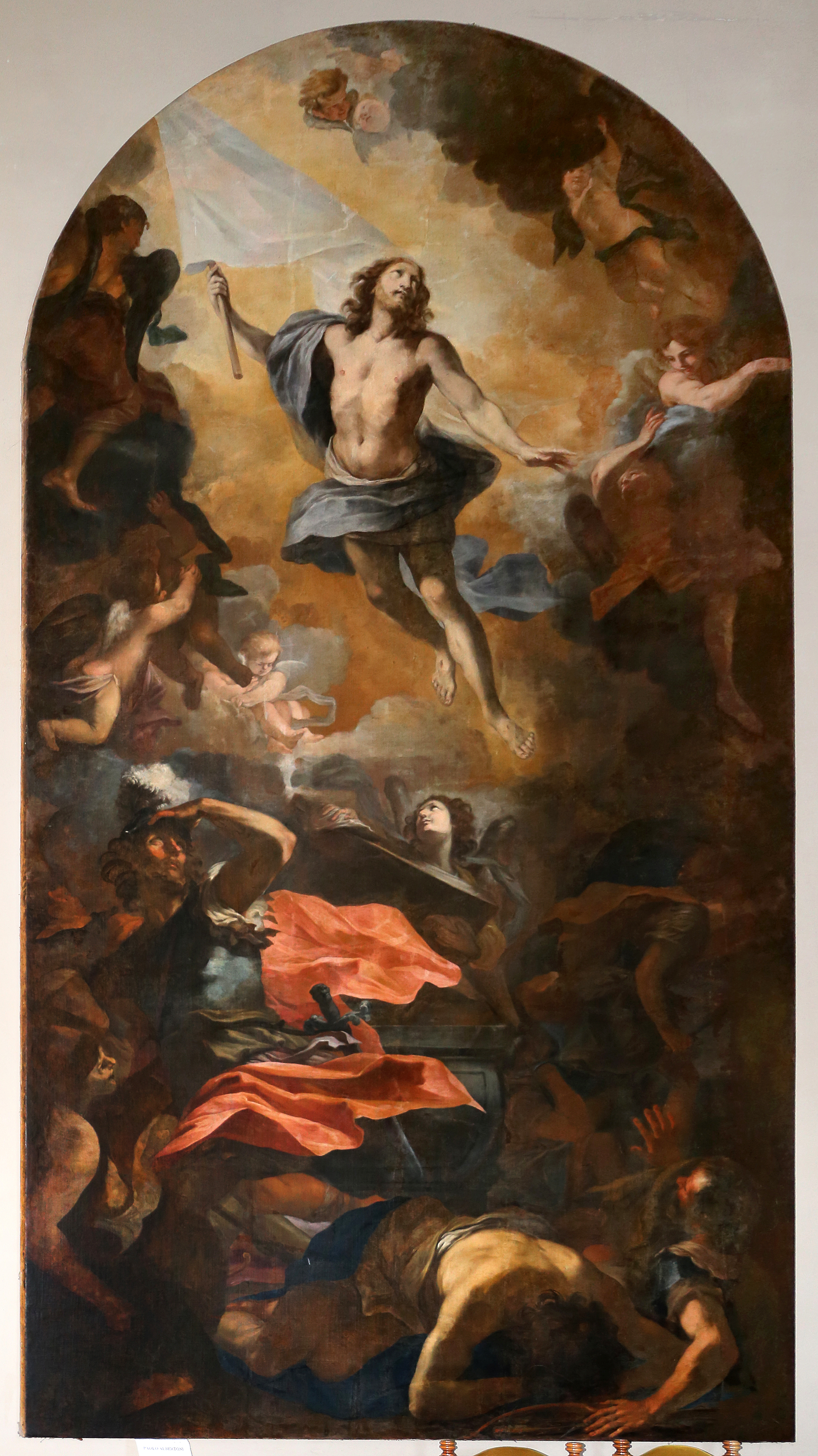
Resurrection

Paolo Albertoni was an Italian painter of the late-Baroque period. He was born in Rome and trained in the studio of Carlo Maratti. He joined the Accademia di San Luca in Rome in 1695, and died soon after. There are pictures by him in the church of San Carlo al Corso, in Santa Maria in the Campo Marzo, Santa Marta al Collegio Romano, and other churches in Rome. He frescoed for the chapel in the Palazzo Chigi in Formello .
