= Church of Saint Barbara, Valletta =

Church of St Barbara
- Kirche Sankt Barbara; Église Sainte-Barbara
- Knisja ta' Santa Barbara
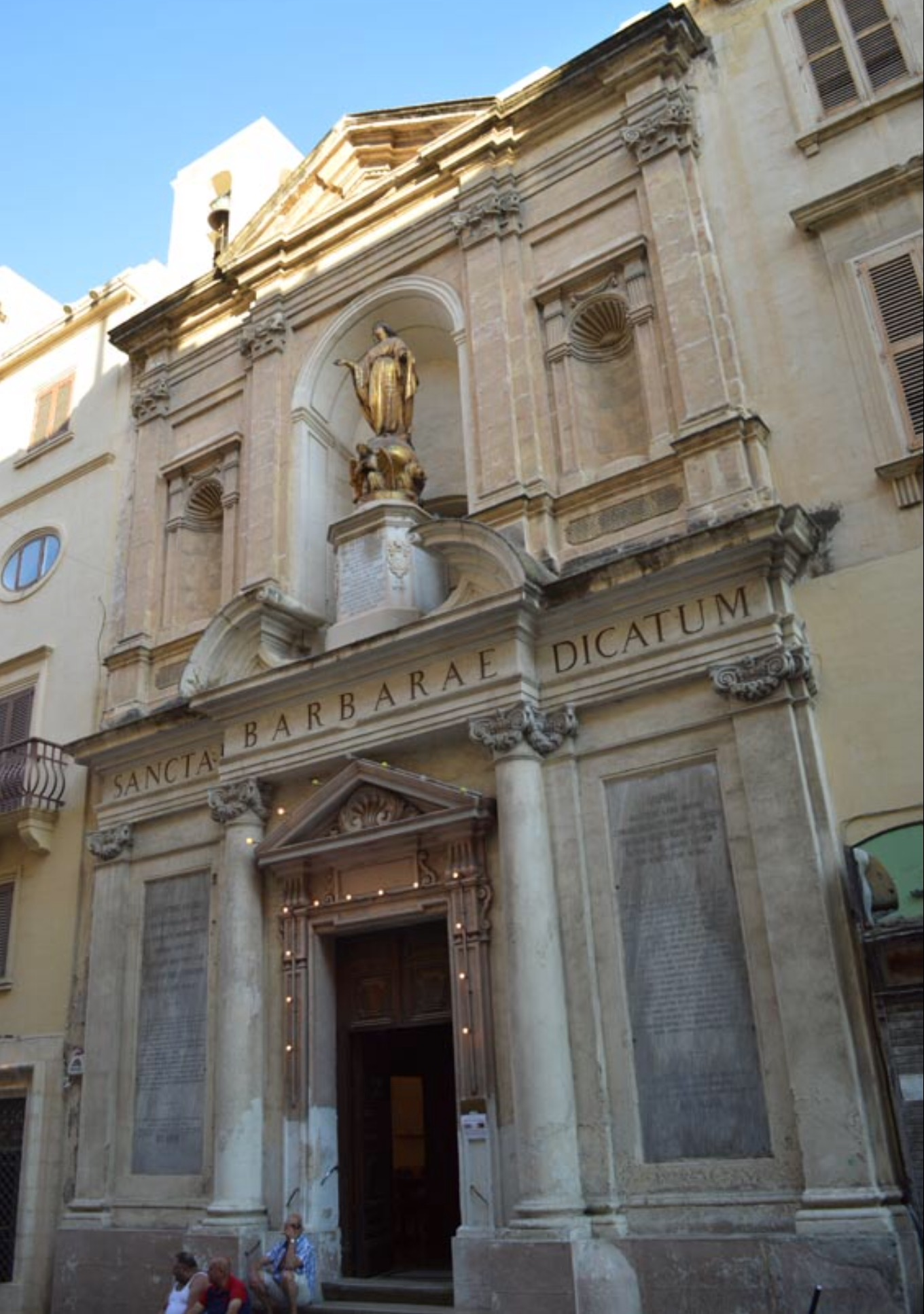
- View of the Church of Santa Barbara
- Church of St Barbara
- 35°53′49.2″N 14°30′38.7″E
- Location: Valletta, Malta
- Denomination: Roman Catholic

History
- Status: Active
- Founded: late 1500s
- Dedication: Saint Barbara

Architecture
- Functional status: Church
- Architect(s): Romano Carapecchia; Giuseppe Bonici
- Architectural type: Church
- Style: Baroque

Administration
- Archdiocese: Malta

Clergy
- Rector: Monsignor Paul Carmel Vella

The Church of St Barbara (Maltese: Knisja ta' Santa Barbara, German: Kirche Sankt Barbara, French: Église Sainte-Barbara) is a Roman Catholic church situated in Valletta, Malta.

== History ==
The original church was built in the late 16th century for the Confraternity of St Barbara, composed of bombardiers. It was completely rebuilt in 1740 with a design by the Italian architect Romano Carapecchia who died in 1738. The work was finished by architect Giuseppe Bonnici in accordance with Carapecchia’s design.

The 18th-century titular painting of the Church depicts the Apotheosis of St. Barbara by the renowned French artist Antoine de Favray.

The church also served the spiritual needs of the knights from the Langue of Provence. The most prominent benefactor was Fra Jacques de Quiqueran Beaujeu. Inside was also buried a relative of the same family originating from Arles: Fra Antoine Honore’ de Quiqueran Beaujeu.

Another important link to France lies in the fact that during the First World War, the church was also used by the French Community in Malta. The French fleet made use of Malta as a base during which time mass in French and catechism classes were held at Saint Barbara. The Church came under the direct patronage of the French Vice Admiral Paul Chocheprat and his wife, Maria. In 1916, as a sign of gratitude, a marble tablet was erected to commemorate this period

The church building is listed on the National Inventory of the Cultural Property of the Maltese Islands.

== Architecture ==
The church was built in the Baroque style. In the centre of the façade, just above the door, one can see a large gilded statue of the Immaculate Conception. It was placed there in 1904 to commemorate the jubilee of the Immaculate Conception. Internally, the church is centrally planned, having an oval dome typical of the baroque period, which is a very rare feature in local churches.

== Present day ==
In recent years, the church served as the parish church for the English, French and German-speaking communities. It is the only church in Malta that had services celebrated in the German and French languages. Also, a mass in Tagalog was celebrated every Sunday.

In the present, the Church is being fully restored by Fondazzjoni Wirt Artna, following an agreement with the Archdiocese of Malta in 2024.

== See also ==
- Culture of Malta
- History of Malta
- List of churches in Malta
- Religion in Malta
