= Church of St Catherine of Italy, Valletta =

Church of St Catherine of Alexandria
- Chiesa di Santa Caterina d'Italia
- Knisja ta' Santa Katerina ta' Lixandra
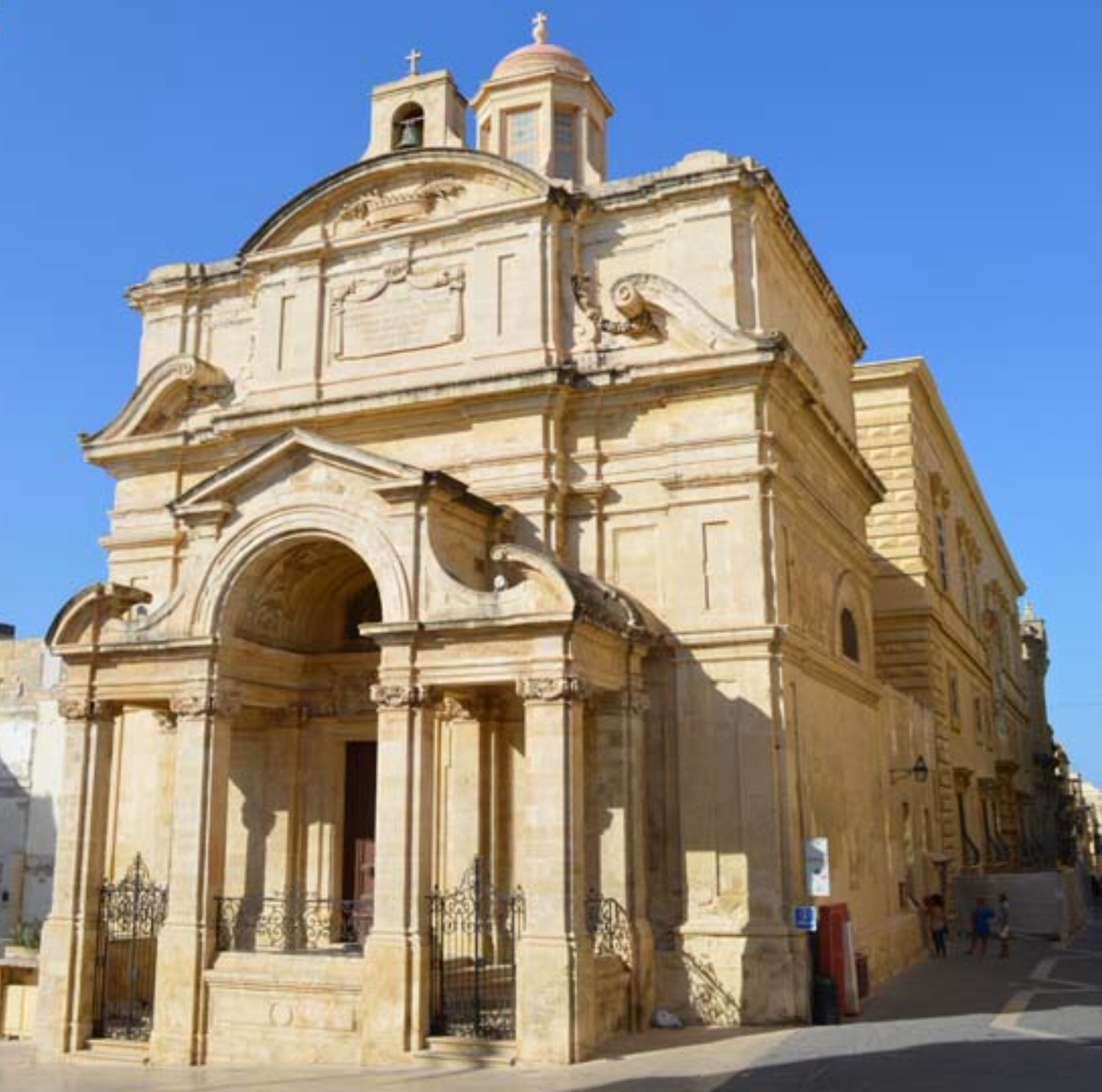
- Church of St Catherine of Alexandria
- 35°53′46.6″N 14°30′39.5″E
- Location: Valletta, Malta
- Denomination: Roman Catholic
- Website: chiesasantacaterinaditalia.org

History
- Status: Active
- Founded: 1576
- Dedication: St Catherine of Alexandria

Architecture
- Functional status: Church
- Architect: Romano Carapecchia
- Architectural type: Church
- Style: Baroque

Specifications
- Materials: Limestone

Administration
- Archdiocese: Malta
- Parish: Valletta (St Dominic)

Clergy
- Rector: Gino Gauci

The Church of St Catherine of Alexandria (Maltese: Knisja ta' Santa Katerina), commonly known as the Church of St Catherine of Italy (Maltese: Knisja ta' Santa Katerina tal-Italja, Italian: Chiesa di Santa Caterina d'Italia) is a Roman Catholic church in Valletta, Malta. It was built by the Hospitaller Langue of Italy and it serves as the parish church of the Italian community of Malta.

== Origins ==
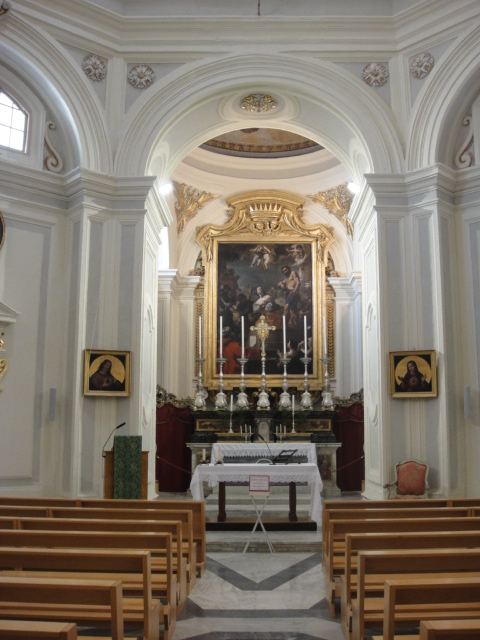
The interior of the church

The church was built in 1576 by the Italian knights of St John to serve as their church. It was built adjacent to the Auberge d'Italie. Girolamo Cassar was commissioned to draw up the plans. In the 17th century the church was enlarged. An octagonal church was added to the existing chapel. The original chapel was changed into the sanctuary of the church. The church underwent a major restoration from 2001 till 2011. Today the church still serves as the parish church of the Italian community of Malta.

The church building is listed on the National Inventory of the Cultural Property of the Maltese Islands.

== Works of Art ==
The titular painting was painted by Mattia Preti. It depicts the martyrdom of St Catherine of Alexandria. Preti donated the painting to the church after his arrival in Malta. The cupola of the church was also painted by Preti. He drew it with painted stucco decorations and ornamental patterns in grey and gold.

== See also ==
- Culture of Malta
- History of Malta – Maltese history
- List of Churches in Malta
- Religion in Malta
