= Onorio Longhi =

Italian architect (1568–1619)

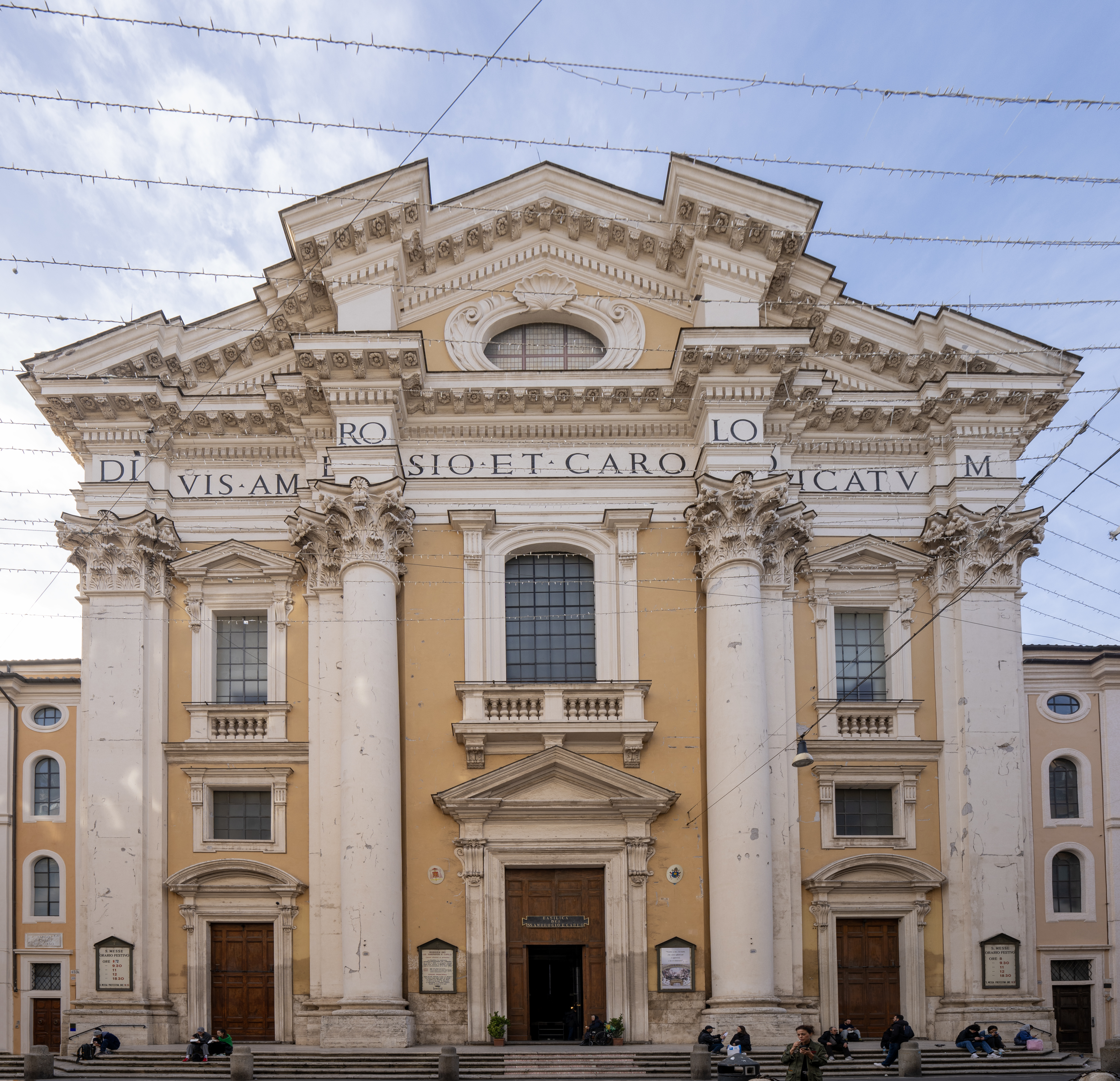
- San Carlo al Corso, designed by Longhi
- Born: 12 October 1568; Viggiù, Duchy of Milan
- Died: 31 December 1619 (aged 51); Rome, Papal States
- Occupation: Architect
- Movement: Baroque

Onorio Longhi (12 October 1568 – 31 December 1619) was an Italian architect, the father of Martino Longhi the Younger and the son of Martino Longhi the Elder.

== Life and works ==
Born in Viggiù, Lombardy, Longhi began as an assistant to his father, and inherited the latter's commission at his death in 1591. He is described by contemporary sources as a ruthless figure, a companion of Caravaggio, together with whom he was tried for homicide in Rome in 1606, and subsequently exiled.

Returning to Lombardy, he executed several unfinished plans for the Duomo of Milan and other churches, until a Papal amnesty allowed him to come back to Rome in 1611. Here he designed the first plan for the Milanese national church in Rome, San Carlo al Corso, which was completed by his son and by Pietro da Cortona. Other Longhi's works include the church of Santa Maria Liberatrice in the Roman Forum (later destroyed by the excavations which brought to light Santa Maria Antiqua) and the Santoro Chapel in the Archbasilica of Saint John Lateran. Longhi died in Rome on 31 December 1619, aged 51.

== Works ==
- Longhi, Onorio (1607). Discorso di Honorio Lunghi. Del Teuere, della sua inondazione, & de' suoi rimedij. In Milano: appresso Girolamo Bordoni.
