= Martino Longhi the Younger =

Italian architect

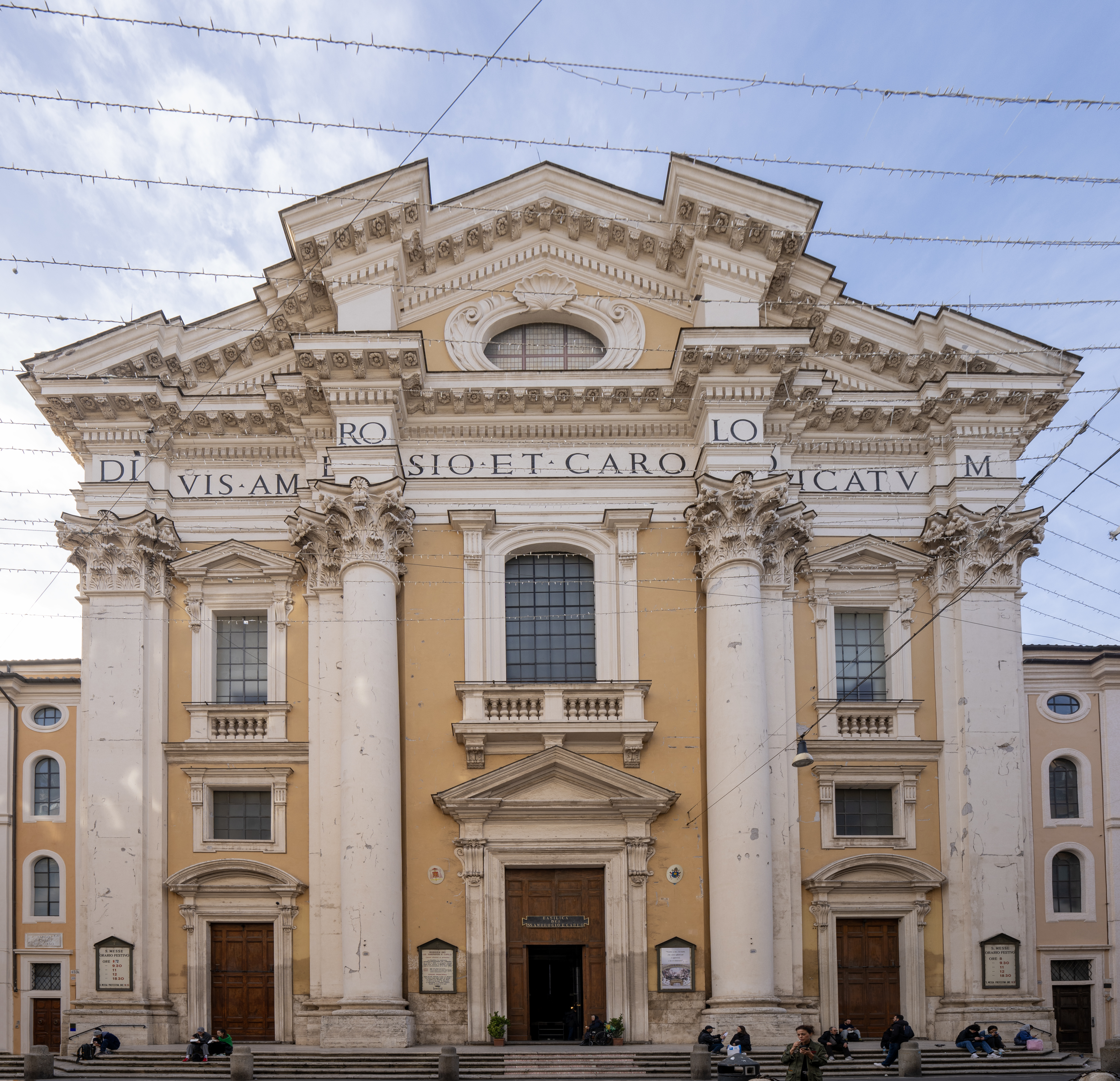
Sant'Ambrogio e Carlo al Corso.

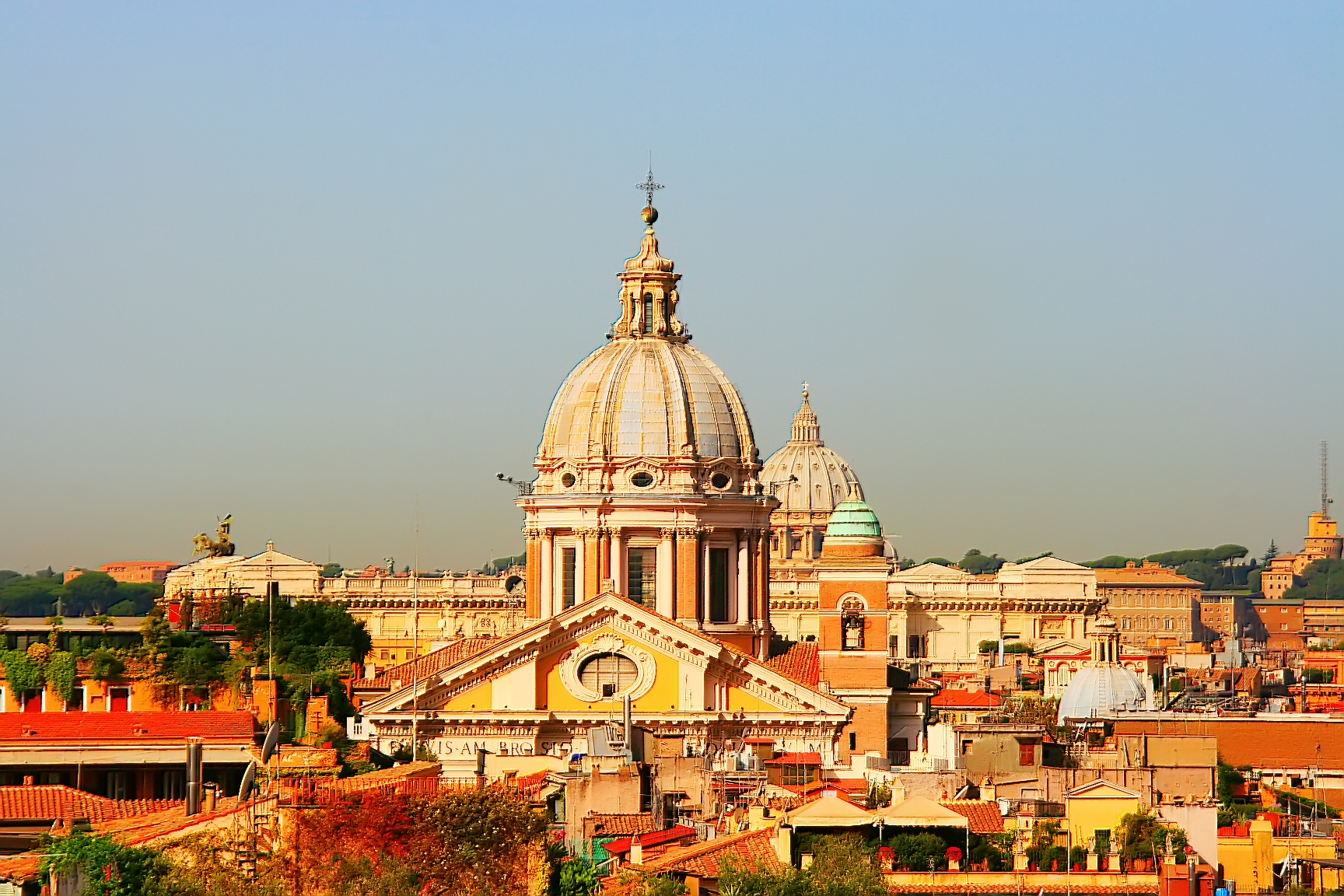
Sant'Ambrogio e Carlo al Corso view from the top of the Spanish Steps.

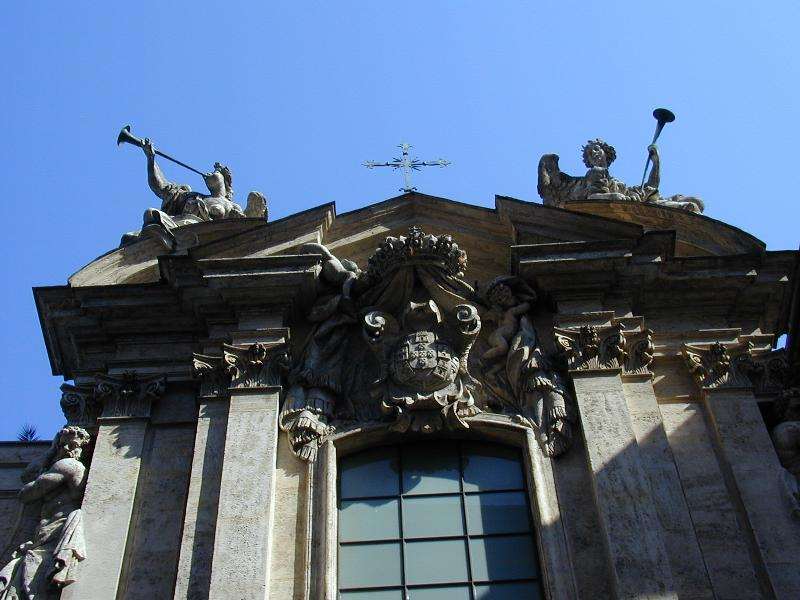
Detail of the façade of Sant'Antonio dei Portoghesi in Rome.

Martino Longhi the Younger (Italian: Martino Longhi il Giovane; 18 March 1602 – 15 December 1660) was an Italian architect of the Baroque period active in Rome, in a milieu when the most prominent competition for commissions came from no less than Gian Lorenzo Bernini, Francesco Borromini, Carlo Rainaldi and Pietro da Cortona.

He was born in Rome to a family of architects. His grandfather Martino Longhi the Elder had completed many buildings in Rome. His father Onorio Longhi was also a prominent architect, and Martino inherited the work at San Carlo al Corso upon the death of his father in 1619. The church itself may have been designed by his grandfather. By 1625, Martino publishes a treatise on architecture. By 1625, he is a member of the Accademia di San Luca. In the 1630s he also began working in the construction of Sant'Antonio dei Portoghesi. In 1644, he designed the façade for San Giovanni Calibita. In 1645, he began construction on the striking vertical façade of Santi Vincenzo e Anastasio a Trevi. In the 1650s, he worked on the reconstruction of the now destroyed Sant'Adriano.

Longhi had no children, and he is buried in Viggiù, in Lombardy, where he died. Like some of his contemporary competitors, Longhi seems to have suffered from a lack of sociability.
