= Church of St Mary Magdalene, Valletta =

Church of St Mary Magdalene
- Knisja ta' Santa Marija Madalena
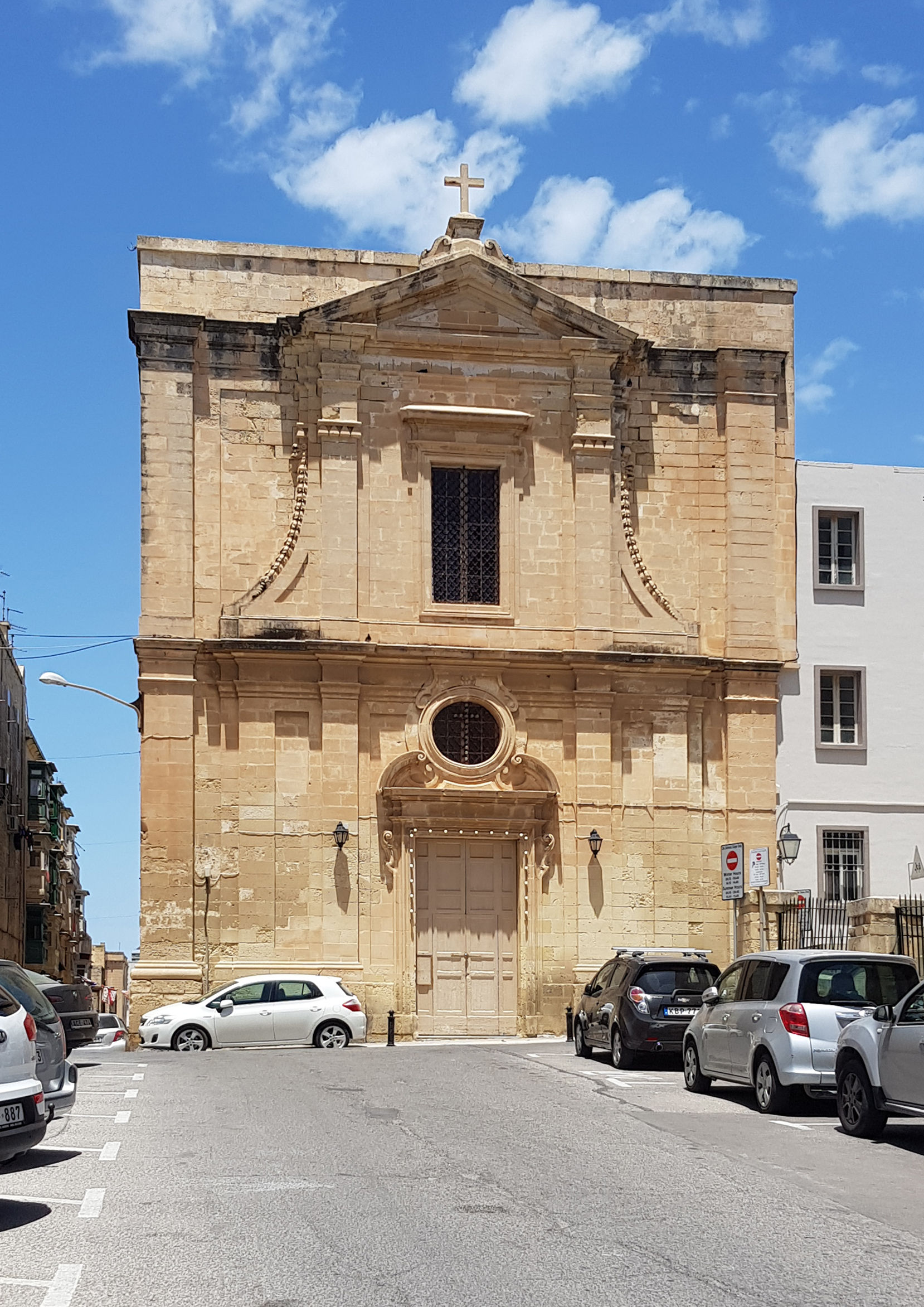
- The church's façade in 2020
- Church of St Mary Magdalene
- 35°54′01.0″N 14°31′03.2″E
- Location: Valletta, Malta
- Denomination: Roman Catholic

History
- Founded: 1595
- Dedication: St Mary Magdalene

Architecture
- Architectural type: Church
- Style: Baroque & Mannerism

Specifications
- Materials: Limestone

The Church of St Mary Magdalene is a Roman Catholic church building in Valletta, Malta. The church, named after Jesus' companion Mary Magdalene, was part of the Magdalene asylum situated adjacent to the church. The church was deconsecrated in the mid 20th century and was blessed again by Bishop Charles Scicluna on 25 February 2015.

== History ==
The church was built around the 1595 as the church of the Magdalene nuns whose convent they had adjacent to the church. While most Magdalene monasteries were not wealthy, Malta's Magdalene sisters were indeed. In 1602 Pope Clement VIII gave the house the rights to one fifth of the goods and estates of deceased prostitutes in Malta. This changed the financial status of the order; it soon became the richest monastery in Malta. The works of the Magdalene nuns ended in 1798 with the arrival of the French who took all the monastery's wealth and properties and disbanded its members. The nuns moved into St Catherine's monastery. The last Magdalene nun died in 1846. The church later served Roman Catholic soldiers stationed in Fort Saint Elmo as well as navy families from the Camerata barracks across the road. In 1941 the monastery was destroyed by air raids during World War II. A primary school was built instead. After this the church was abandoned. The altars of the church were moved to St Catherine's monastery. Later the church of St Mary Magdalene started to serve as a storage garage for carnival floats until 2006. In 2008 the church was cleared and partially restored.

The church building is listed on the National Inventory of the Cultural Property of the Maltese Islands.

== Architecture ==
The church is square and has a very pain exposed side only containing two windows. The façade is built in a Mannerist style with the central bay set within the square frame of the building. It has three bays on two levels. Inside the church has a baroque style.

== See also ==
- Culture of Malta
- History of Malta
- List of Churches in Malta
- Religion in Malta
