= Church of Our Lady of Pilar, Valletta =

Church of Our Lady of Pilar
- Knisja tal-Madonna tal-Pilar
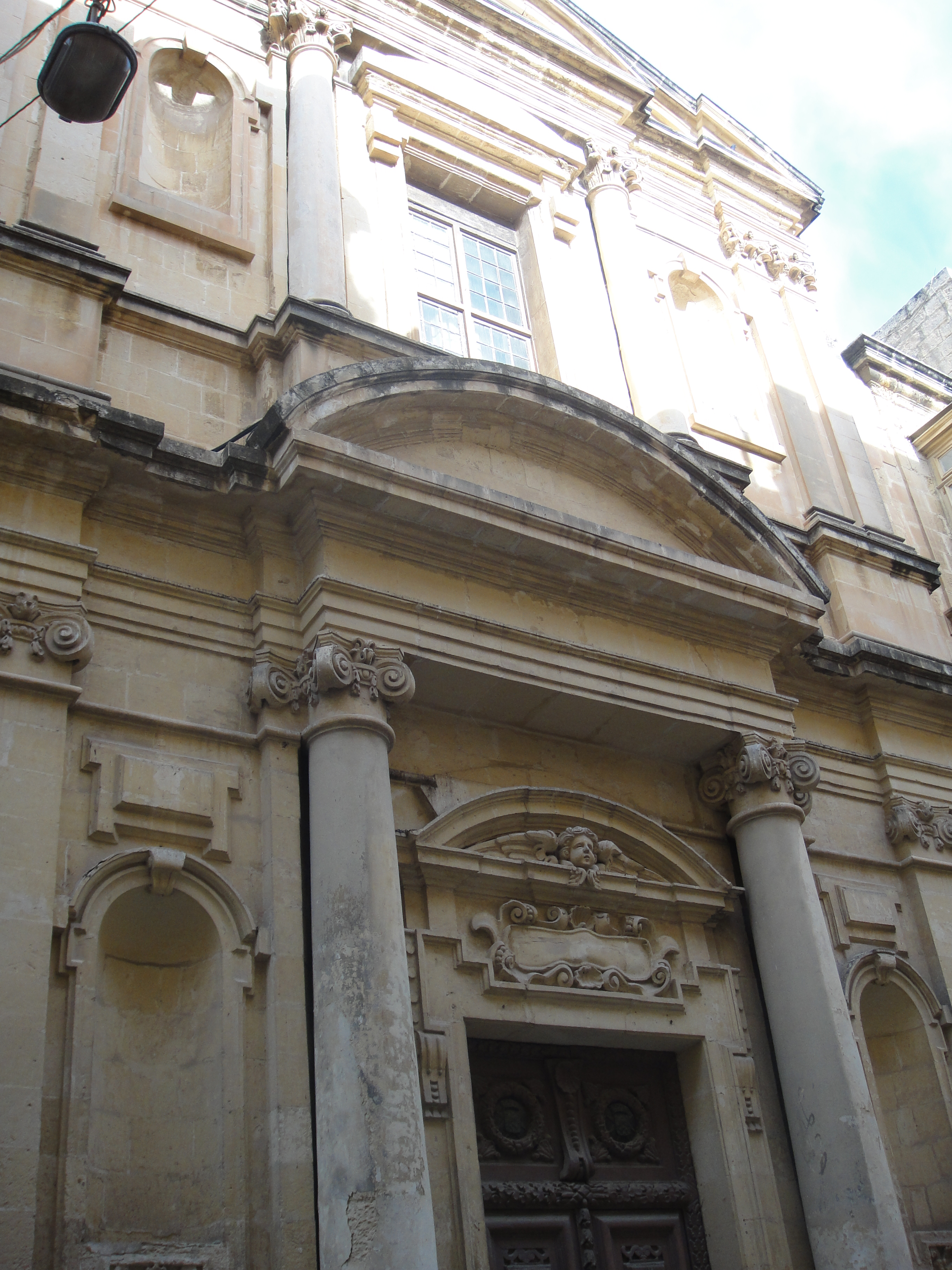
- Church of Our Lady of Pilar
- 35°54′04.2″N 14°30′46.6″E
- Location: Valletta, Malta
- Denomination: Roman Catholic

History
- Founded: 1670
- Dedication: Our Lady of the Pillar

Architecture
- Heritage designation: Scheduled
- Architect: Romano Carapecchia
- Architectural type: Church
- Style: Baroque
- Completed: 1718

Specifications
- Materials: Limestone

Administration
- Archdiocese: Malta

The Church of Our Lady of the Pillar (Maltese: Knisja tal-Madonna tal-Pilar) is a 17th-century church located in Valletta, Malta. The church was built as the church of the Aragonese knights and modeled according to the plans of the architect Romano Carapecchia. The church is listed on the National Inventory of the Cultural Property of the Maltese Islands.

== Origins ==
The church was built in the 1670s as the church of the Aragonese knights. It was built adjacent to the Auberge d'Aragon. The cornerstone was laid by Grandmaster Nicolas Cotoner and its construction was financed mainly by the Balì of Majorca Raimondo de Soler and Felice Inniges de Ayerba, the Bali of Caspe'. The latter was buried in the same church in front of the high altar. The church that was built in 1670 was damaged by the earthquake of 1693. Thus the church was remodelled on the plans of Romano Carapecchia. The church was completed in 1718. It was funded by Grandmaster Ramon Perellos y Roccaful.

== Architecture ==
The church has a narrow façade ingeniously modelled into three bays on two levels with the centre bays projecting slightly. The composition gives the impression that the façade is larger than it actually is. In the remodelling of the church Carapecchia accentuated the vertical dimension of the façade by having superimposed pilasters of equal heights. The upper columns and pilasters are slightly more slender than the lower ones. The interior is highly decorated with sculpture.

== Works of Art ==
The titular painting, depicting Our Lady appearing to St James, was done by Stefano Erardi. On top of the painting is another painting of the Eternal Father. The ceiling was painted by Gio Nicola Buhagiar. It depicts the coronation of Our Lady. The painting was donated by Grandmaster Perellos since at the corner one can see his coat of arms. There are also four other paintings depicting the Nativity of Mary, the Marriage of Mary, the Annunciation and the Visitation. On top of the organ gallery one can see a painting on the wall that depicts Grandmaster Perellos greeting the Balì of Majorca Raimondo de Soler.

== Restoration ==
The church was restored between 1989 and 1991. It was given to Heritage Malta in 2007. Formerly the church used to be owned by the Franciscan nuns.

== See also ==
- Culture of Malta
- History of Malta
- List of Churches in Malta
- Religion in Malta
- Cathedral-Basilica of Our Lady of the Pillar in Zaragoza
