= Bombardier =

Bombardier may refer to:

== Armed forces ==
- Bombardier (rank), rank equivalent to corporal used in some artillery corps
- Bombardier (aircrew), crew member on a bomber aircraft
- Artillery crewman, archaically

== Businesses ==
- Bombardier Inc., a Canadian company mainly specializing in air and railway vehicles
  - Bombardier Aviation, the aircraft division
  - Bombardier Transportation, the defunct railway equipment division
- Bombardier Recreational Products, a manufacturer of snowcats and snowmobiles, part of Bombardier Inc. until 2003

== People ==
- Bombardier Billy Wells (1889–1967), English heavyweight boxer
- Charles Bombardier (born 1974), Canadian industrial designer and entrepreneur
- Denise Bombardier (1941–2023), Canadian journalist
- Fiona Bombardier (born 2005), Canadian pair skater
- Jean-Michel Bombardier (born 1970), Canadian skater
- Joseph-Armand Bombardier (1907–1964), Canadian inventor and businessman, founder of Bombardier Inc.
- Louise Bombardier (born 1953), Canadian actress and writer

== Others ==
- Bombardier (film), a 1943 film about aircrew training, starring Pat O'Brien, Randolph Scott, Robert Ryan and Eddie Albert
- Bombardier beetle, insect of family Carabidae
- Bombardier Bitter, a beer brewed by Marston's in England
- Attleboro High School, a high school in Massachusetts with their team name being “Bombardiers.”
