= Church and Monastery of St Catherine, Valletta =

Church of the Presentation of Our Lady / St Catherine
- Knisja tal-Preżentazzjoni tal-Madonna; Knisja ta' Santa Katerina
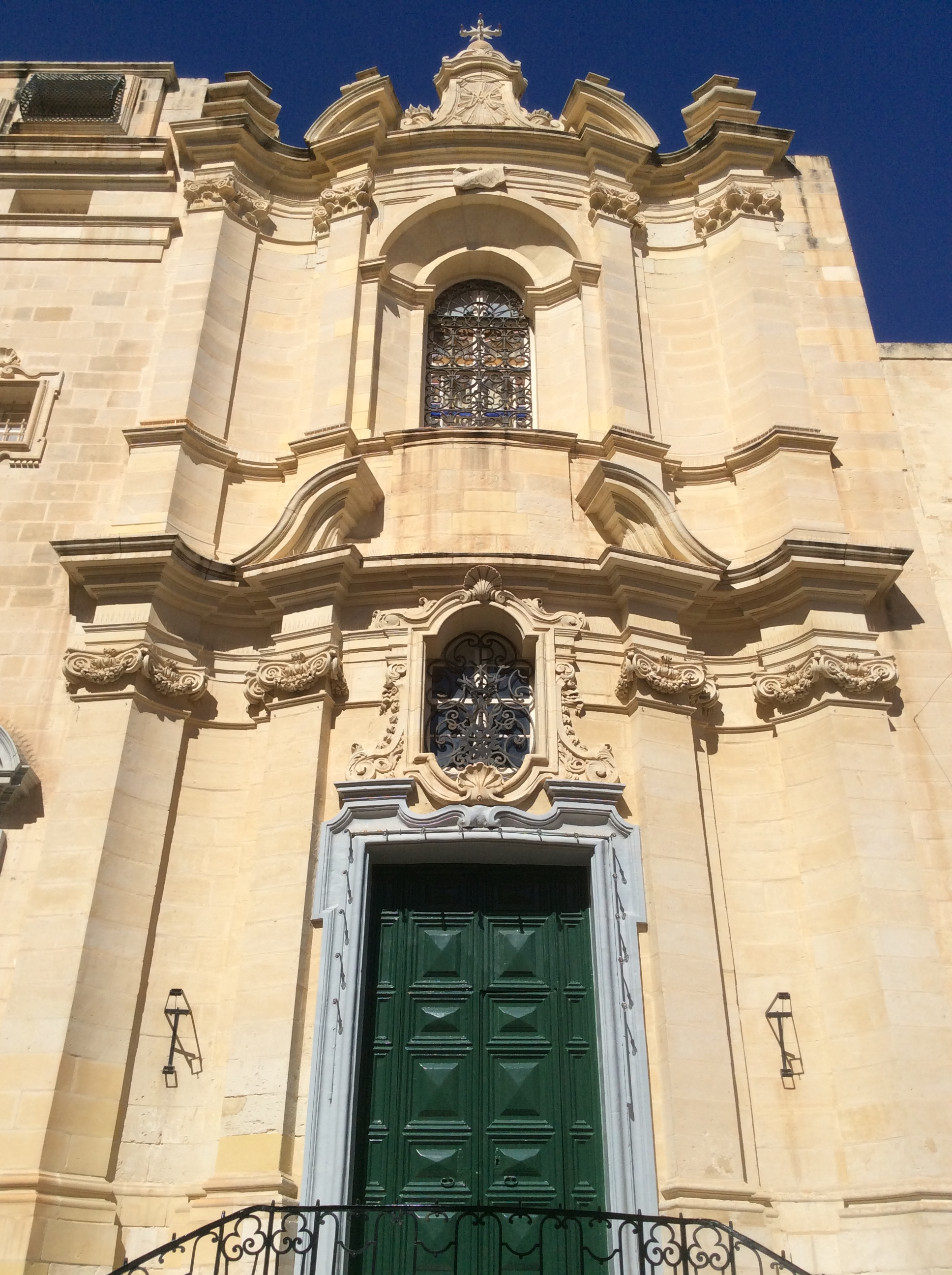
- The church's façade in 2017
- Church of the Presentation of Our Lady / St Catherine
- 35°53′59.4″N 14°30′53.7″E
- Location: Valletta, Malta
- Denomination: Roman Catholic
- Religious order: Second Order of Saint Augustine

History
- Status: Church
- Dedication: Presentation of Mary

Architecture
- Functional status: Active
- Architect: Romano Carapecchia
- Style: Baroque
- Years built: 1714

Specifications
- Materials: Limestone

Administration
- Archdiocese: Malta
- Parish: Valletta (St Dominic)

St Catherine's Monastery (Maltese: Monasteru Santa Katerina ta' Lixandra) is a monastery in Valletta, Malta which houses cloistered nuns of the Second Order of Saint Augustine. It incorporates the Church of the Presentation of Our Lady (Maltese: Knisja tal-Preżentazzjoni tal-Madonna), which is more commonly known as the Church of St Catherine (Maltese: Knisja ta' Santa Katerina). The church and monastery were built in the 18th century and they replaced a previous monastery which had been housed in a 16th-century palace.

== History ==
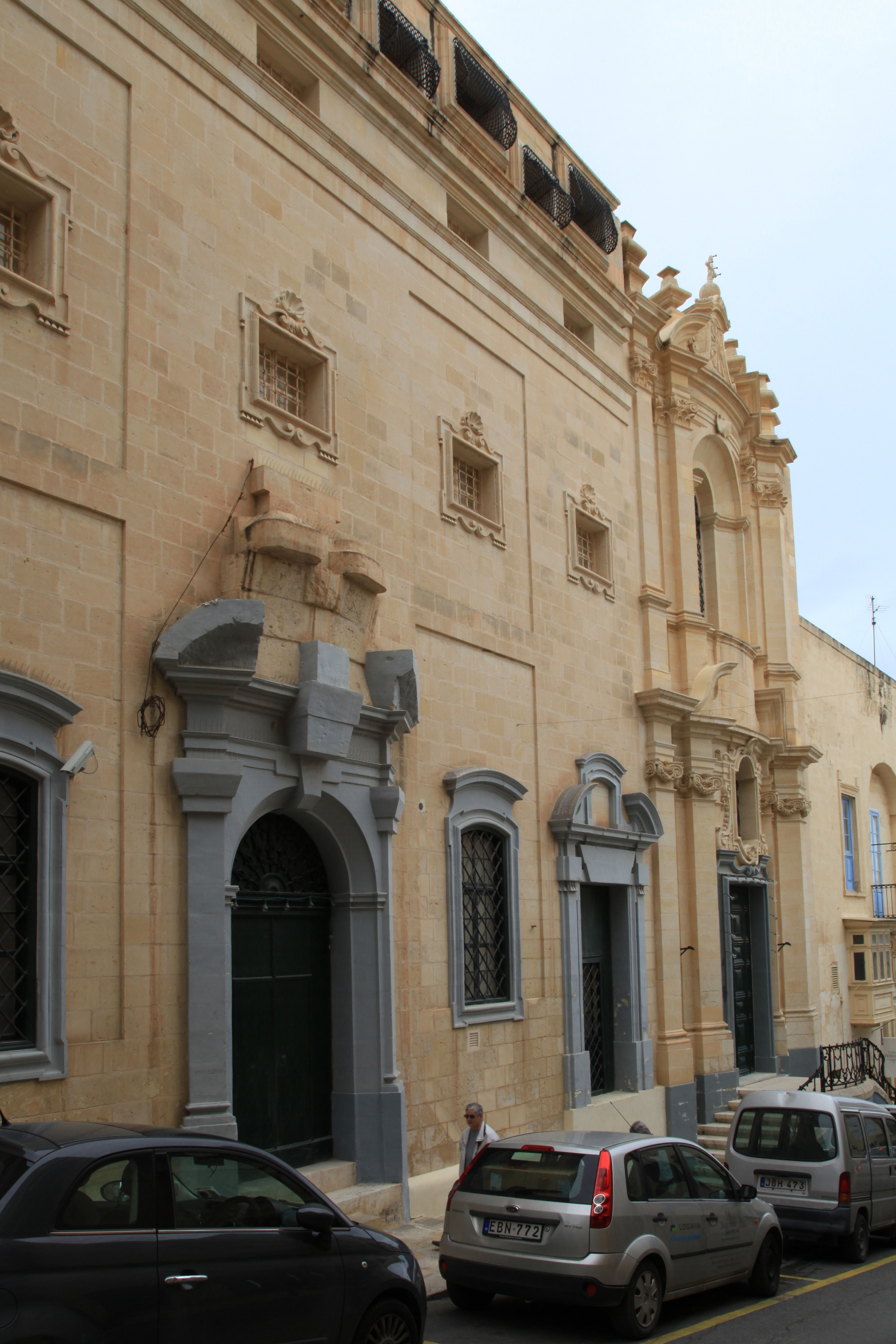
The monastery (left) and church (right) in 2013

The origins of St Catherine's Monastery date back to 1580, when the palace of the Marquis Giovanni and Katerina Vasco Oliviero in Valletta began to house the Orfani della Misericordia, a community of women who took care of children. Vasco Oliviero left his possessions to the community, and the palace was transformed into a monastery in 1601. A chapel dedicated to the Assumption of Mary was added to the monastery in the 17th century.

The monastery and church were rebuilt in the 18th century to designs of the architect Romano Carapecchia. Construction began in 1714 and continued for several decades. The new church was dedicated to the Presentation of Mary.

In 1849, Pope Pius IX recognized it as a community of Augustinian nuns, and 16 nuns made their profession on 3 September 1851. They have been recognised as being part of the Second Order of Saint Augustine since 1946.

Since 2023 the cloisters, garden and crypt underneath the monastery have been made available to the public – known as "The Mysterium Fidei museum".

The church falls under the jurisdiction of Valletta's parish of St Dominic. It is listed on the National Inventory of the Cultural Property of the Maltese Islands.

== Architecture ==
The church is built in the Baroque style. The monastery includes a garden.
