= Martino Longhi the Elder =

Italian architect

Martino Longhi the Elder (1534–1591) was an Italian architect, the father of Onorio Longhi and the grandfather of Martino Longhi the Younger. He is also known as Martino Lunghi.

He was born in Viggiù into a family of architects, and initially worked in Germany for the Altemps family, who were relatives of the Milanese Borromeo. Later, he was hired by Pope Pius IV to work, along with Giorgio Vasari and Jacopo Barozzi da Vignola, on the church of Santa Croce in Bosco Marengo, the pope's hometown (1566–1572).

Longhi moved to Rome in 1569. Here he worked to Palazzo Altemps, Palazzo Borghese (the court, possibly inspired to Pellegrino Tibaldi's modules) and designed the churches of Santa Maria della Consolazione, Palazzo Cesi-Armellini and San Girolamo degli Schiavoni. Also by Longhi is the tower of Palazzo Senatorio, in the Capitol Hill, which he modified from the original Michelangelo's design.

He died in Rome in 1591.

== Sources ==
- Boni, Filippo de' (1852). Biografia degli artisti ovvero dizionario della vita e delle opere dei pittori, degli scultori, degli intagliatori, dei tipografi e dei musici di ogni nazione che fiorirono da' tempi più remoti sino a' nostri giorni. Seconda Edizione. (in Italian). Venice; Googlebooks: Presso Andrea Santini and Figlio. p. 589.
