= Church of St James, Valletta =

Church of St James the Greater
- Knisja ta' San Ġakbu il-Kbir
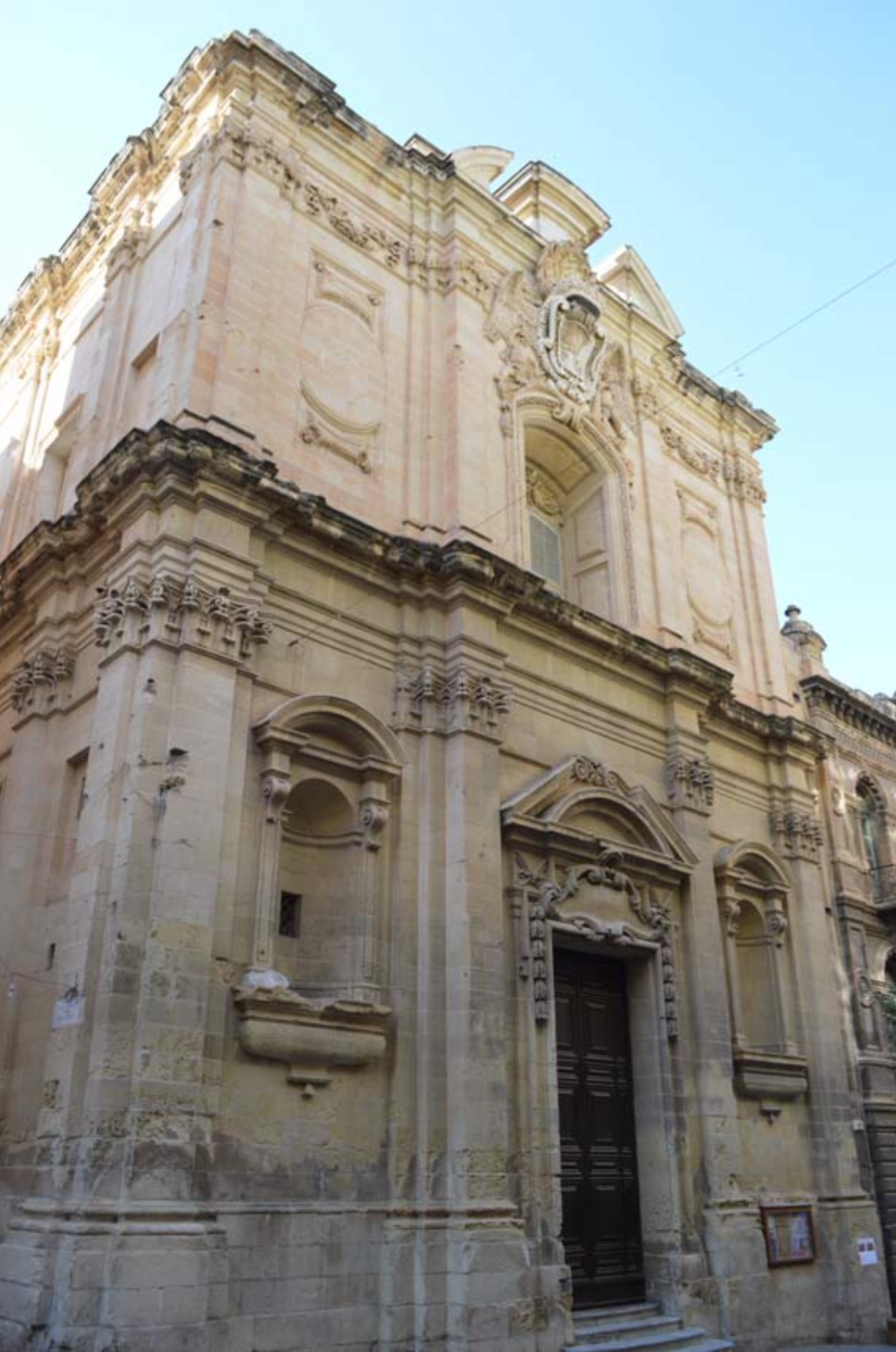
- Church of St James the Greater
- 35°53′48.0″N 14°30′42.1″E
- Location: Valletta, Malta
- Denomination: Roman Catholic

History
- Status: Active
- Founded: 1612
- Dedication: St James the Greater

Architecture
- Functional status: Church
- Heritage designation: Antiques list, Grade 1, National monument
- Designated: 2008
- Architect: Romano Carapecchia
- Architectural type: Italian Baroque
- Style: Baroque
- Completed: 1710

Specifications
- Materials: Limestone

Administration
- Archdiocese: Malta

Clergy
- Rector: Joseph Pace

The Church of St James is a Roman Catholic church in Valletta, Malta. A previous Mannerist church was built on site in the early 17th century and demolished in the early 18th century to build the present baroque church. Built on the designs of Romano Carrapecchia, the church served for religious service to the Langue of Castille. It remain an active church, found in Merchants Street, and it is a scheduled cultural building in a World Heritage Site. The church has a number of artistic features, including its imposing façade and paintings, one drawn by Filippo Paladini and another dating back than the present church itself. Nowadays the church is also used for services by the Ethiopian Orthodox Tewahedo Church and the Eritrean Orthodox Tewahedo Church.

== History ==
The first church was built in 1612, but was later demolished to build a new baroque church between 1709 and 1710. Some unreliable sources have attributed the designs of the church to architect Giovanni Barbara. However, the architect was Romano Carapecchia, who designed the church in Italian baroque.

The church building is listed on the National Inventory of the Cultural Property of the Maltese Islands.

== Exterior of the church ==
The façade of the church includes pillars, niches, windows and baroque designs. The church is 2 stories high. Above the main door one can see a big window. Above it one can see the coat of arms of the Kingdom of Castile held by two angels with a seashell on top.

At one point in the 18th century the church's exterior was redesigned, by the known architect Romano Carapecchia, when it was given a Baroque character.

== Interior of the church ==
The interior of the church is built on the form of an oval excluding the sanctuary of the church. The titular painting was done by Filippo Paladini. It depicts St James the Greater at the entrance of a cave holding a stick and an angel holding a palm leaf symbolizing his martyrdom. Below the titular painting one can see an oval painting depicting Our Lady of Sorrows. It is a copy of a Spanish painting found in Madrid known as the Madonna di Soledad. The painting was brought to Malta in 1646 by cleric of the Order of St John.

== See also ==
- Culture of Malta
- History of Malta
- List of Churches in Malta
- Religion in Malta
