= Church of St Lucy, Valletta =

Church of St Lucy
- Knisja ta' Santa Luċija ta' Sirakuża
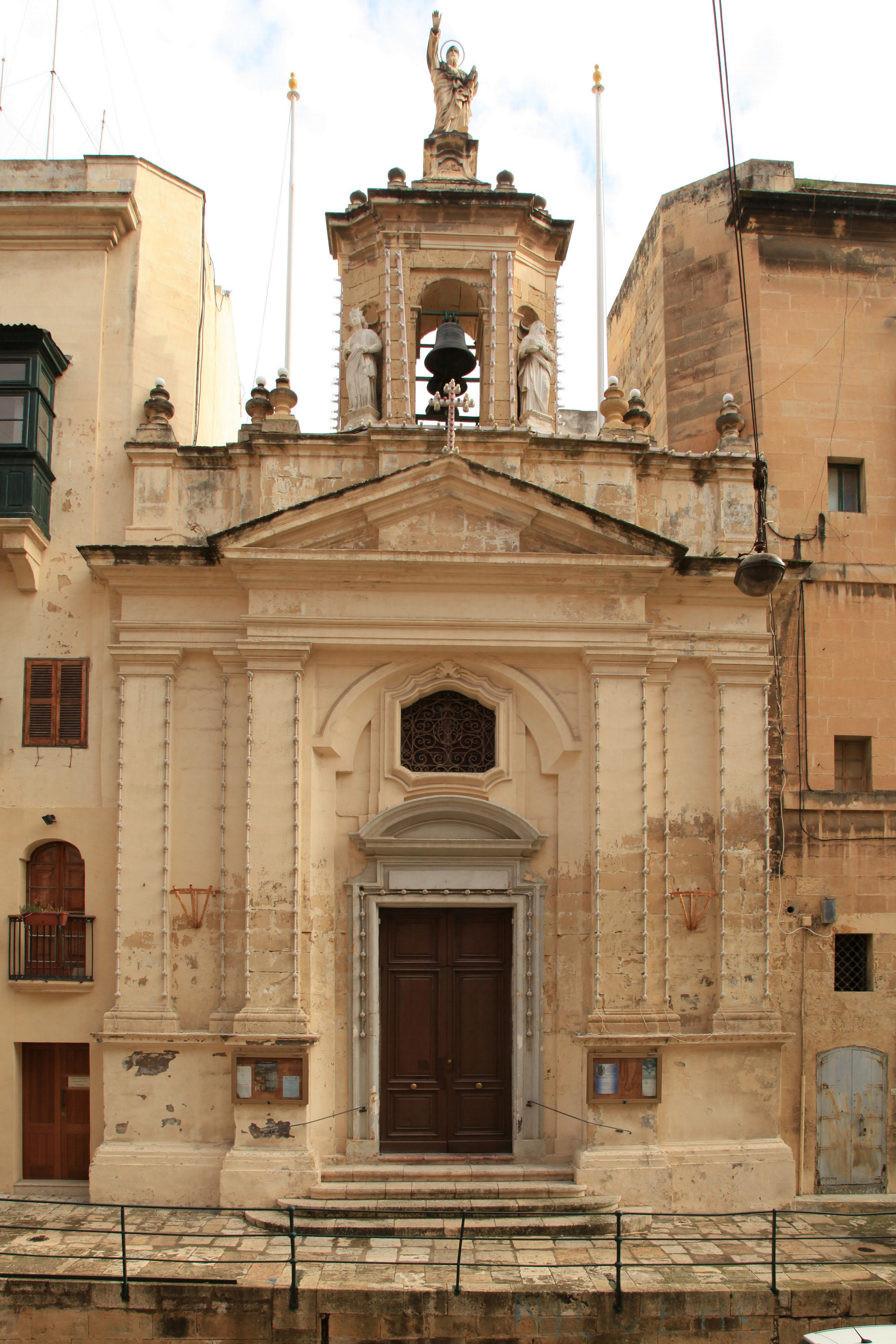

- Location within Malta
- 35°53′47.2″N 14°30′51.6″E
- Location: Valletta
- Country: Malta
- Denomination: Roman Catholic

History
- Status: Active
- Founded: 1570
- Dedication: Saint Lucy

Architecture
- Functional status: Church
- Style: Baroque

Administration
- Archdiocese: Malta

Clergy
- Rector: Joseph Grech Cremona

The Church of Saint Lucy is a small Roman Catholic church situated in Valletta, Malta. The church was built in 1570 and features a titular painting above the high altar and the corpse of St Lucian, the martyr.

== History ==
The church of St Lucy was built in 1570, four years after the construction of the city of Valletta began. It was originally dedicated to St Francis of Paola, a statue of whom is on the corner of St Lucy's street, just opposite the church. The first Dominicans who came to Valletta from Birgu administered the sacraments from this church before their own church was constructed. The church was rebuilt with money paid by the wine merchants of Valletta. After the church was rebuilt, it was dedicated to Saint Lucy and Saint Vincent Ferrer.

The church building is listed on the National Inventory of the Cultural Property of the Maltese Islands.

== Works of art ==
The titular painting on top of the high altar depicts the Immaculate Conception with Saint Paul, Saint Lucy, Saint Vincent Ferrer and Saint Clare. Beneath the high altar, one can find the corpse of St Lucian the Martyr, brought from the cemetery of Priscilla in Rome. The side altars are dedicated to St Francis of Paola and St Paschal Baylon.

== Feast day ==
The feast of Saint Lucy is celebrated every year from 1 December and ends on the liturgical feast of the saint on 13 December.

== See also ==
- Culture of Malta
- History of Malta
- List of churches in Malta
- Religion in Malta
