= Banca Giuratale (Valletta) =

- Banka Ġuratali
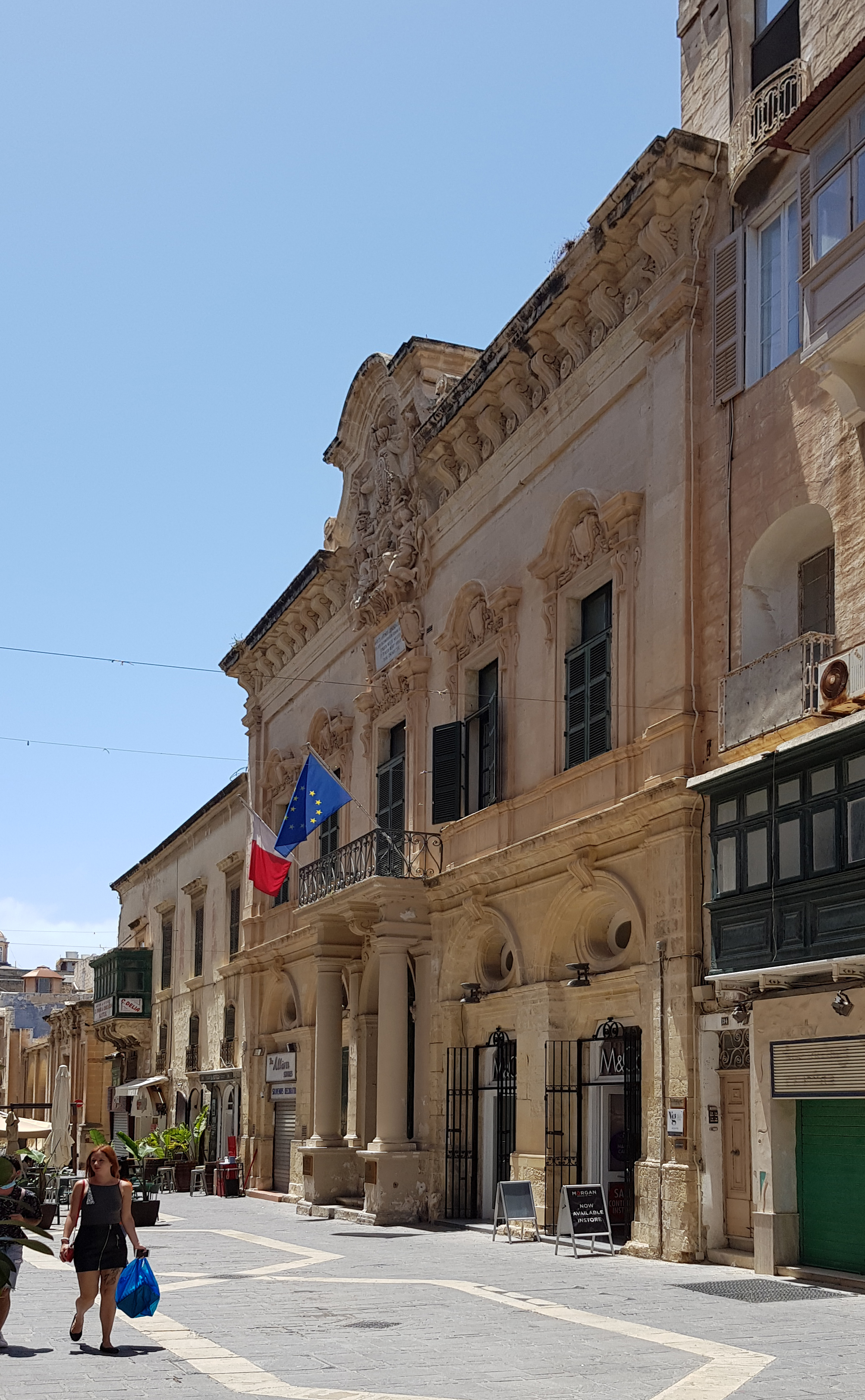
- The Banca Giuratale in 2020
- Interactive map of the Banca Giuratale area
- Former names: Palazzo della Città; Consolato del Mare
- Alternative names: Municipal Palace

General information
- Status: Intact
- Type: City hall
- Architectural style: Baroque
- Location: Valletta, Malta
- Coordinates: 35°53′52″N 14°30′49.1″E
- Current tenants: Ministry for the Economy, Enterprise and Strategic Projects
- Completed: 1721
- Owner: Government of Malta

Technical details
- Material: Limestone
- Floor count: 2

Design and construction
- Architect: Romano Carapecchia

The Banca Giuratale (Maltese: Banka Ġuratali), formerly also known as Banca dei Giurati, the Municipal Palace (Maltese: Palazz Muniċipali), the Palazzo della Città, Casa Città and the Consolato del Mare, is a public building in Valletta, Malta. It was built in the 18th century to house the city's administrative council, and it was subsequently used as the General Post Office and the Public Registry. The Banca Giuratale now houses the Ministry for the Economy, Enterprise and Strategic Projects, and it is officially known as Palazzo Zondadari.

== History ==
The Banca Giuratale was originally a house which belonged to Dr. Gio Batta Piotto, and it was taken over by the treasury of the Order of St. John in 1665. In 1721, the Università, which was the local administrative council of Valletta, acquired the building in exchange for its original premises located across the street (now the Monte di Pietà). The building was subsequently reconstructed during the magistracy of Grand Master Marc'Antonio Zondadari. The new building was designed by the architect Romano Carapecchia.

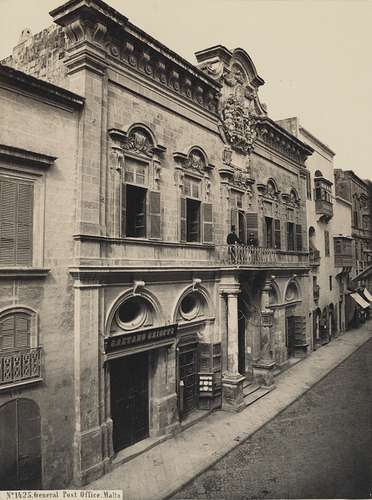
The Banca Giuratale in the 19th century, when it was the GPO

The Banca Giuratale was renovated in 1762, during the magistracy of Manuel Pinto da Fonseca. Napoleon is said to have spent his last night in Malta, between 13 and 14 June 1798, at this building. The Banca Giuratale remained in use by the Università until that body was suppressed by Governor Thomas Maitland in 1818.

In 1841, the Banca Giuratale became a post office when the Packet Office was transferred there from the Casa del Commun Tesoro in Piazza Tesoreria. The Island Post Office was also transferred into the Banca Giuratale on 1 April 1849, and the two were merged into the General Post Office in 1885. A year later, the GPO moved to Palazzo Parisio.

For many years, the Banca Giuratale housed the Public Registry. The latter has now moved to Evans Building, and the Banca Giuratale now houses the Ministry for the Economy, Investment and Small Business.

The building was included on the Antiquities List of 1925. It is now a Grade 1 national monument, and it is also listed on the National Inventory of the Cultural Property of the Maltese Islands.

The façade was restored sometimes in 2014.

== Architecture ==
The Banca Giuratale is built in the Baroque style. The main portal is flanked by Doric columns which support an open balcony. Two arcades are located on either side of the doorway, above which are oval windows set in blind arches. The first floor contains five ornate windows, and an ornate centrepiece is located above the central window. This includes a bust of Grand Master Zondadari, carved figures and drapery and a marble slab with the following Latin inscription:

MARCUS ANTONIUS ZONDADARIUS M. M.
HAS ÆDES IN COMMODIOREM FORMAM REDACTAS
PUBLICIS MELITÆ NEGOCIIS
ET PUBLICÆ PIETATI APERUIT
ANNO DNI. MDCCXXI.

The centrepiece also contained a number of coats of arms, but these were probably defaced during the French occupation of 1798–1800. The central coat of arms was later replaced by the British royal arms in the early 19th century.
