= San Giovanni Calibita, Rome =

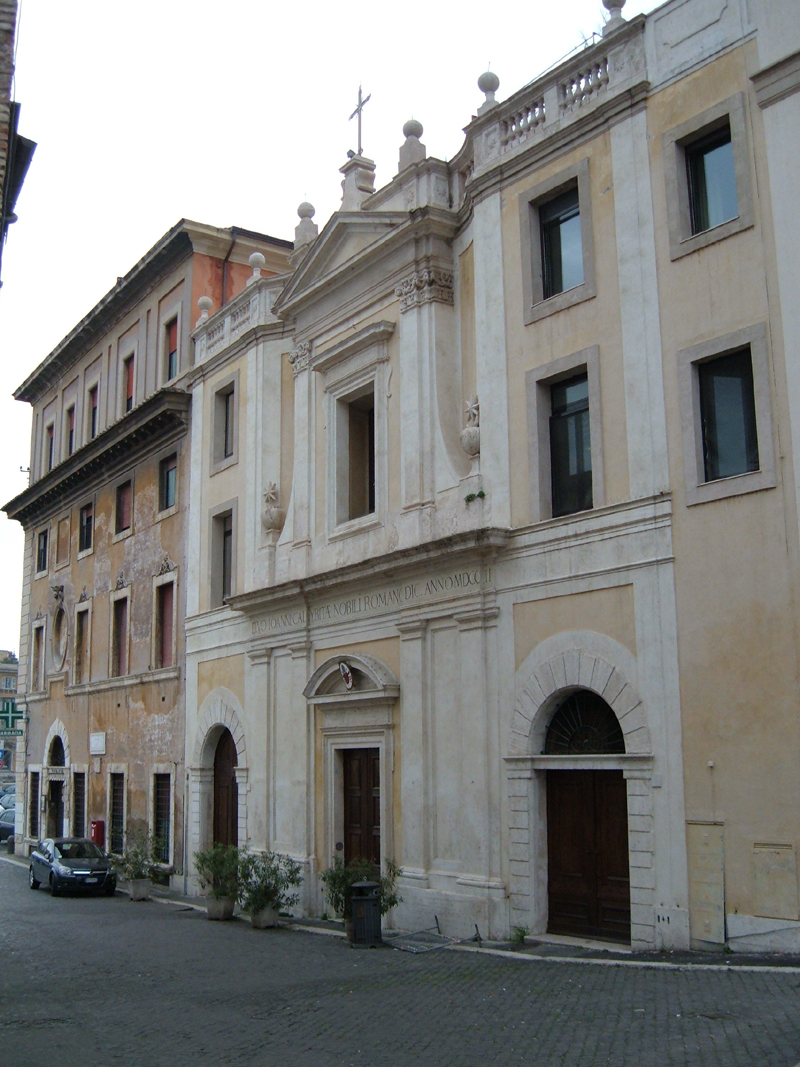
- Façade
- Click on the map for a fullscreen view
- 41°53′27″N 12°28′40″E
- Location: Isola Tiberina, Rome
- Country: Italy
- Denomination: Roman Catholic

Architecture
- Architectural type: Church

San Giovanni Calibita is a Roman Catholic church located in the rione of Ripa on the Isola Tiberina, next to the Fatebenefratelli Hospital.

== History ==
A church here is documented since the 14th century with the name of Sancti Ioannis de insula, and also Sancti Ioannis Cantofiume. But it is likely a church was established over the site of the temple of Iuppiter Iurarius. Armellini says the first church here was raised by the soldiers of Genseric and rebuilt in 464 by Peter, bishop of Porto, who held the jurisdiction of the Isola Tiberina. However the oldest documentary annotation of this church is found in a 1018 bull by Pope Benedict VIII. For centuries it was attached to the nearby Benedictine monastery. The present church was begun in 1584, atop the ruins of the older church. During this latter construction, the remains of the saint Giovanni Calibita, were putatively found under the main altar. The church was reconstructed in 1640, with the façade completed in 1711, and the rich interior painted decoration completed by 1742 by Corrado Giaquinto.

The church contains an icon of the Madonna della lampada from the 13th century. This image traditionally was associated with a miracle: it was once at the river's edge with a votive lamp, however during the flood of 1557, while submerged, the fire in the lamp was not extinguished.

== Bibliography ==
- Mariano Armellini, Le chiese di Roma dal secolo IV al XIX, Roma 1891
- Christian Hülsen, Le chiese di Roma nel Medio Evo, Firenze 1927
- F. Titi, Descrizione delle Pitture, Sculture e Architetture esposte in Roma, Roma 1763
- C. Rendina, Le Chiese di Roma, Newton & Compton Editori, Milano 2000, p. 132
- A. Manodori, Rione XII Ripa, in AA.VV, I rioni di Roma, Newton & Compton Editori, Milano 2000, Vol. II, pp. 766–830
- Extracted from Italian Wikipedia
