= Ġnien is-Sultan =

- Giardino della Marina
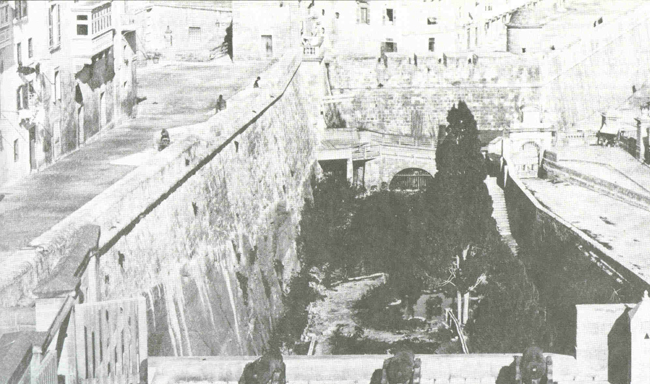
- View of the garden circa 1880s
- Interactive map of Ġnien is-Sultan
- Type: Garden
- Location: Valletta, Malta
- Coordinates: 35°53′40.2″N 14°30′46.7″E
- Opened: 17th century
- Closed: 19th–20th centuries
- Founder: Giovanni Paolo Lascaris
- Status: Destroyed

Ġnien is-Sultan (Maltese for King's Garden), also known as the Giardino della Marina (Italian for Marina Garden), the Grand Master's Garden or Lascaris Garden, was a garden in Valletta, Malta. It was established in the 17th century by Giovanni Paolo Lascaris, and included a summer residence for the Grand Master. The garden included several Baroque elements designed by Francesco Buonamici.

The summer residence and part of the garden was destroyed by the British military in the 19th century to make way for Lascaris Battery, a casemated artillery battery which was named after the Grand Master who had built the gardens. The remaining part of the garden was destroyed in the 20th century, and its site is now occupied by social housing blocks. The only major remain of the garden is a Baroque fountain in situ.

== History ==
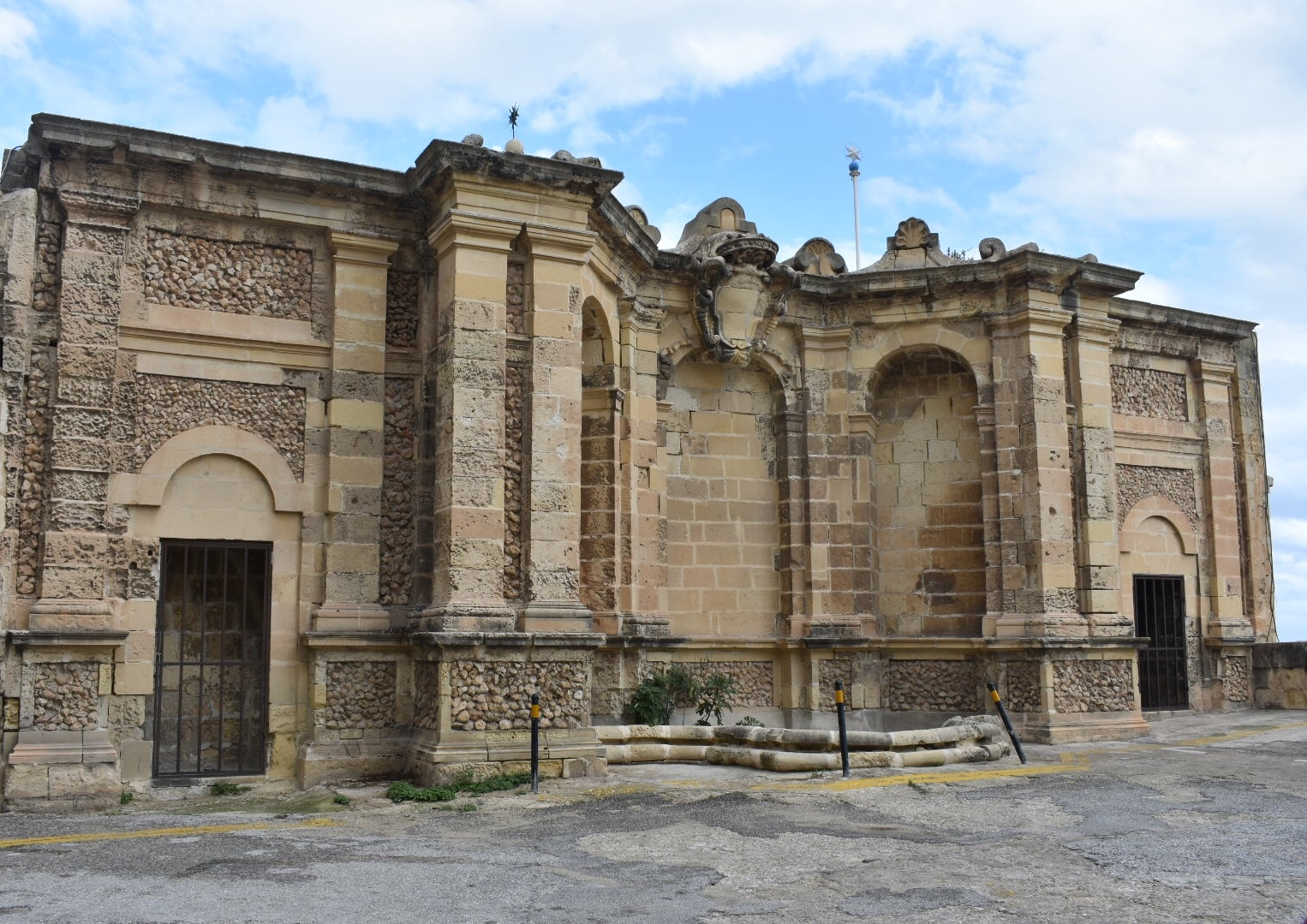
Original fountain by Francesco Buonamici

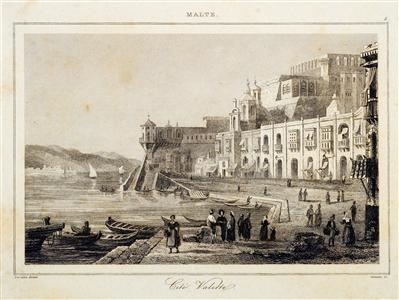
An 1848 engraving of the Valletta Marina, with the garden instead of Lascaris Battery

When Francesco Laparelli designed the fortifications of Valletta in 1566, he designed a two-tiered demi-bastion known as St. Peter and St. Paul Bastion on the eastern extremity of the city's land front, overlooking the Grand Harbour. The demi-bastion was too high to offer adequate defence, so in the early 17th century the rocky shore below it was reshaped into a faussebraye (or tenaille) with a rock-hewn ditch stretching from the bastion to the Del Monte Gate. Construction was entrusted to the local contractor Maestro Xara. This rampart became known as Lascaris Bastion, after Grand Master Giovanni Paolo Lascaris, who had commissioned its construction.

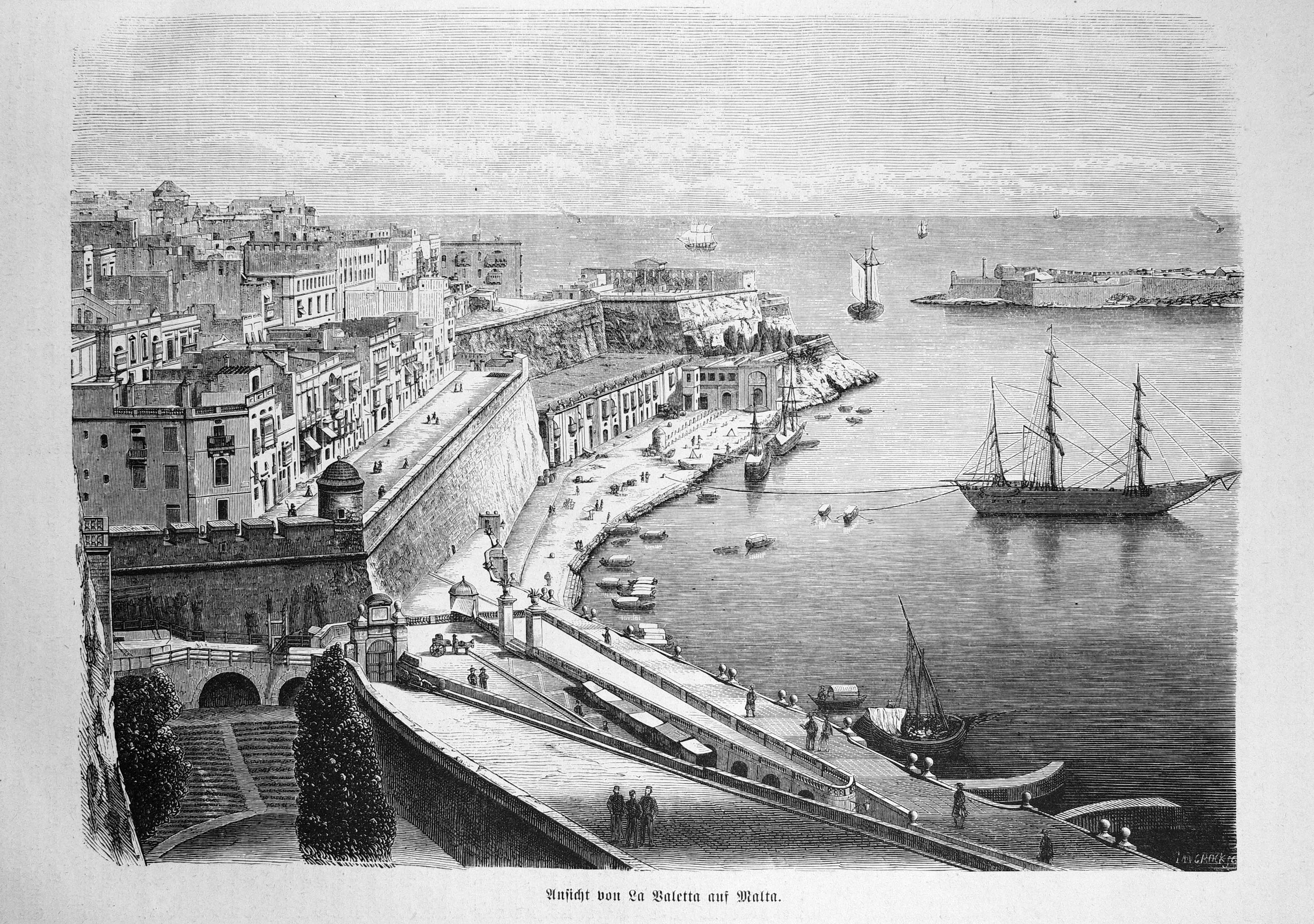
View of Valletta in 1874, with part of the garden visible at the lower left

Soon after the rampart was completed, Grand Master Lascaris requisitioned the site and built a summer residence with a garden there. The garden contained a belvedere and several fountains which were supplied by water from the Wignacourt Aqueduct. The garden became the focal point of the Valletta Marina, which also included the Church of Our Lady of Liesse, Neptune's Fountain and the Del Monte Gate. The area became one of the most picturesque parts of Valletta, and it was depicted in several paintings in the 17th and 19th centuries.

The baroque garden, which included a number of evergreen fruit trees mainly consisting of lemon trees, the triumphal arch (the gate) and two elaborate baroque fountains were designed by architect Buonamici.

By 1839, the Grand Master's summer residence housed the superintendent of the quarantine department and of the port of Valletta.

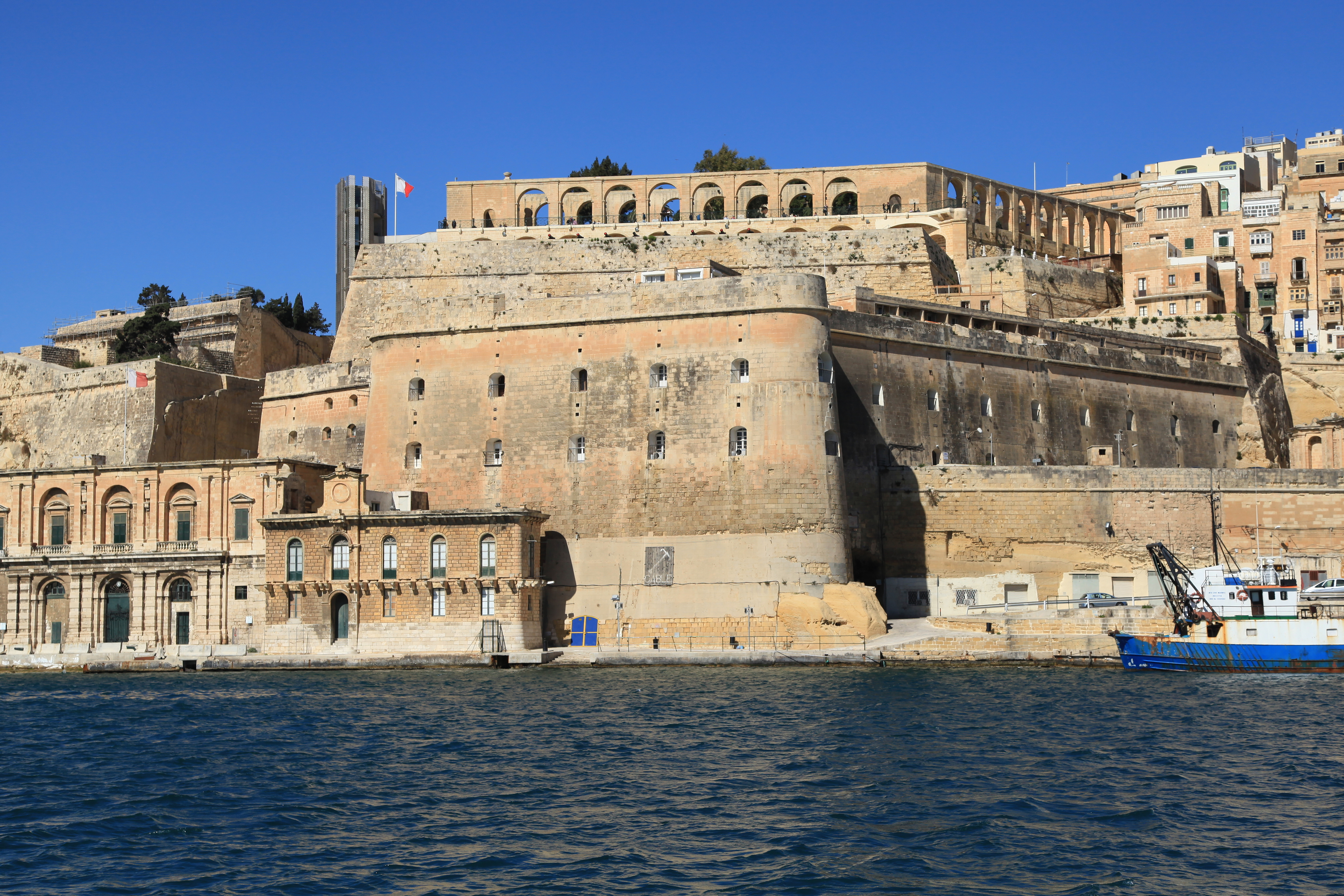
Lascaris Battery, which was built on the site of the garden

The summer residence and part of the garden was destroyed in the mid-19th century to make way for the Lascaris Battery, a casemated artillery battery which was built by the British military in order to defend the Grand Harbour, in particular the newly built drydock. Eventually, case bottege began to be built on the remaining parts of the garden, and the site was fully built up as social housing blocks in the 1980s.

== Remains ==
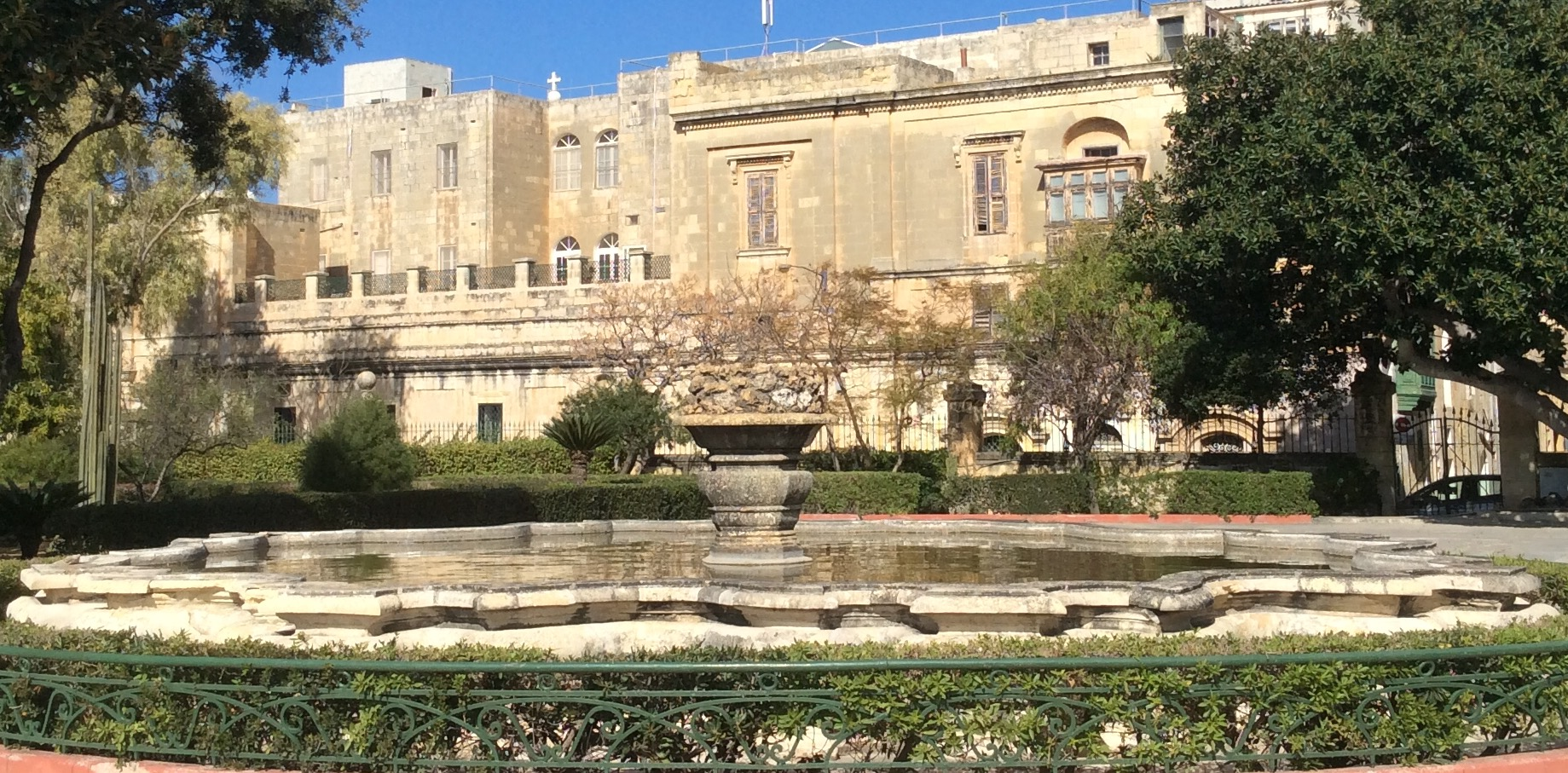
Fountain originally located at Ġnien is-Sultan, now at Argotti Gardens in Floriana

Very few remains from the garden still survive. The lower part of a staircase which led to the Grand Master's summer residence can still be seen at the base of Lascaris Battery. The garden's belvedere has also survived. A fountain from the garden was discovered in 1956 during excavations in the ruins, and it was relocated to Argotti Gardens in Floriana, where it remains today. The fountain has a concave basin with bays divided by Tuscan pillars.

Another fountain is still on site. It was restored in 1987 and, according to an installed plaque, it was inaugurated again by Minister Ugo Mifsud Bonnici. The belvedere and fountain are scheduled as Grade 1 by the Malta Environment and Planning Authority. Details of the Baroque garden, including its trees and Baroque fountains are found in British periods literature.
