= Victoria Gate (Valletta) =

- Il-Bieb Victoria
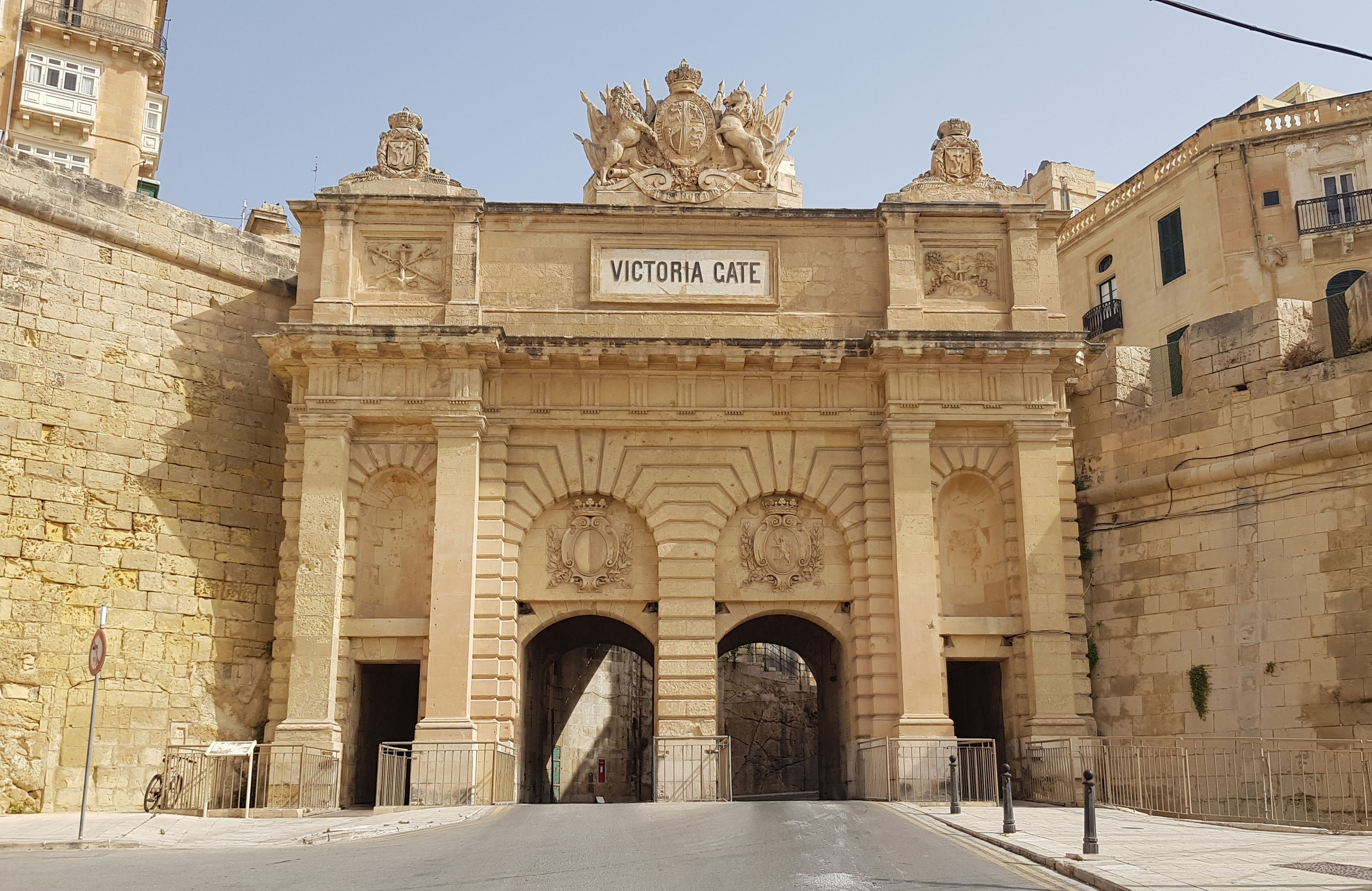
- Victoria Gate after restoration
- Interactive map of the Victoria Gate area

General information
- Status: Intact
- Type: City gate
- Architectural style: Victorian
- Location: Valletta, Malta
- Coordinates: 35°53′45.6″N 14°30′49.2″E
- Named for: Queen Victoria
- Construction started: 1884
- Completed: 1885
- Owner: Government of Malta

Technical details
- Material: Limestone

Design and construction
- Architect: Emanuele Luigi Galizia

Victoria Gate (Maltese: Bieb Vittorja, Italian: Porta Victoria or Porta Vittoria) is a city gate in Valletta, Malta. It was built by the British in 1885, and was named after Queen Victoria. The gate is the main entrance into the city from the Grand Harbour area, which was once the busiest part of the city. The gate is located between Marina Curtain and St. Barbara Bastion, on the site of the 16th-century Del Monte Gate.

Victoria Gate is the only surviving gate within the fortifications of Valletta, since all the other fortified gates were demolished in the 19th and 20th centuries. Today, the only other gate is the City Gate, which was built in 2014 to a modern design.

== History ==
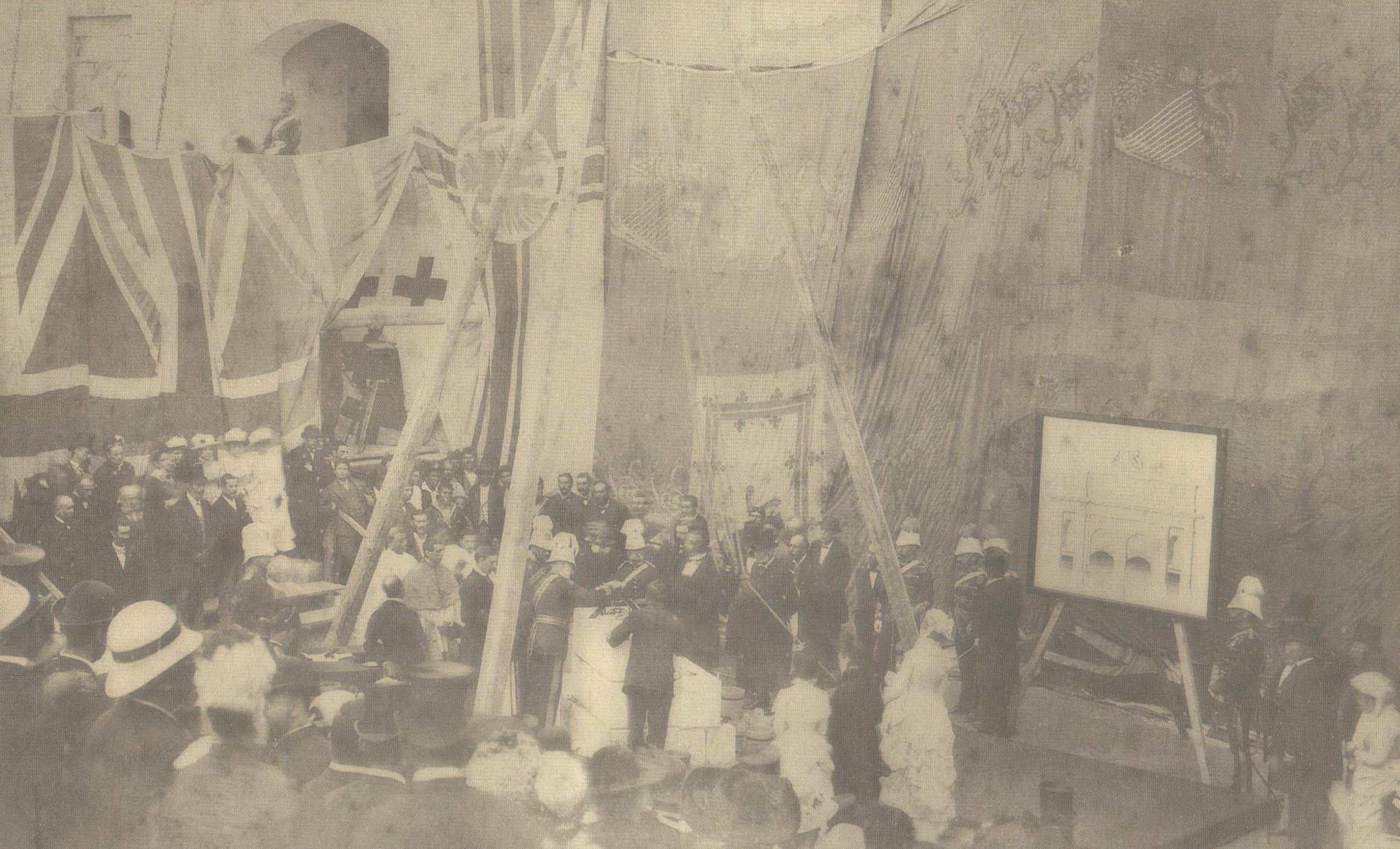
Governor Arthur Borton laying the foundation of Victoria Gate, 27 May 1884

When Valletta was founded in 1566, a system of bastioned fortifications was built around the city, to a design by the Italian military engineer Francesco Laparelli. The city only had three gates, the main one being known as Porta San Giorgio, and two smaller gates on either side of the city which were known as the Marsamxett Gate and Del Monte Gate.

Del Monte Gate (Italian: Porta Del Monte) was built in 1569 to a design by Laparelli, and it was named after Grand Master Pierre de Monte. This gate was located between Marina Curtain and St. Barbara Bastion on the eastern side of the city, facing the Grand Harbour. The area around it became a small marina, and the gate was also called the Marina Gate (Italian: Porta Marina) since it provided access to the city from the marina. The area around the gate bustled with activity, and it included a garden known as Ġnien is-Sultan, the Church of Our Lady of Liesse and the Fish Market.

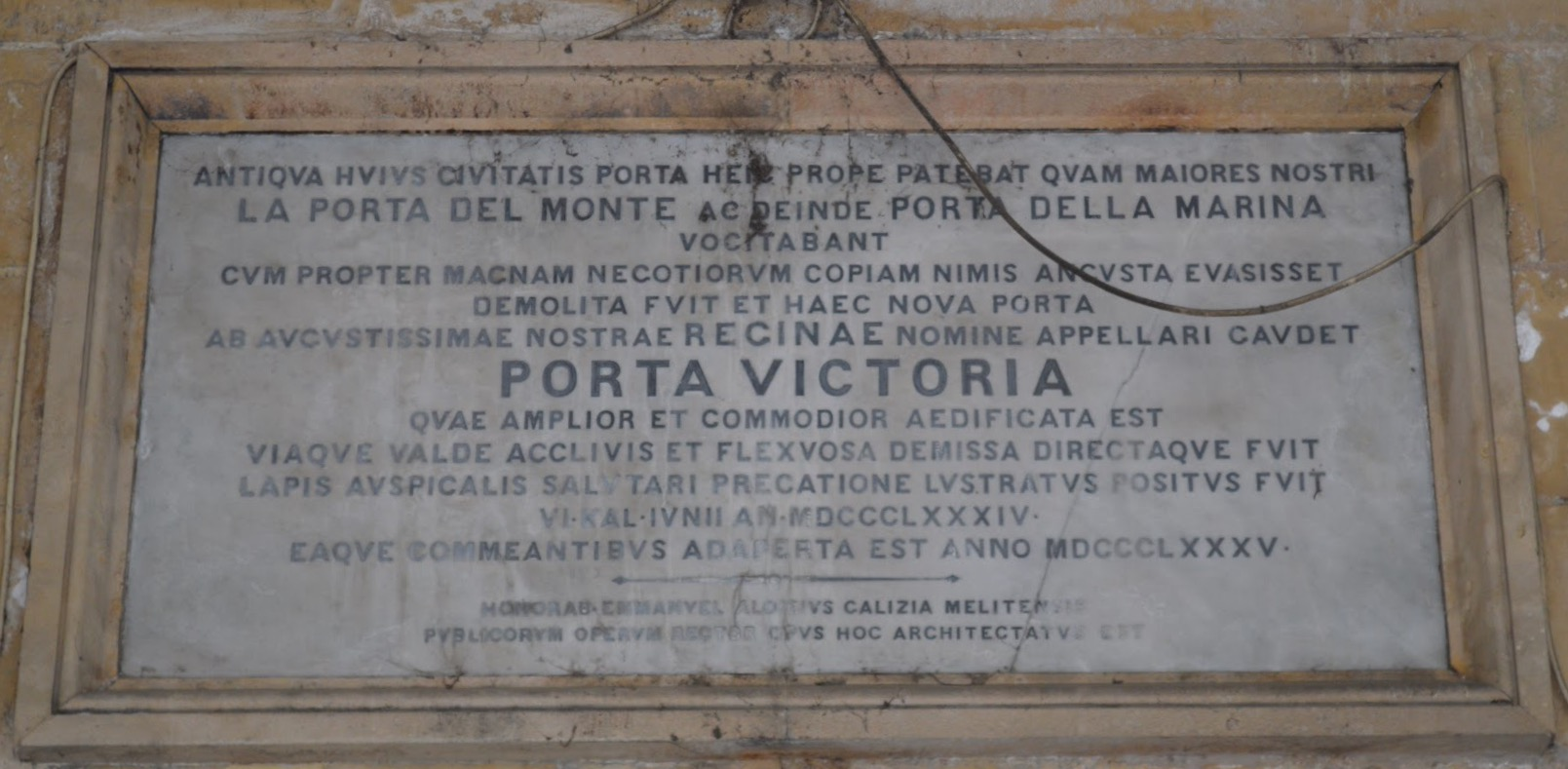
Porta Victoria plaque

By the late 19th century, the Del Monte Gate became too small since the area around it was the busiest part of Valletta. It was demolished in 1884, and replaced by the larger Victoria Gate. The first stone of the new gate was laid down in 1884 by Governor Arthur Borton, and it was completed and opened to the public in 1885. The gate was designed by the Maltese architect Emanuele Luigi Galizia, and it was named after Queen Victoria.

Victoria Gate was extensively restored by the Ministry of Resources and Rural Affairs in 2009 and 2010. Restoration took about six months, and it was directed by the architects Claude Borg and Alexis Inguanez. Throughout the course of restoration, the structure was cleaned, its ditch was rediscovered and restored, its pavements were re-laid, old fixtures were removed and some stonework was repaired.

== Architecture ==
Victoria Gate consists of a double arched opening with an intersecting vault structure intended to allow traffic to pass through, and two small doors on either side to allow passage for pedestrians. The two arches are surmounted by the coats of arms of Malta and Valletta, and the gate is topped by the British coat of arms. The arch is built in Maltese limestone.

The gate originally had a drawbridge and a ditch. The ditch was filled in over the years, but it was uncovered and restored in 2010.

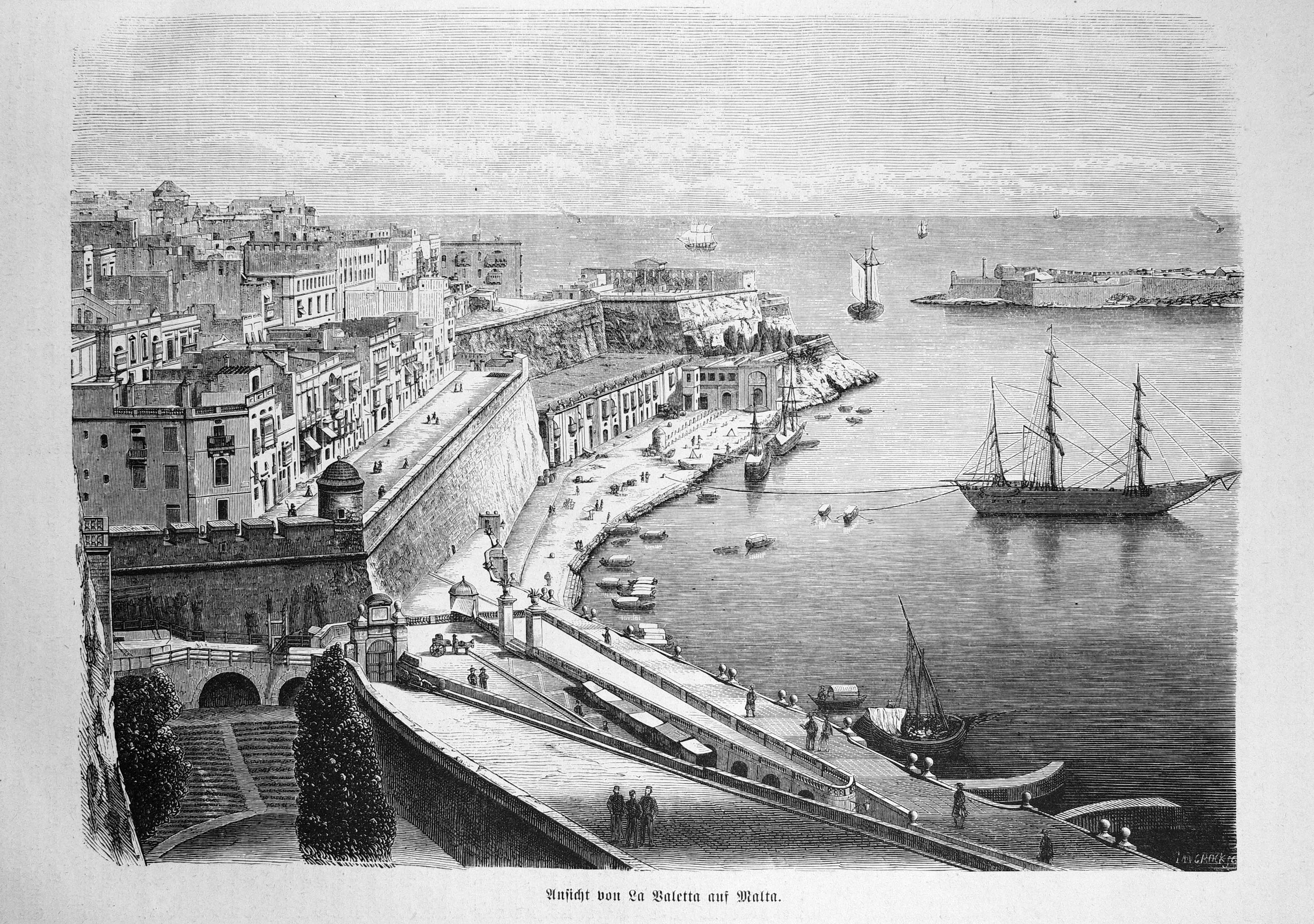
View of Valletta in 1874, prior to the construction of Victoria Gate. Ġnien is-Sultan and the drawbridge of Del Monte Gate can be seen to the lower left.

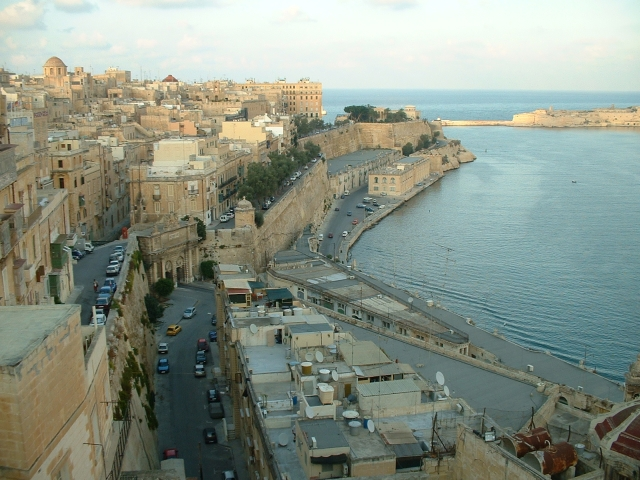
The same view in 2004, with Victoria Gate instead of Del Monte Gate and a road and modern buildings instead of Ġnien is-Sultan
