= St. Barbara Bastion =

Coordinates: 35°53′47″N 14°30′52″E

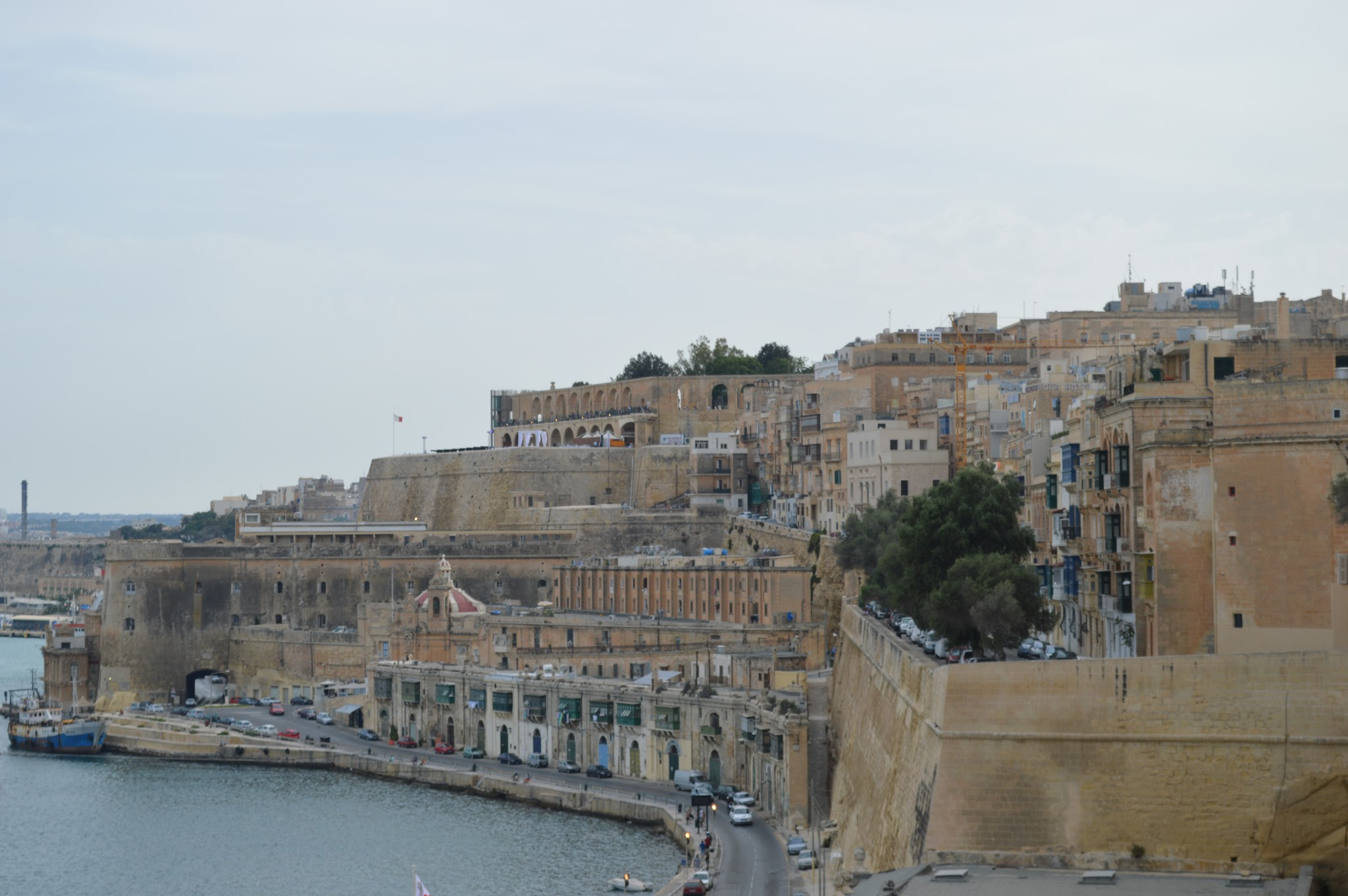
St. Barbara Bastion overlooking Ta' Liesse area

Close to the Valletta Grand Harbour, St. Barbara Bastion is a flat-faced bastion with a low parapet overlooking the Grand Harbour Area, Valletta, Malta.

== History ==
St. Barbara Bastion was built during the 16th Century by the Knights of St. John. These bastions are part of the stone fortifications of Valletta City. Because this part of the bastion was strongly guarded by Fort St. Angelo, situated on the side of the Grand Harbour, St. Barbara bastion was not considered important enough to be assigned to the Knights of the Order of St. John. Instead it was managed by the Association of Bombardiers (Ghaqda tal-Bumbardieri). Since the Association had St. Barbara as their patron saint, it was considered customary to name the Bastion in her honour. St. Barbara's church in Strada Reale, Valletta also bears the same name as it too was managed by the Association of Bombardiers.

== Architecture ==
This fortification with historical and architectural value is listed as part of the National Inventory of the Cultural Property of the Maltese Islands (NICPMI).

St. Barbara street on St. Barbara bastion presents a row of 19th Century Houses overlooking the grand harbour. This area is cited as one of the most sought after addresses in Valletta.

Late 19th Century photos show the Parapet without trees. This area may well have been the first parapet in Valletta to have been decorated with a row of trees.

St. Barbara Street follows the Orthogonal planning of Valletta by Military Engineer Francesco Laparelli, a plan for the city designed to have square street blocks with straight streets intersecting at right angles. After drawing the plans he left the work to his Maltese assistant Gerolamo Cassar. Various stories have cropped up during the years mentioning the existence of a number of pits excavated close to Saint Barbara bastion for the storage of ice, which was brought over from Sicily and used by the Knights at the nearby Sacra Infermeria ( now known as the Mediterranean Conference Centre).

St. Barbara bastions and the areas close to it including Victoria Gate (also known as Porta del Monte) and Ta' Liesse Church underwent various restoration efforts by the Valletta Rehabilitation Project in 2009. Dangerous structures in the church were replaced together with restoration of the dome, belfry and facade. Over 4,000 metres of facade of St. Barbara Bastion was also restored over a period of 15 months.

== Notable sites ==
The Honorary Consulate of Indonesia to Malta is situated here.
