= Lascaris Battery =

Artillery battery in Malta

- Batterija ta' Lascaris
- Part of the fortifications of Valletta
- Valletta, Malta
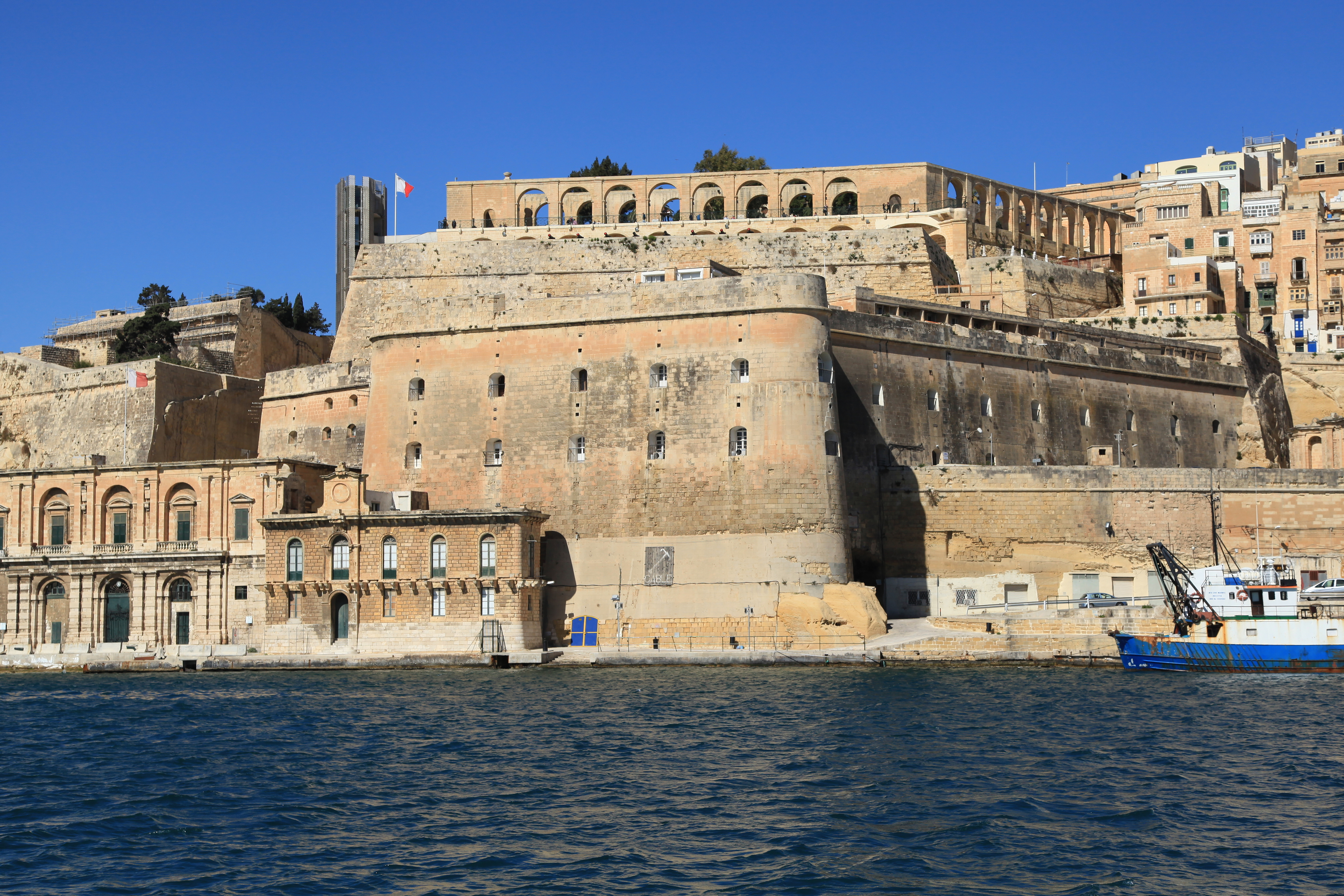
- Lascaris Battery, with the Saluting Battery and the Upper Barrakka Gardens in the background

Site information
- Type: Artillery battery
- Owner: Government of Malta
- Condition: Intact

Location
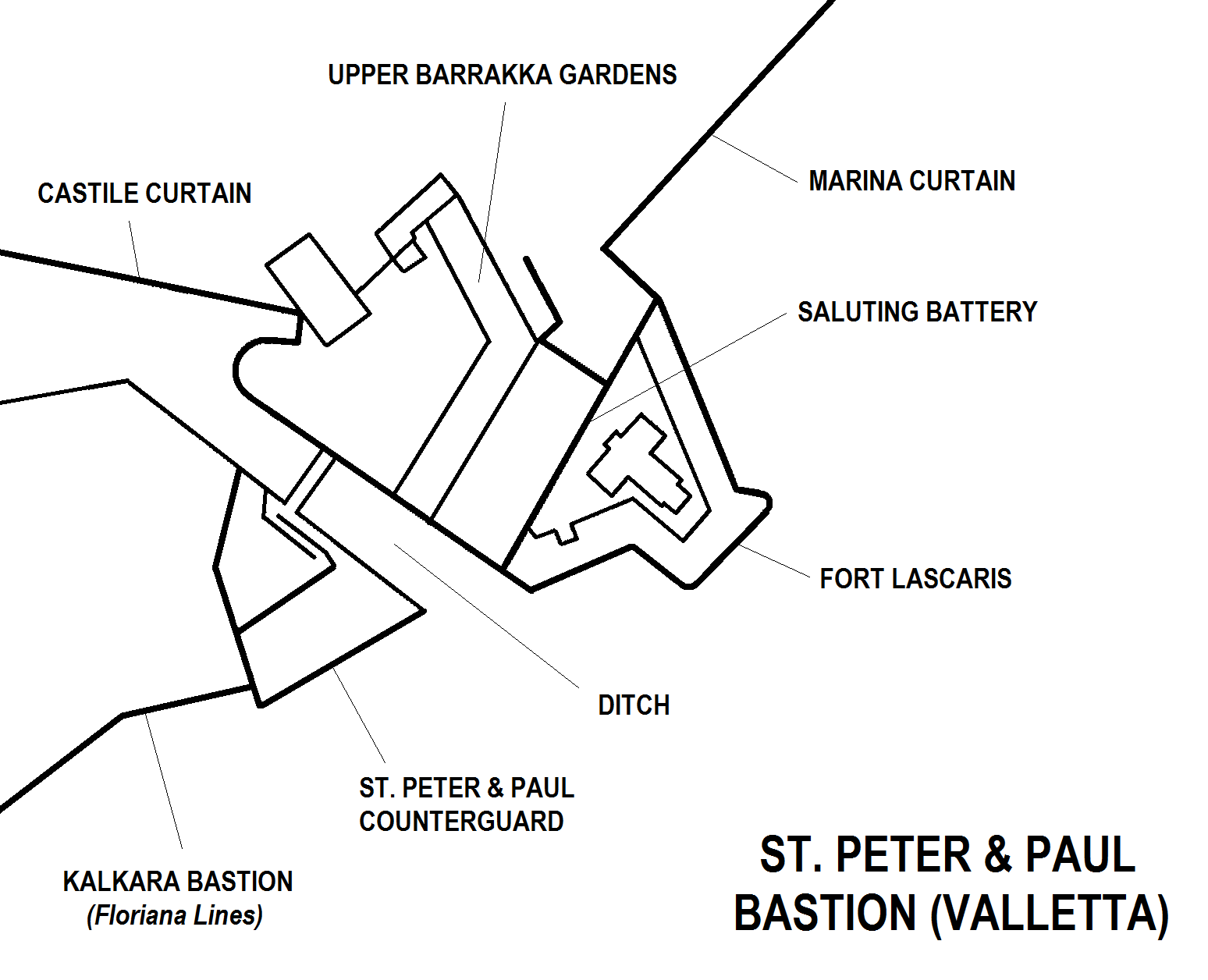
- Map of Lascaris Battery and St. Peter & Paul Bastion
- Coordinates: 35°53′40.16″N 14°30′46.67″E

Site history
- Built: 1854–1856
- Built by: British Empire
- Materials: Limestone
- Battles/wars: World War II

Lascaris Battery (Maltese: Batterija ta' Lascaris), also known as Fort Lascaris (Maltese: Forti Lascaris) or Lascaris Bastion (Maltese: Sur ta' Lascaris), is an artillery battery located on the east side of Valletta, Malta. The battery was built by the British in 1854, and it is connected to the earlier St. Peter & Paul Bastion of the Valletta Land Front. In World War II, the Lascaris War Rooms were dug close to the battery, and they served as Britain's secret headquarters for the defence of the island.

== History ==
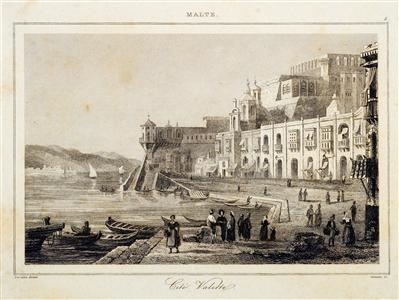
View of the Valletta Marina in 1848, with Ġnien is-Sultan on the site of Lascaris Battery

When the British took over the Maltese islands in 1800, they used the fortifications built by the Order of St. John almost without alterations. Under the military theory of the time, the Royal Navy in the Mediterranean was regarded as the most reliable protection against invasion. However, during his time as governor, Sir William Reid ordered gun batteries to be added inside the Grand Harbour, in order to repel any ships which broke through the cordon of Fort St. Elmo and Fort St. Angelo and penetrated the harbour. Construction of Lascaris Battery began in 1854, on the site of Ġnien is-Sultan, a garden that had been built by Grand Master Giovanni Paolo Lascaris. The battery was thus named after him.

During the Second World War, the Lascaris War Rooms were dug under the Upper Barrakka Gardens and the casemates of the Lascaris Battery, into rock. The network of tunnels and chambers located 150 feet (46 m) below the Upper Barrakka Gardens and the Saluting Battery were used as “The War Rooms” of Britain's War HQ in Malta. The facility later housed the headquarters of the Allied invasion of Sicily during mid-1943.

On 24 December 1941, Lascaris Battery, along with the Upper Barrakka Gardens and the Saluting Battery, were damaged in an air raid. The damaged parts were later rebuilt.

== Features ==
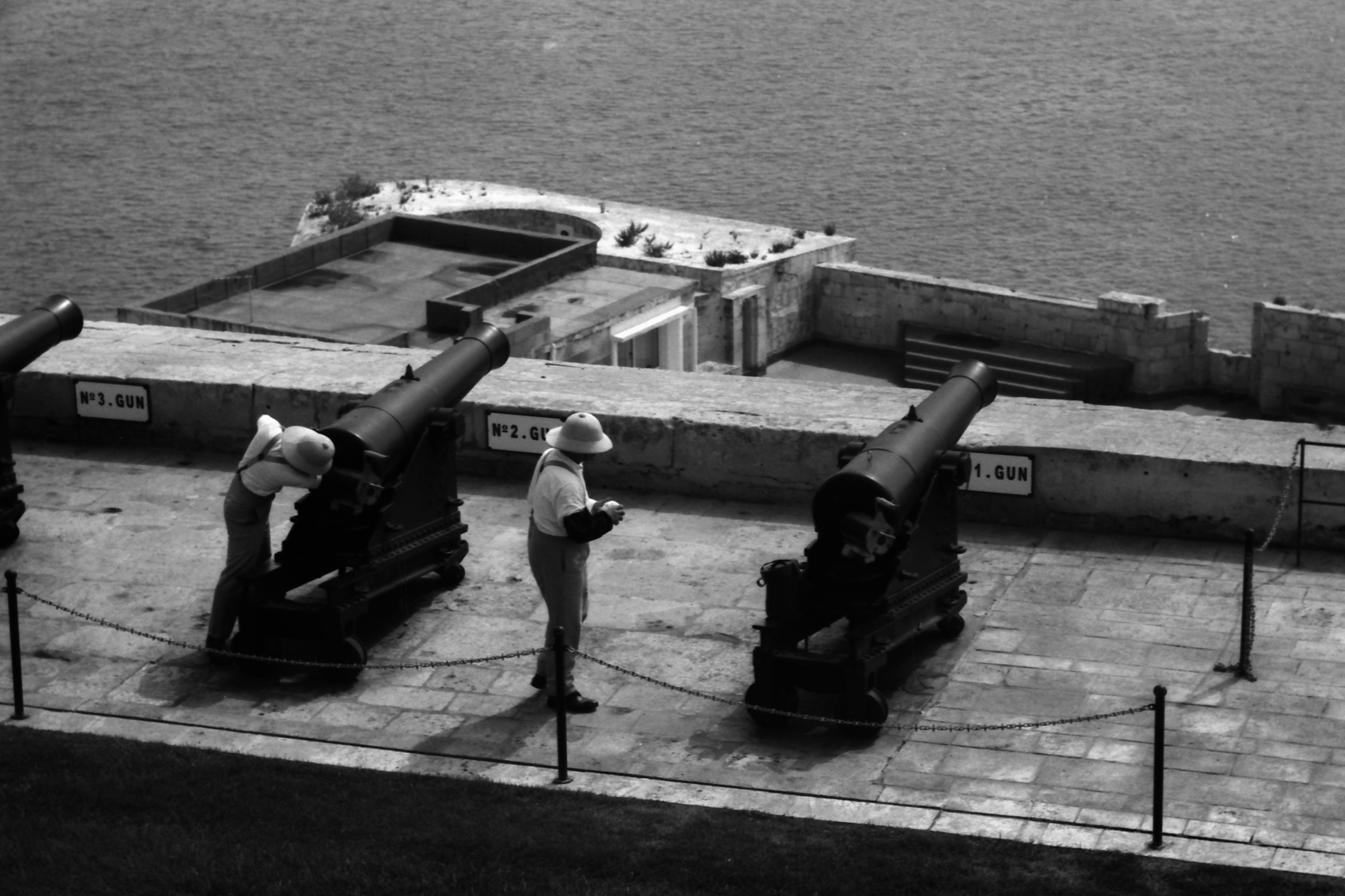
Guns of the Saluting Battery in the foreground, with the RML 9-inch gun emplacement at Lascaris Battery in the background

A high bastion was built on the harbour side of SS Peter and Paul Bastion, below the rectangular Saluting Battery. Lascaris Battery has an irregular trapezoid shape with rounded corners. A shooting platform extends from the right flank. A parade ground was located inside the new bastion. Beginning in 1868, the two-storey casemates were converted to barracks, which, as a result, have open galleries facing the parade ground.

At the beginning of the 1860s, the battery was equipped with fourteen 8-inch 9-ton RML guns. In addition, four 10-inch 18-ton guns were stationed on the left flank of the battery. On an additional platform beneath the left flank of the saluting battery were three 10-inch howitzers. In 1884, the battery was armed with seven 64-pound 64-cwt RML guns in the casemates, which were protected by a wall approximately 1.3 metres (4.3 ft) thick. Since these guns were outmoded, they had to be replaced by more modern artillery. A 9-inch 12-ton RML gun was mounted on the battery on an open barbette in a very exposed situation. The powder store, with a capacity of 30,500 pounds (13,800 kg), was protected only by 3 metres (9.8 ft) walls and roof. Overall, the construction of the battery was outdated and the installation no longer able to defend against modern artillery.

== See also ==
- Lascaris towers, a series of watchtowers built by Grand Master Lascaris in the 17th century
- Lascaris War Rooms, the World War II-era underground complex close to Lascaris Battery
