= Church of Our Lady of Liesse =

- Knisja tal-Madonna ta' Liesse
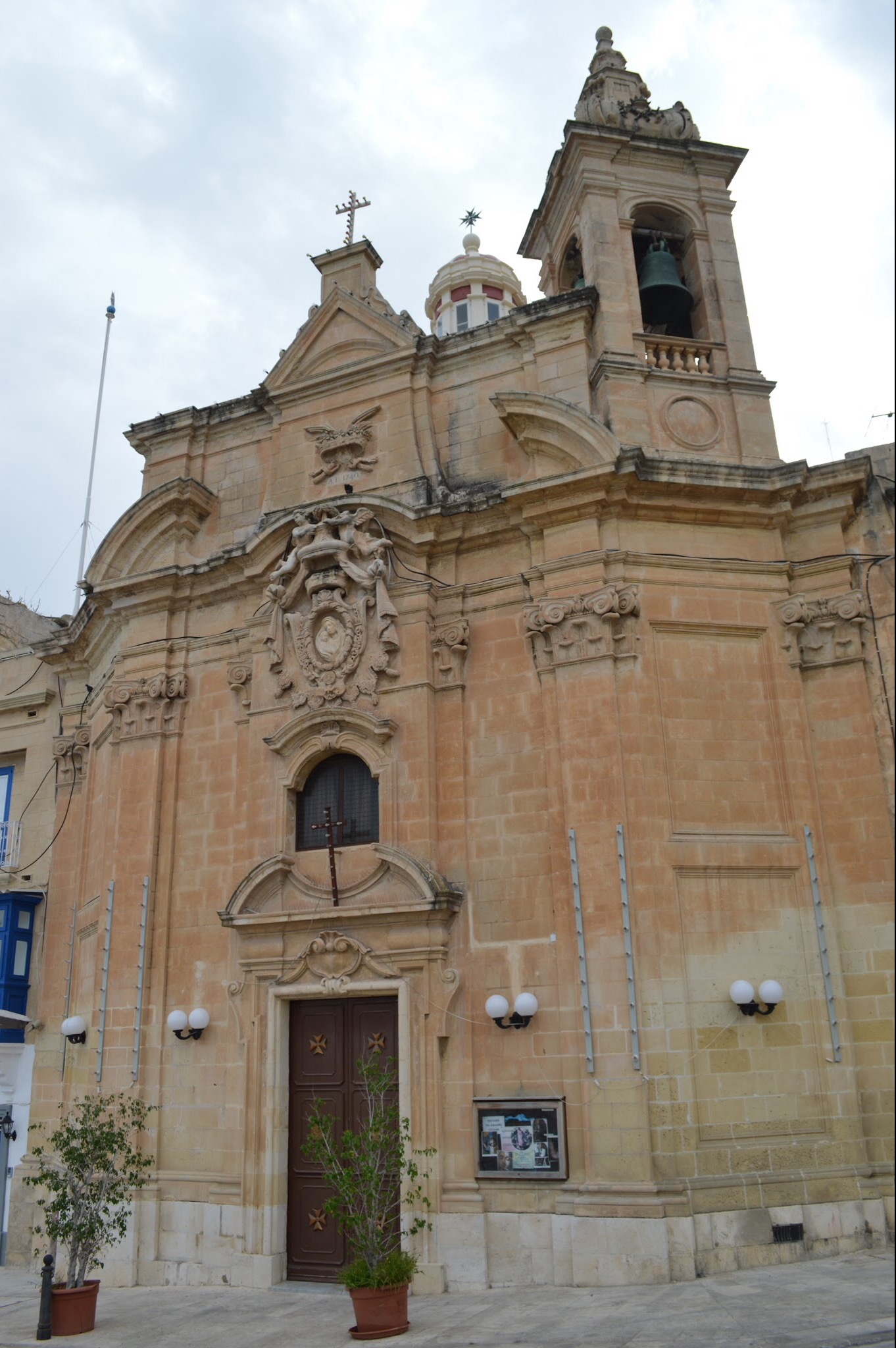
- View of the Church of Our Lady of Liesse

- Church of Our Lady of Liesse
- 35°53′42.3″N 14°30′48.1″E
- Location: Valletta, Malta
- Denomination: Roman Catholic

History
- Founded: 21 November 1620
- Consecrated: 23 November 1806

Architecture
- Architect: Andrea Belli
- Style: Baroque
- Years built: 1620 (original church); 1740 (present church)

Specifications
- Materials: Limestone

The Church of Our Lady of Liesse (Maltese: Knisja tal-Madonna ta' Liesse) is a church in Valletta, Malta. The church was built in 1740 on the site of a 17th-century church. The cupola was built to the design of the Maltese architect Francesco Zammit. The church is located on the waterfront of the Grand Harbour, close to Lascaris Battery and the site of the fish market. It is especially venerated by the people of the port area.

== History ==
The first stone of the Church of Our Lady of Liesse was laid down on 21 November 1620, in a ceremony attended by Grand Master Alof de Wignacourt and many other members of the Order of St. John. The church was built with funds donated by Fra Giacomo De Chess du Bellay, who was the Bailiff of Armenia.

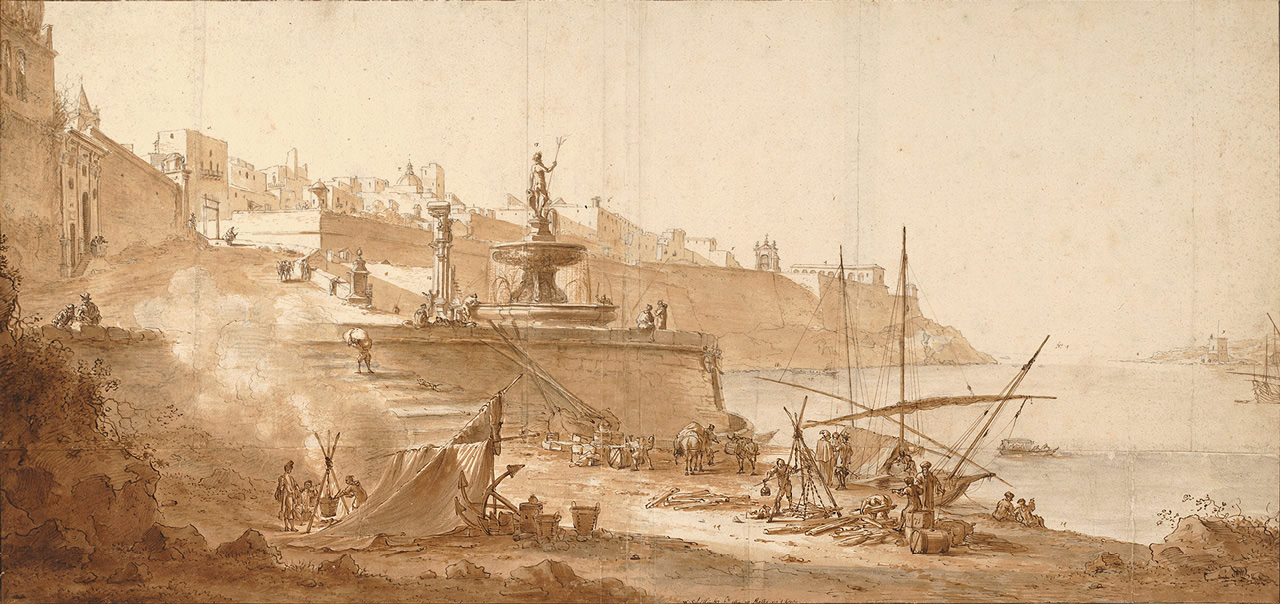
The façade of the first Church of Our Lady of Liesse, seen on the left

The church appears on the side of a 1664 sketch of the Barriera Wharf.

The church was completely rebuilt by the Langue of France in 1740, and was blessed by Bartolomé Rull. The church was consecrated by Bishop Vincenzo Labini on 23 November 1806.

The church was hit by German aerial bombardment in 1942 during World War II, but it was repaired and reopened on 21 February 1952. It was given to the Apostleship of the Sea on 15 September 1961.

== The church ==
The church is built in the Baroque style. It has a dome and a belfry which was designed by Francesco Zammit. It has three altars.

The titular painting of the church, by Enrico Arnaux, depicts a legend about three knights and Our Lady of Liesse. The relics of the martyr St. Generoso are stored in the church, and they were transferred there from the chapel of Fort Manoel. A statue of the Virgin Mary which had originally been located at Fort Saint Elmo is now found in a niche in the church.

The church building is a Grade 1 national monument, and it is listed on the National Inventory of the Cultural Property of the Maltese Islands.

== Gallery ==
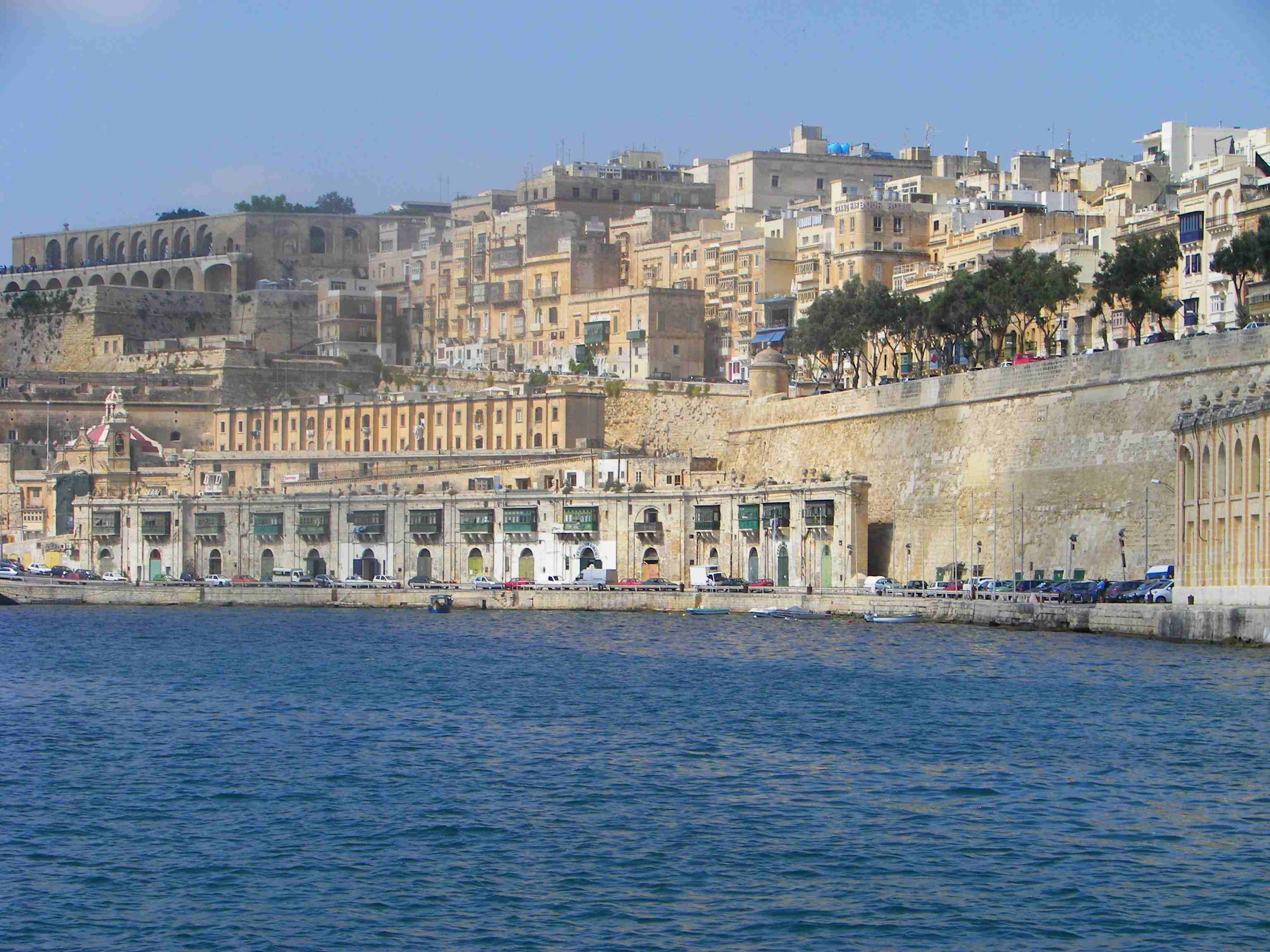
View of the church in Valletta

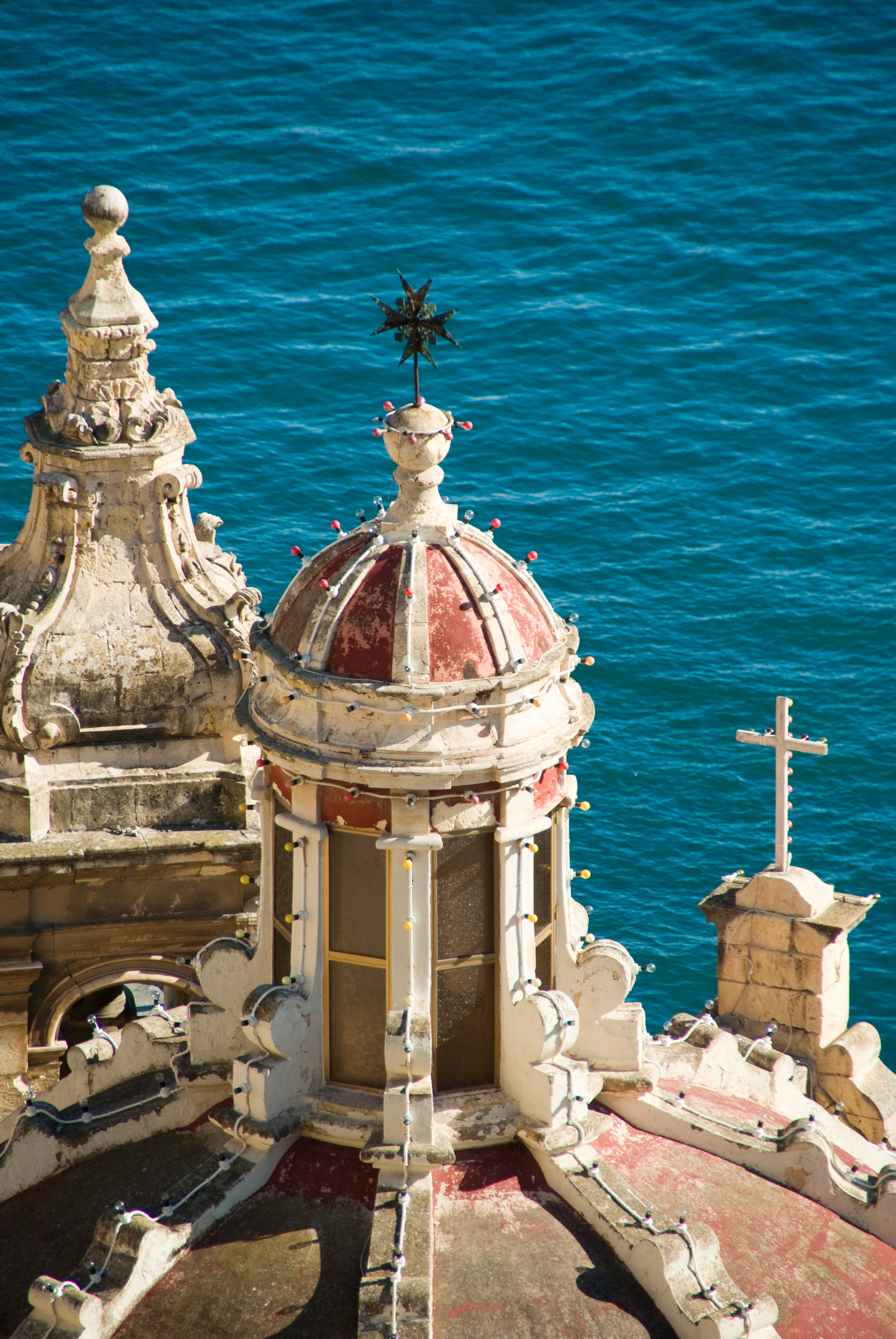
Aerial view of the church

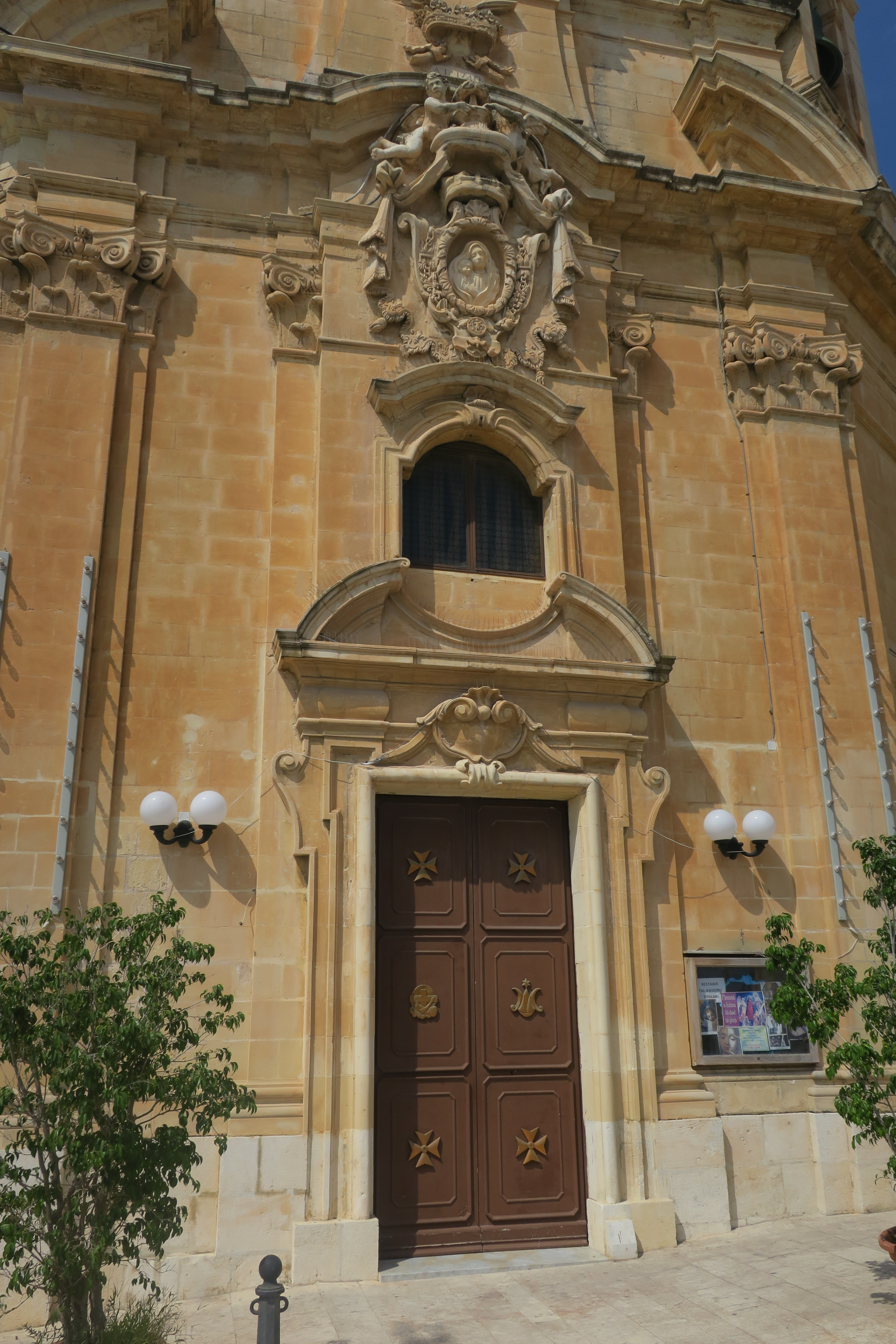
Exterior view

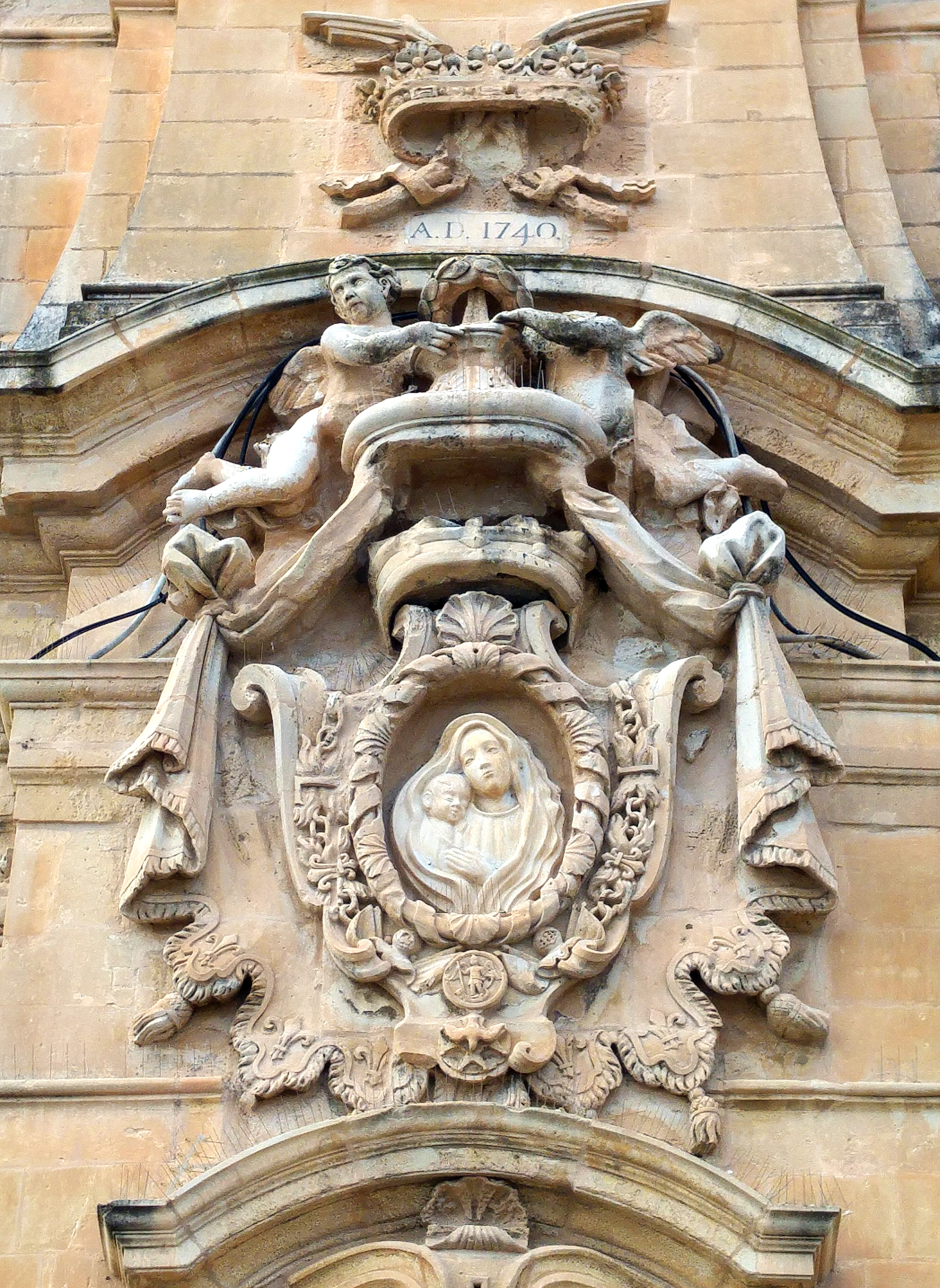
Architectural detail
