= Morshead =

Morshead is a surname. Notable people with the surname include:

- Catherine Morshead, British television director
- E. D. A. Morshead (1849–1912), English classicist and teacher
- Henry Anderson Morshead (c. 1774–1831), Irish British Army officer
- Henry Morshead (1882–1931), English surveyor, explorer and mountaineer
- Leslie Morshead (1889–1959), Australian soldier, teacher, businessman, and farmer
- Owen Morshead (1893–1977), British Army officer and Royal Librarian
- Sam Morshead (1955–2018), Irish jockey

== See also ==
- Moorehead, surname
- Morshead baronets, title in the Baronetage of Great Britain.
