= Dingli Radar =

Maltese radar installation

Coordinates: 35.8523°N 14.3817°E

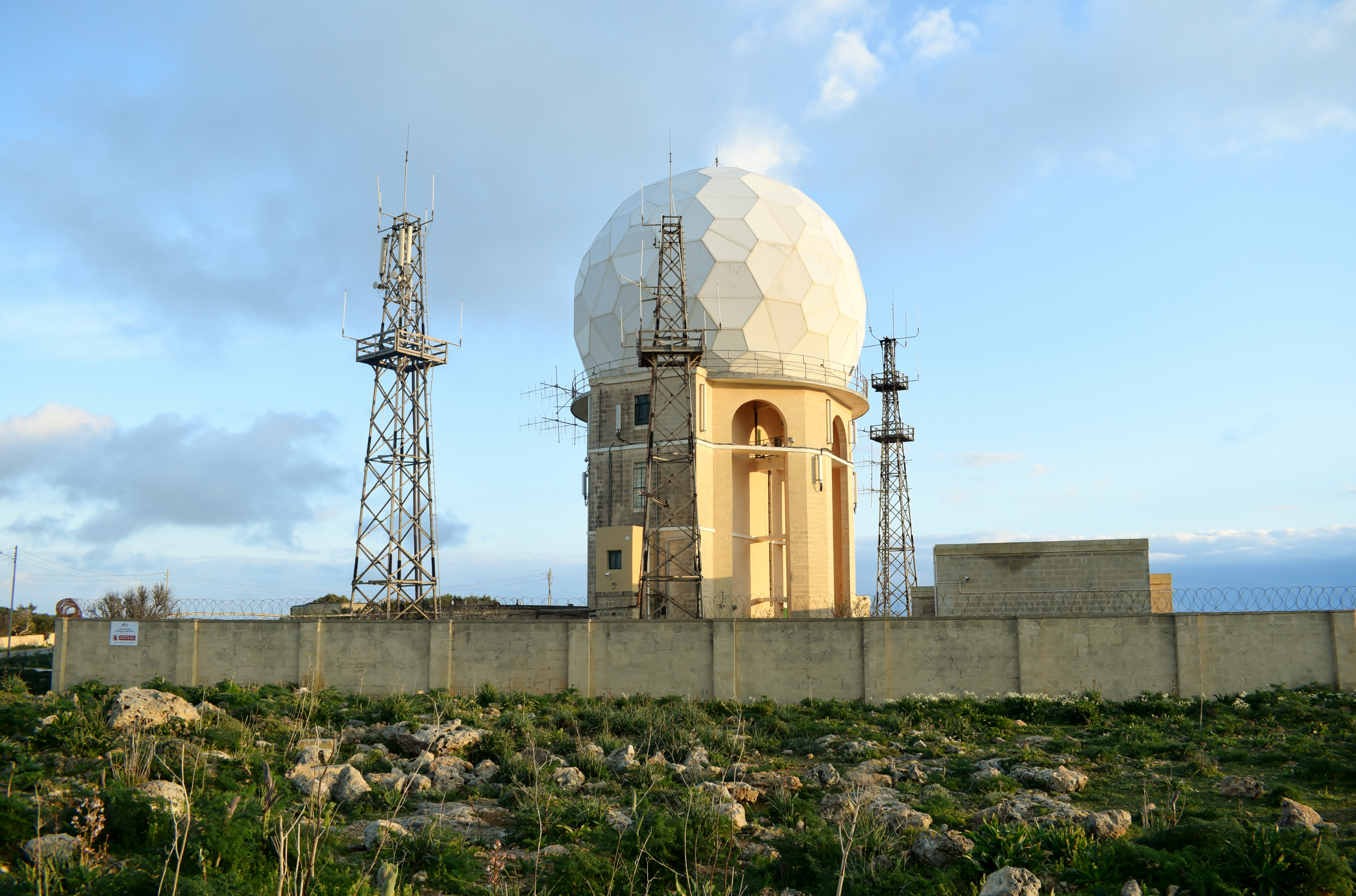
It is totally forbidden to enter the region behind the barrier. There is a warning notice on the fence for those with pacemakers and similar devices, because the radar antenna emits intense electromagnetic and non-ionizing radiation.

The Dingli Radar is a large radar installation located in the Dingli area of Malta. It is used to monitor air traffic in the Maltese airspace and is operated by the Maltese Air Traffic Control. The radar is a key component of the country's air traffic management system, and it plays a critical role in ensuring aviation safety in the region.

== History ==
The first radar station in the Maltese Islands, the Dingli Radar, was established at Dingli Cliffs on March 27, 1939. Its function was to find nearby airplanes. The British also constructed and made use of an underground complex during World War II. The system established a triangulation network that connected Dingli Cliffs to Tas-Silġ and Wardija, and it sent the data it had collected there for additional analysis to the Lascaris War Rooms in Valletta. The plotters used the intelligence to mark the locations of enemy aircraft on a map so that RAF fighters could intercept them. The British also installed a radio telegraphy cabin among other things. After the Maltese took over control of the air traffic systems from the British forces in 1979, the development of today's radar installation began in 1984, and the new Dingli Radar station was in use by 1986. The Technical Station, run by Malta Air Traffic Services Limited, now handles all of the Radar's technical requirements. It manages all air traffic from Tunisia to Crete that passes through Malta's Flight Information Area.

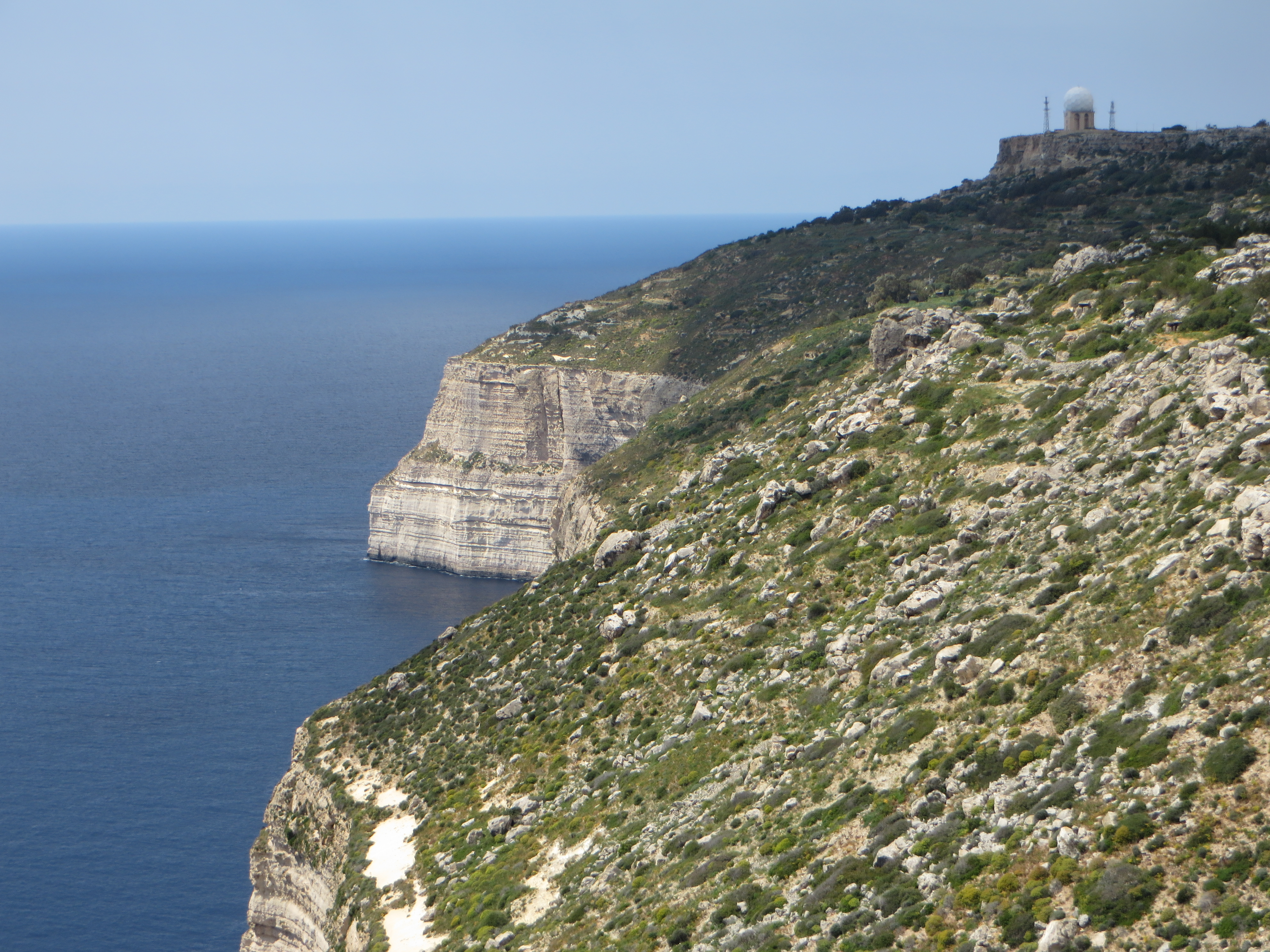
Dingli Cliffs with the radar installation in the top right
