= General FitzClarence =

General FitzClarence may refer to:

- Charles FitzClarence (1865–1914), British Army brigadier general
- Lord Frederick FitzClarence (1799–1854), British Army lieutenant general
- George FitzClarence, 1st Earl of Munster (1794–1842), British Army major general
