= SBBL 32-pounder =

Ordnance SBBL 32-pounder gun
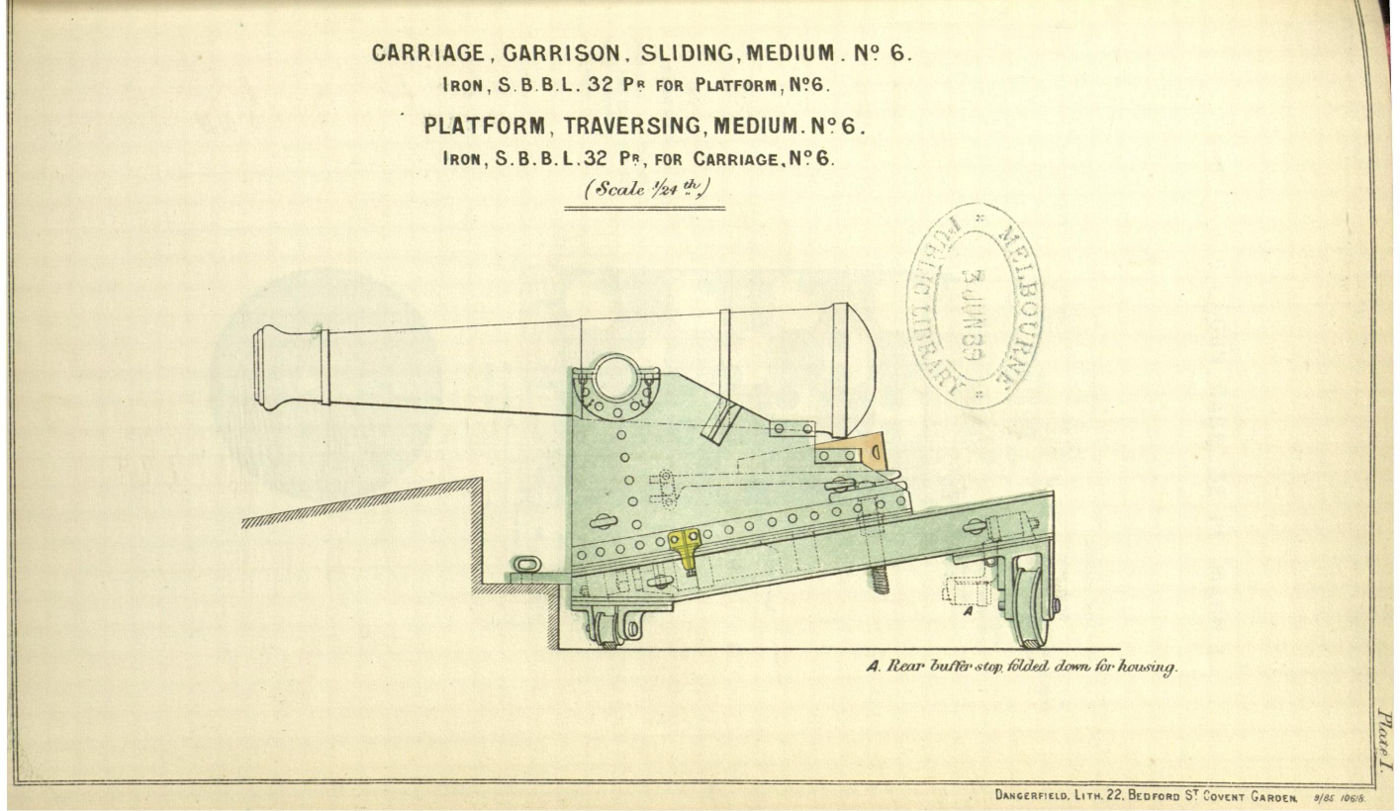
- Diagram, SBBL 32-pounder gun on medium sliding garrison carriage no. 6
- Type: Flank defence gun Saluting gun Time gun
- Place of origin: United Kingdom

Service history
- In service: 1882–1927
- Used by: Army

Production history
- Designer: Royal Gun Factory
- Designed: 1880
- Manufacturer: Royal Arsenal
- Variants: Mk I only

Specifications
- Barrel length: 86 inches (2.2 m) (bore)
- Shell: 55 pounds (24.95 kg) Case shot Mk I
- Calibre: 6.3-inch (160.0 mm)
- Maximum firing range: Mk I : 400 yards (370 m)
- Sights: Centre sight only

The SBBL 32-pounder was a British smooth-bore breech loading gun made by converting older 32-pounder 42 cwt smooth-bore muzzle-loading guns.

== Design and role ==
The guns chosen for conversion were Monk Pattern guns of 42 cwt, a lighter and shorter variant of muzzle loader. The cascabel of the gun was cut off and a double action breech block was fitted. A new vent was drilled in front of the breech mechanism, as the guns were designed to be fired with short friction tubes, the standard means of ignition for artillery pieces at the time.

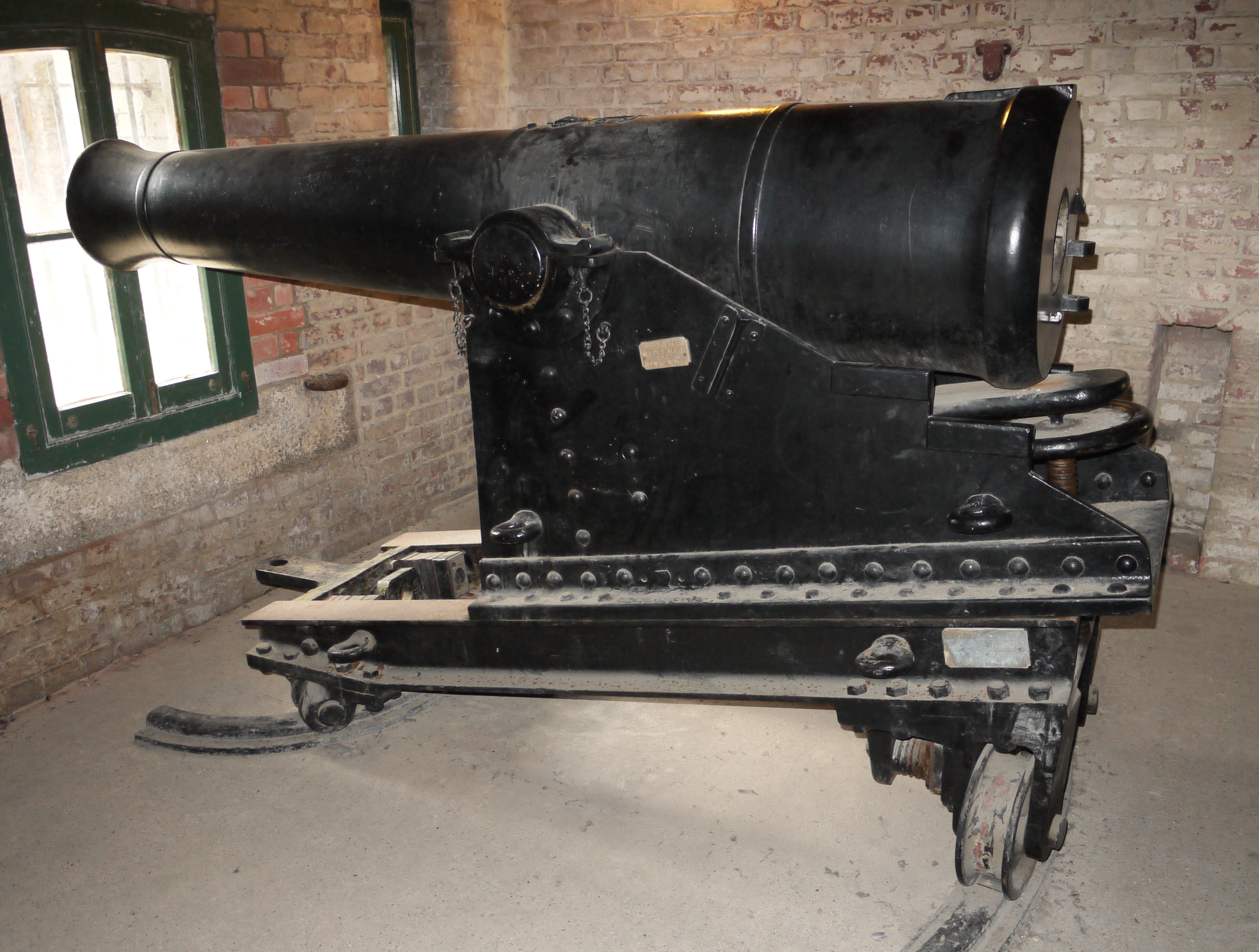
A SBBL 32-pounder in a caponier at Fort Nelson

The conversion was first suggested in 1879 to enable guns fitted in the flank defence of fortifications to be fired much more rapidly. They were used in caponiers to provide flanking fire to fortifications. In this role their targets would have been personnel entering ditches, and the guns were designed to fire case shot only, with ranges of up to about 500 yards. Because of the nature of the conversion, and the type of ammunition, a service charge of 3lb of black powder was used, as opposed to around three times that amount for a conventional 32-pounder muzzle loading gun.

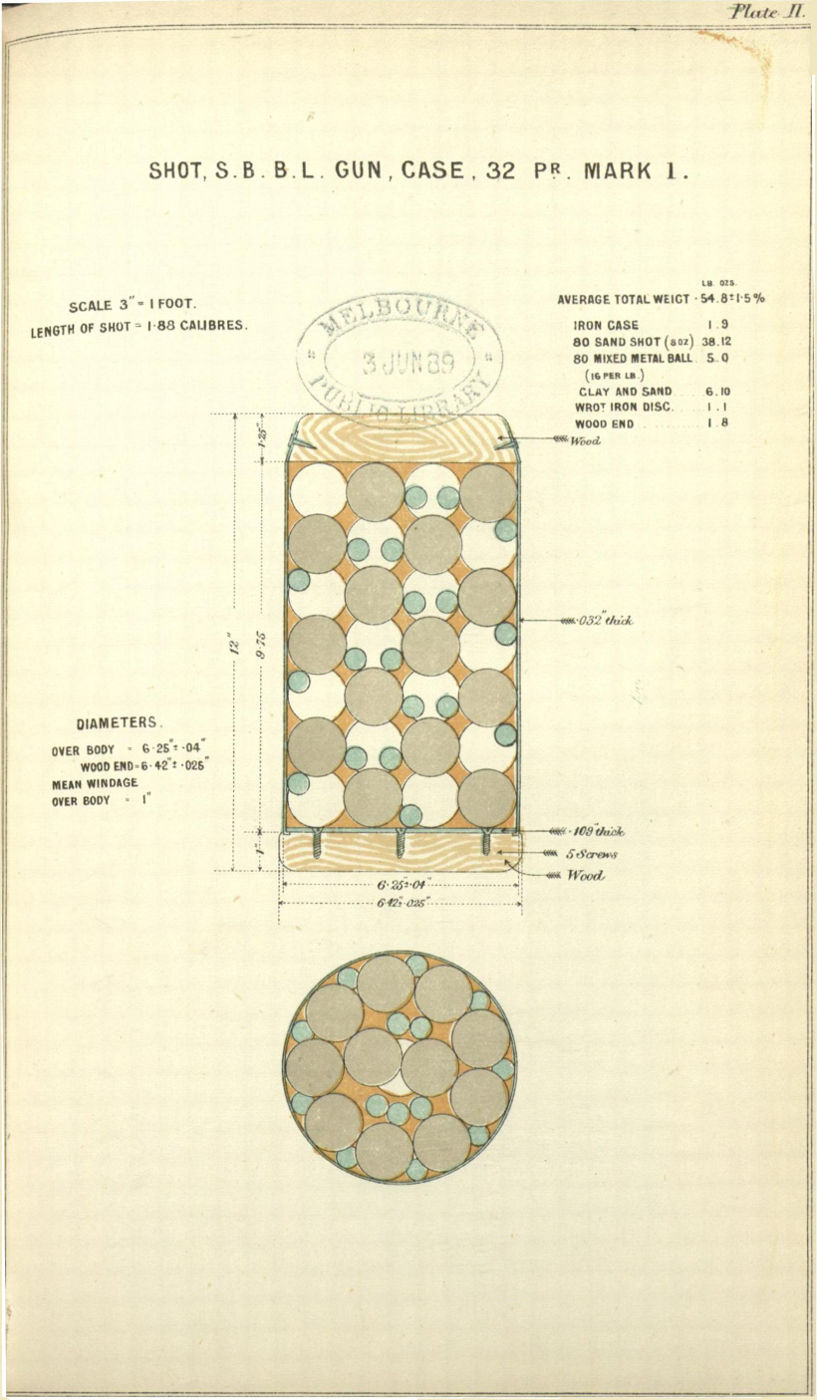
Case shot for 32 Pr SBBL

The guns were only ever mounted on one type of carriage. It was an iron sliding carriage and platform, which enabled the gun to be traversed left and right, as well as run back for storage. The slide also acted to absorb recoil from the gun when it was fired. An elevating screw and wooden elevating wedge (or Quoin) was also provided, to enable the gun to be elevated or depressed.

They were originally assigned a crew of six, but this was later reduced to four. Since the role of flank defence was considered to be of limited importance there was considerable delay in mounting the guns. They were only ever designed to fire case shot, because of the limited field of fire they were given in fortifications.

== Later use and surviving examples ==
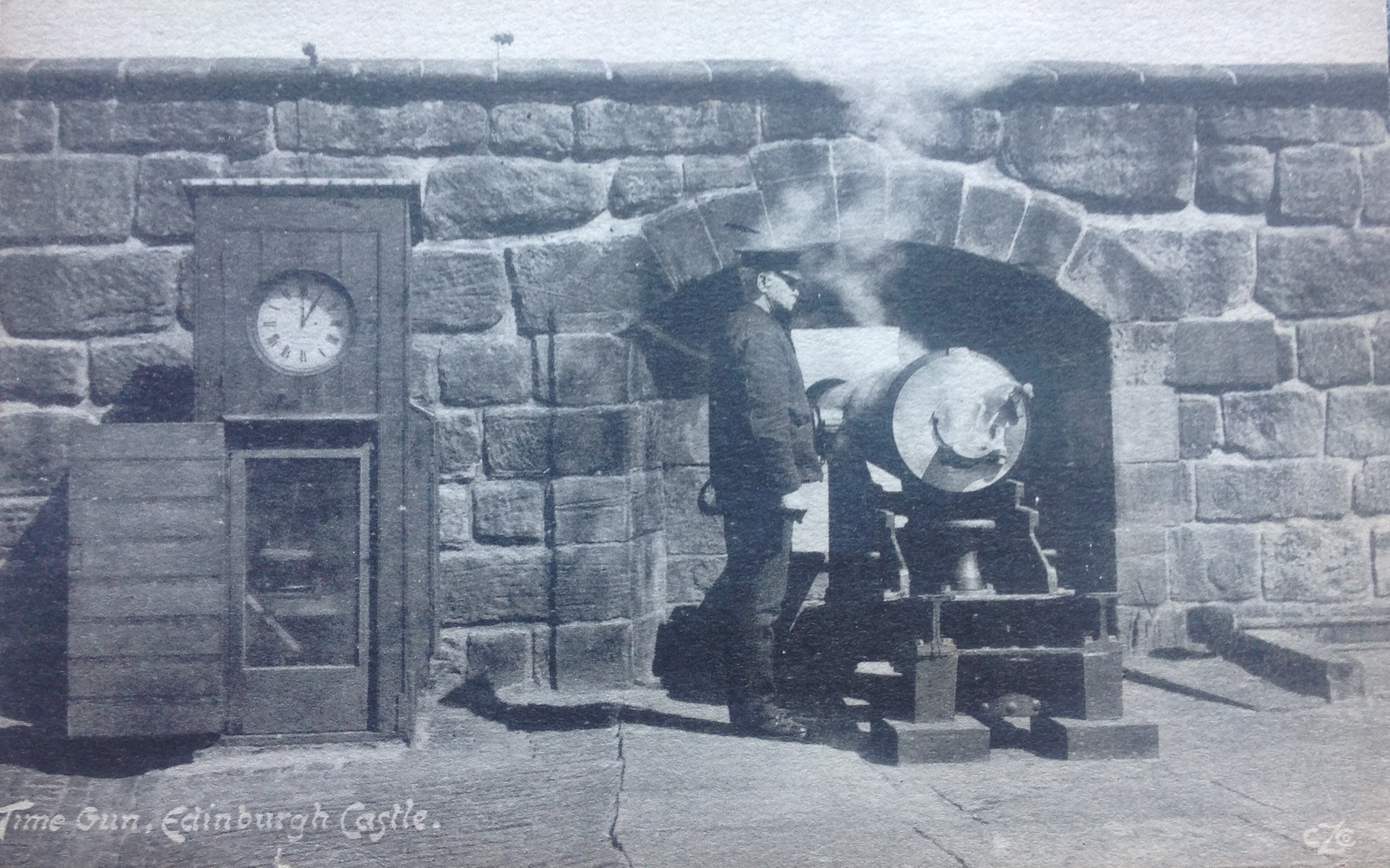
32-pounder SBBL in use as a time gun at Edinburgh Castle, c. 1910

In the flank defence role the guns were quickly superseded with the introduction of the machine gun and were declared obsolete in that role in 1907. Rather than being completely scrapped, many SBBL 32-pounders were later used in a saluting role; One gun was also used at Edinburgh Castle to fire the One O'Clock gun up until the First World War.

Seven examples of the guns survive in the United Kingdom in the collection of the Royal Armouries. Four of them are mounted in original positions at Fort Nelson, Hampshire.

The Saluting Battery in Valletta, Malta was equipped with SBBL 32-pounders from 1906 to 1927. In 2011 eight working replicas were installed in the battery when it was being restored. The guns are now fired twice every day.

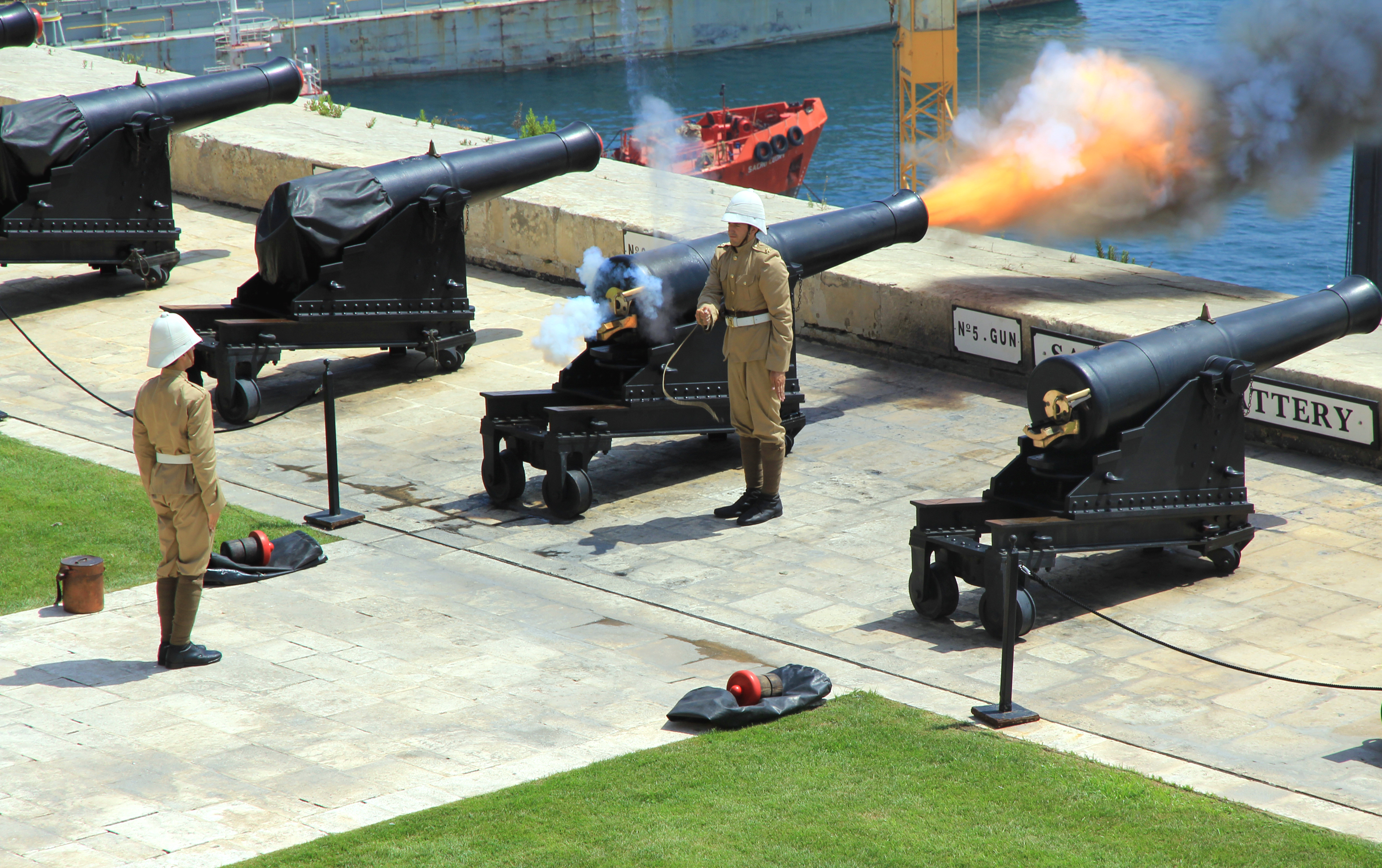
A replica of a SBBL 32-pounder being fired at the Saluting Battery, Valletta, Malta.
