= George Leslie, 15th Earl of Rothes =

George William Evelyn Leslie, 15th Earl of Rothes (8 November 1809 – 10 March 1841) was the son of Henrietta Leslie, 14th Countess of Rothes and George Gwyther (who assumed the surname Leslie). He was christened on 14 December at Saint Mary-St Marylebone Road, St Marylebone, London, England.

Leslie succeeded his mother Henrietta Anne, to the title Earl of Rothes, in 1819.

On 7 May 1831, he married Louisa Susannah Jane Anderson Morshead, daughter of Henry Anderson Morshead, and they had issue:

- Henrietta Anderson Morshead Leslie, 17th Countess of Rothes (1832–1886)
- George William Evelyn Leslie, 16th Earl of Rothes (1835–1859)

Masonic offices
Preceded by James Forrest	Grand Master of the Grand Lodge of Scotland; 1840–1841	Succeeded by Lord Frederick FitzClarence
Peerage of Scotland
Preceded by Henrietta Leslie	Earl of Rothes; 1741–1742	Succeeded by George Leslie
