= Saluting Battery (Valletta) =

Artillery battery in Valletta, Malta

- Batterija tas-Salut
- Part of the fortifications of Valletta
- Valletta, Malta
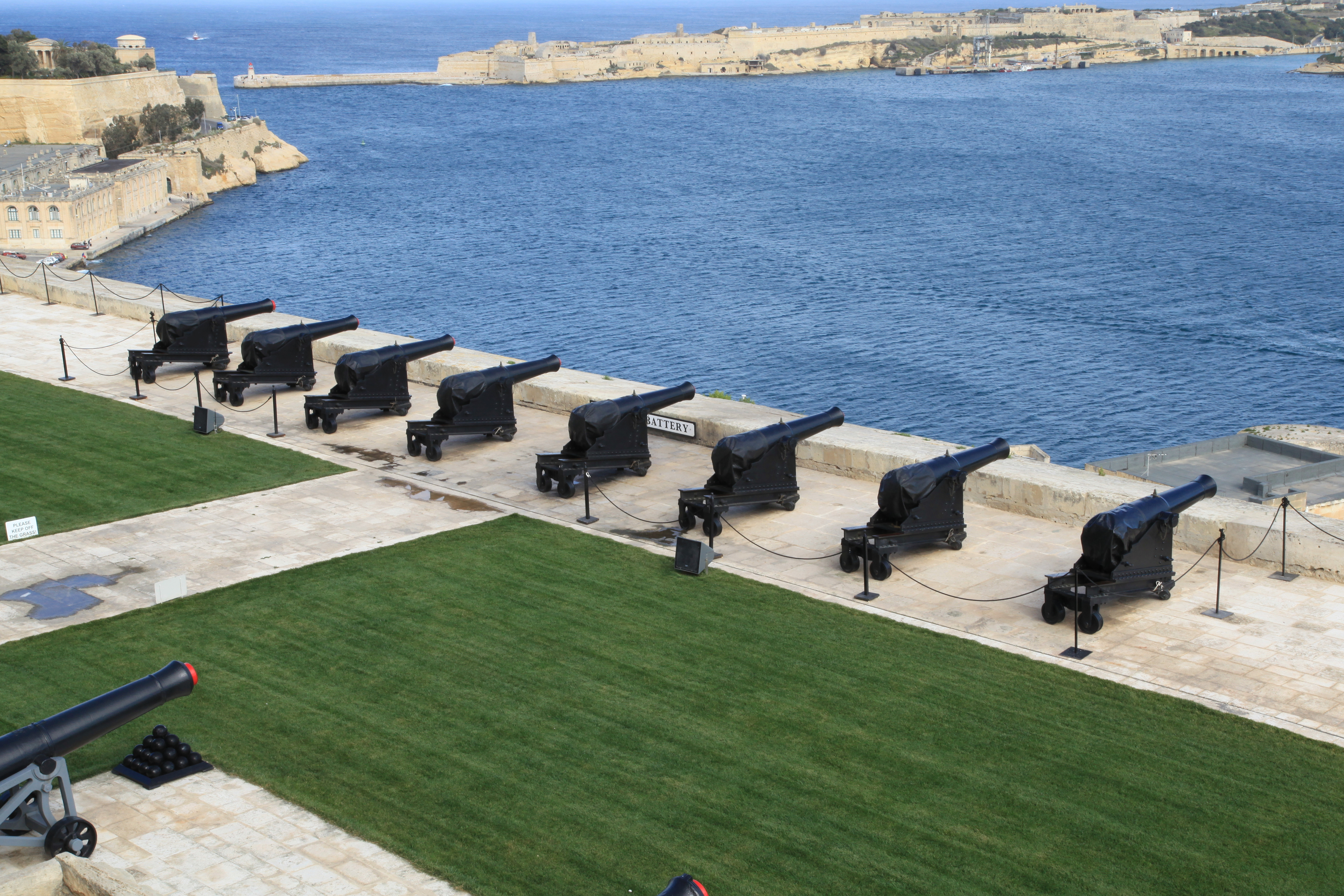
- The Saluting Battery as seen from the Upper Barrakka Gardens in 2013

- Logo of the Saluting Battery

Site information
- Type: Artillery battery
- Owner: Government of Malta
- Operator: Fondazzjoni Wirt Artna
- Open to the public: Yes
- Condition: Intact
- Website: www.salutingbattery.com

Location
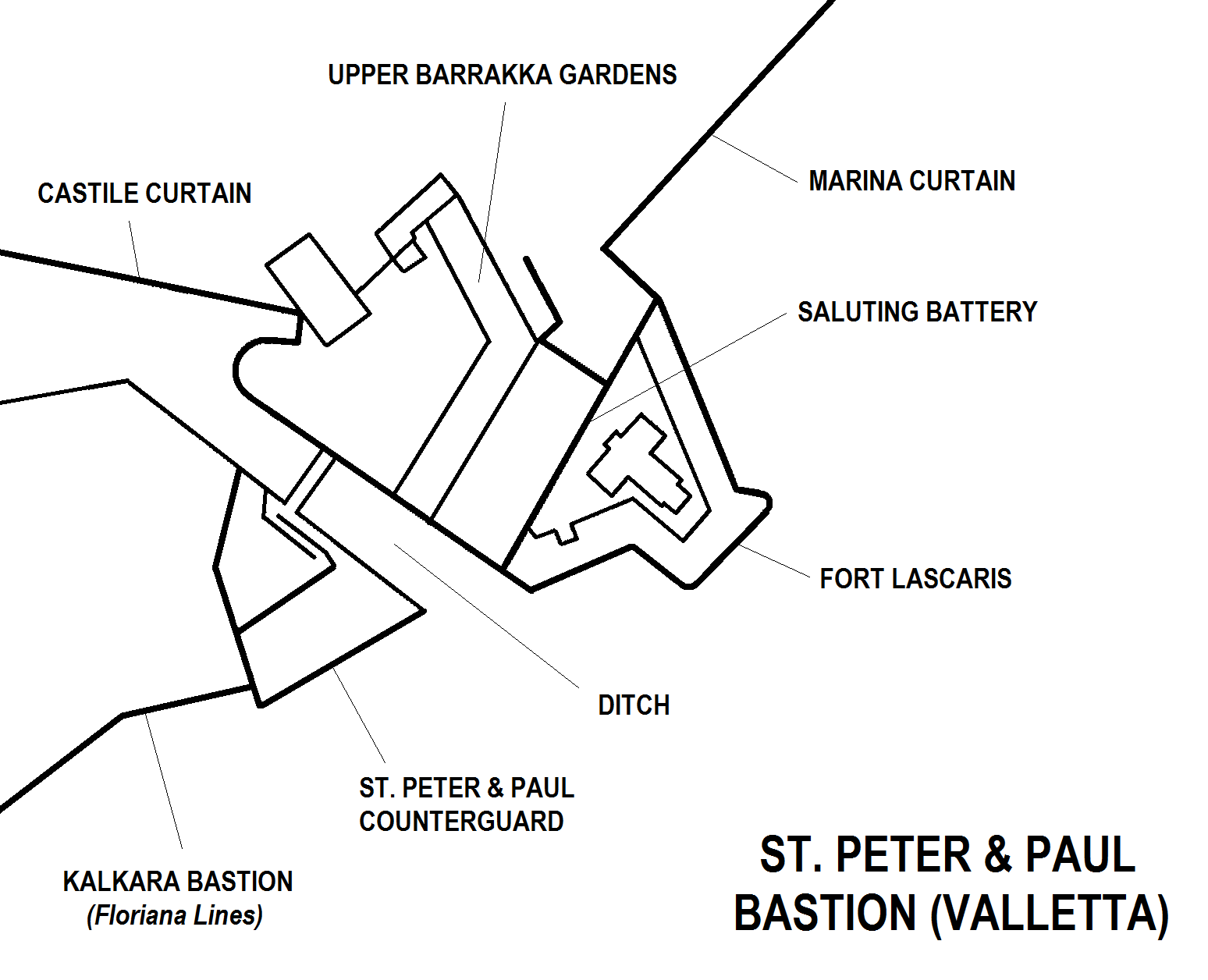
- Map of the Saluting Battery within St. Peter & Paul Bastion
- Coordinates: 35°53′40.61″N 14°30′44.89″E

Site history
- Built: 1560s
- Built by: Order of Saint John; British Empire
- In use: 1560s–1954
- Materials: Limestone
- Battles/wars: Siege of Malta (1798–1800); World War II

The Saluting Battery (Maltese: Batterija tas-Salut) is an artillery battery in Valletta, Malta. It was constructed in the 16th century by the Order of Saint John, on or near the site of an Ottoman battery from the Great Siege of Malta. The battery forms the lower tier of St. Peter & Paul Bastion of the Valletta Land Front, located below the Upper Barrakka Gardens and overlooking Fort St. Angelo and the rest of the Grand Harbour.

The Saluting Battery was mainly used for firing ceremonial and signal gun salutes. In the past, these firings announced the opening and closure of the city gates, and marked time for the chronometers on passing ships. It also saw military use during the blockade of 1798–1800 and World War II, with an anti-aircraft position. The battery remained an active military installation until its guns were removed by the British in 1954. It was restored and opened to the public in the early 21st century, and it is now equipped with eight working replicas of SBBL 32-pounders which fire gun signals daily, Mon - Sat, at 1200 and 1600.

== History ==
=== Hospitaller rule ===
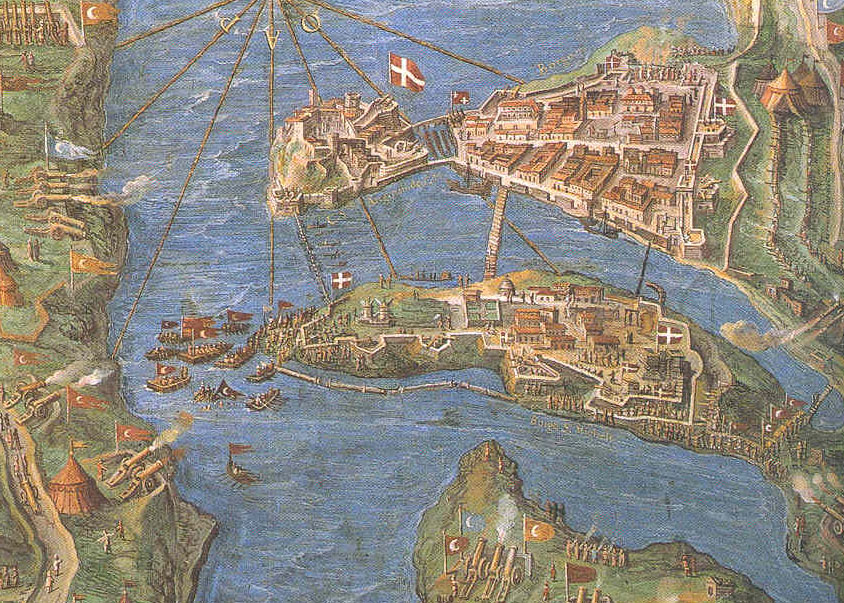
Detail from a map of the Grand Harbour during the Great Siege of Malta in 1565, showing the Order's strongholds of Birgu and Senglea and various Ottoman batteries. The battery at the top left of the image, overlooking Fort St. Angelo and flying a blue standard, stood roughly on the site of the Saluting Battery.

The origins of the Saluting Battery go back to the Great Siege of Malta in 1565. During the siege, Ottoman forces mounted cannon on the Sciberras Peninsula (now occupied by Valletta and Floriana) to bombard the Order of Saint John in Fort St. Angelo. One of the siege batteries was located close to where the Saluting Battery is now, since the area is on high ground and has clear views of St. Angelo and the rest of the Grand Harbour.

In 1566, after the siege was lifted, the city of Valletta was founded. St. Peter & Paul Bastion began to be built in the same year, and was finished in 1570. The bastion has a multi-tiered artillery platform, from which guns could be mounted to command the full length and depth of the Grand Harbour. The Saluting Battery was built on the lower platform, while a loggia and a private garden were built on the upper part in the early 17th century. During the order's rule in Malta, the battery was used for both military and ceremonial purposes. By the late 18th century, the battery was armed with sixteen 12-pounder bronze cannon that fired stone spherical shots.

During the French occupation of Malta and the siege of Valletta by Maltese insurgents, the armament of the Saluting Battery remained unchanged, but the guns' elevations were increased to be able to bombard insurgent positions on Corradino Heights across the harbour.

=== British rule ===
Soon after the British occupied Malta in 1800, the three daily gun signals (at sunrise, noon and sunset) began to be fired from the Saluting Battery instead of Saint James Cavalier, as they had been during the order's rule. When the battery was undergoing maintenance, the shots were fired from Fort St Angelo on the opposite side of the harbour. In 1803, two 24-pounder carronades and some 24-pounder cannon, which had been captured from the French during the French Revolutionary Wars, were added to the armament of the battery, and these remained in place until 1825.

In 1824, the loggia and garden on the platform above the Saluting Battery were opened to the public as the Upper Barrakka Gardens. By 1848, the battery was armed with four 12-pounder guns. Over the next few years, the armament was significantly increased. By 1852, the battery was armed with ten 24-pounders on the main parapet, four 32-pounders on the right flank, three 8-inch howitzers on the left flank, two 13-inch mortars at the back of the parapet, and two 56-pounder carronades at the salient angles. In 1854, Lascaris Battery was built adjoining St. Peter & Paul Bastion, below the Saluting Battery. Henry Anderson Morshead (died 1831) was buried on the site of the battery.

In the 1860s, another 24-pounder was added, bringing the salute guns to eleven. In 1886, howitzers were replaced by RML 64-pounder guns, while the 32-pounders were removed. In the 1890s, all the armament was replaced with eleven 32-pounder Muzzle Loaders, which were used for saluting purposes only. In the early 20th century, the armament consisted of eight SBBL 32 pounders. The gun signals were not fired throughout World War I to conserve gunpowder, and they began to be fired again on Armistice Day in 1918.

During the 1920s, the civilian authorities began pressing the government to cede the Saluting Battery in order to extend the Upper Barrakka. A second entrance to the battery was opened in 1924, linking it to the gardens. That same year, the armament was reduced to one SBBL 32-pounder, and four Ordnance QF 18-pounders. Part of the battery was given up to the public, and the guns were fenced off.

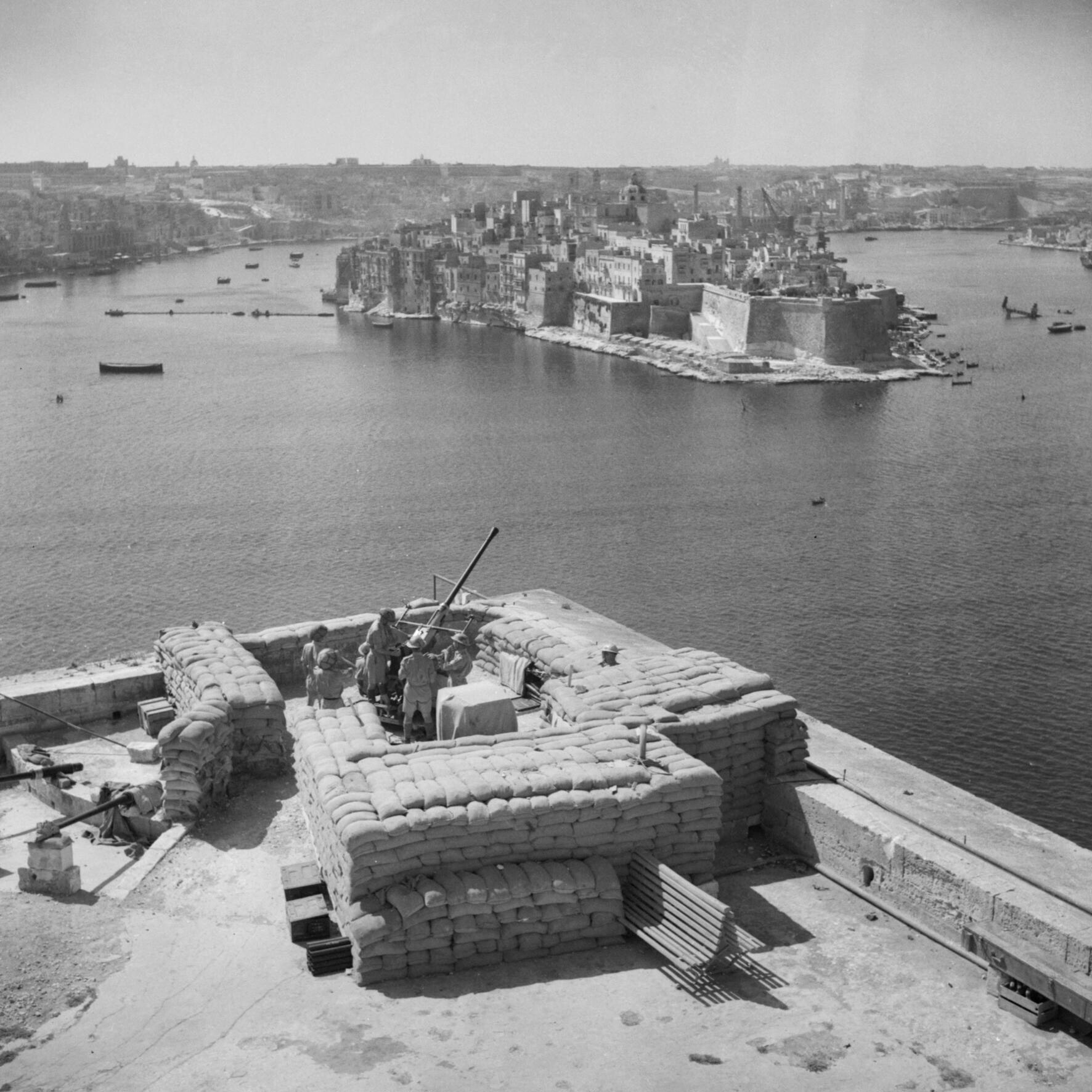
Bofors 40 mm gun at the Saluting Battery in 1942

In 1939, just before the beginning of World War II, the guns were all removed to be deployed for coastal defence. A single Bofors 40mm anti-aircraft gun was placed on the right salient of the battery to protect the Malta Dockyard. The battery was manned by the 3rd Light Anti-Aircraft Regiment of the Royal Malta Artillery. The Upper Barrakka and the Saluting Battery were significantly damaged by aerial bombardment. During the war, the Lascaris War Rooms were built in tunnels dug under the battery and gardens.

After the war, the damage to the battery and gardens was repaired. Its armament was briefly replaced by four 25-pounder QF Mk I guns. These were removed a few years later in 1954, when the battery was shut down and transferred to the Royal Navy as part of its complex in Fort Lascaris. In 1965, the part of the battery that was still military property was handed over to the civil government and the whole area was turned into a garden.

=== Restoration ===
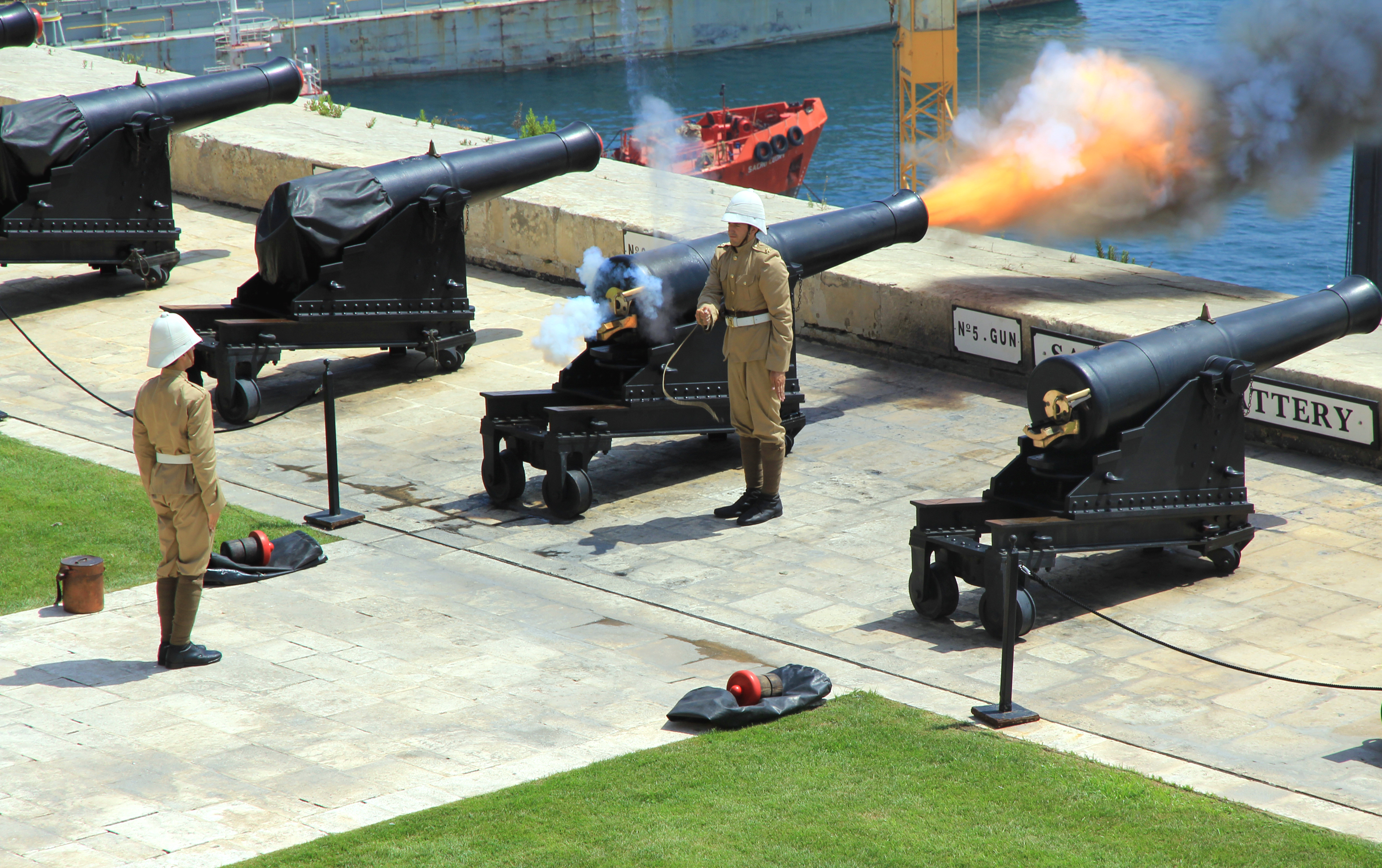
One of the guns at the battery firing a salute

Fondazzjoni Wirt Artna, the Malta Heritage Trust, acquired the battery in 2004 and began to restore it to its late 19th-century configuration. It now has working cannon, artillery stores, a gunpowder magazine, a collection of historic ordinance and a small museum.

After restoration, the battery was initially equipped with eight original 24-pounder Blomefield cannon made between 1790 and 1810, but these were transferred to a museum and replaced with eight working replicas of SBBL 32-pounders in 2011. During restoration works in 2011, about a hundred stone cannonballs were found at the site.

The battery is now open daily between Monday and Saturday, and guided tours are available. Gun salutes are fired every day except Sunday at 1200 and 1600, and cruise liners visiting the Grand Harbour can also commission seven-gun salutes.

== Gallery ==
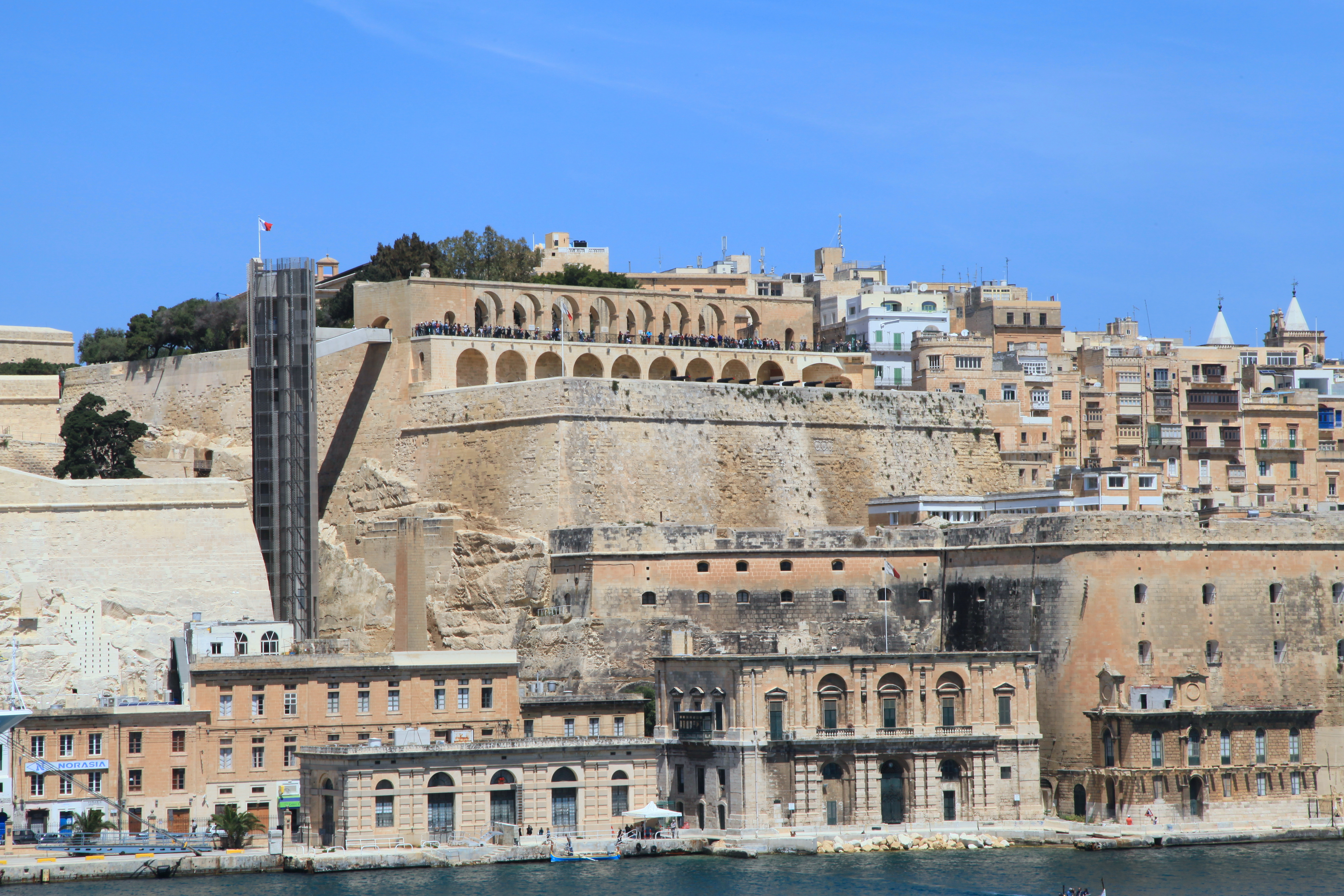
The Saluting Battery as seen from Senglea

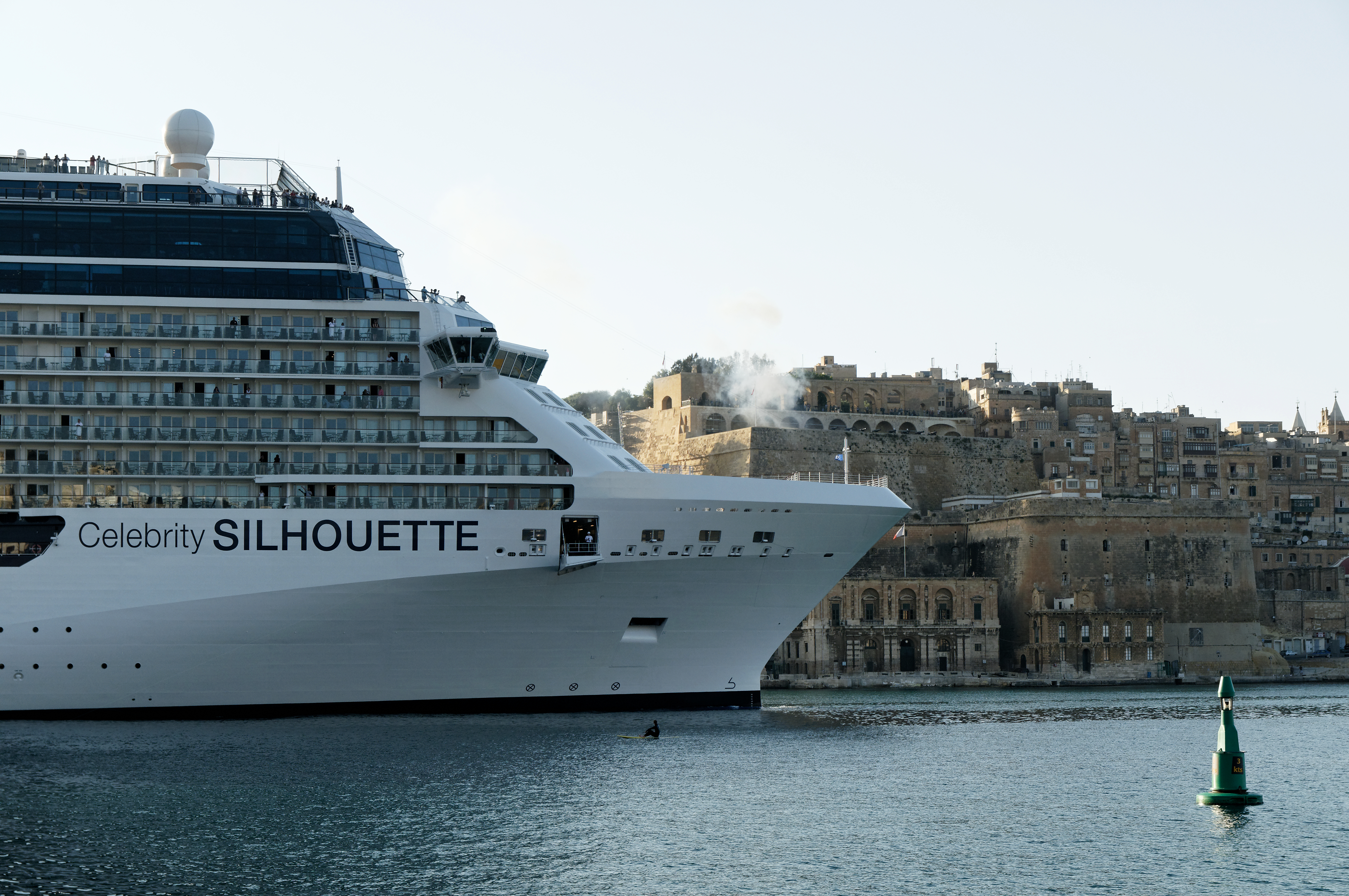
Firing a salute for Celebrity Silhouette

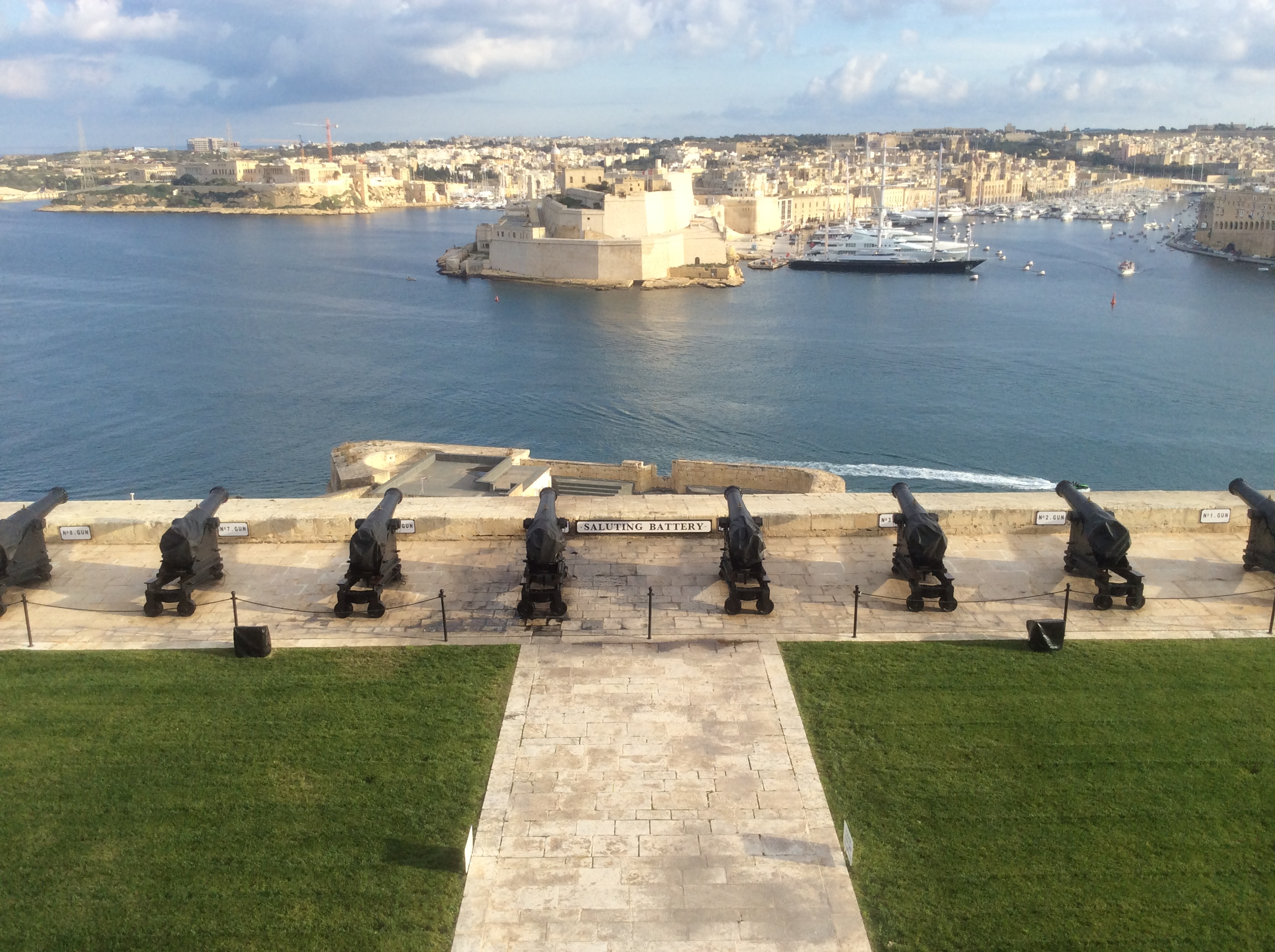
The battery overlooking Fort Saint Angelo

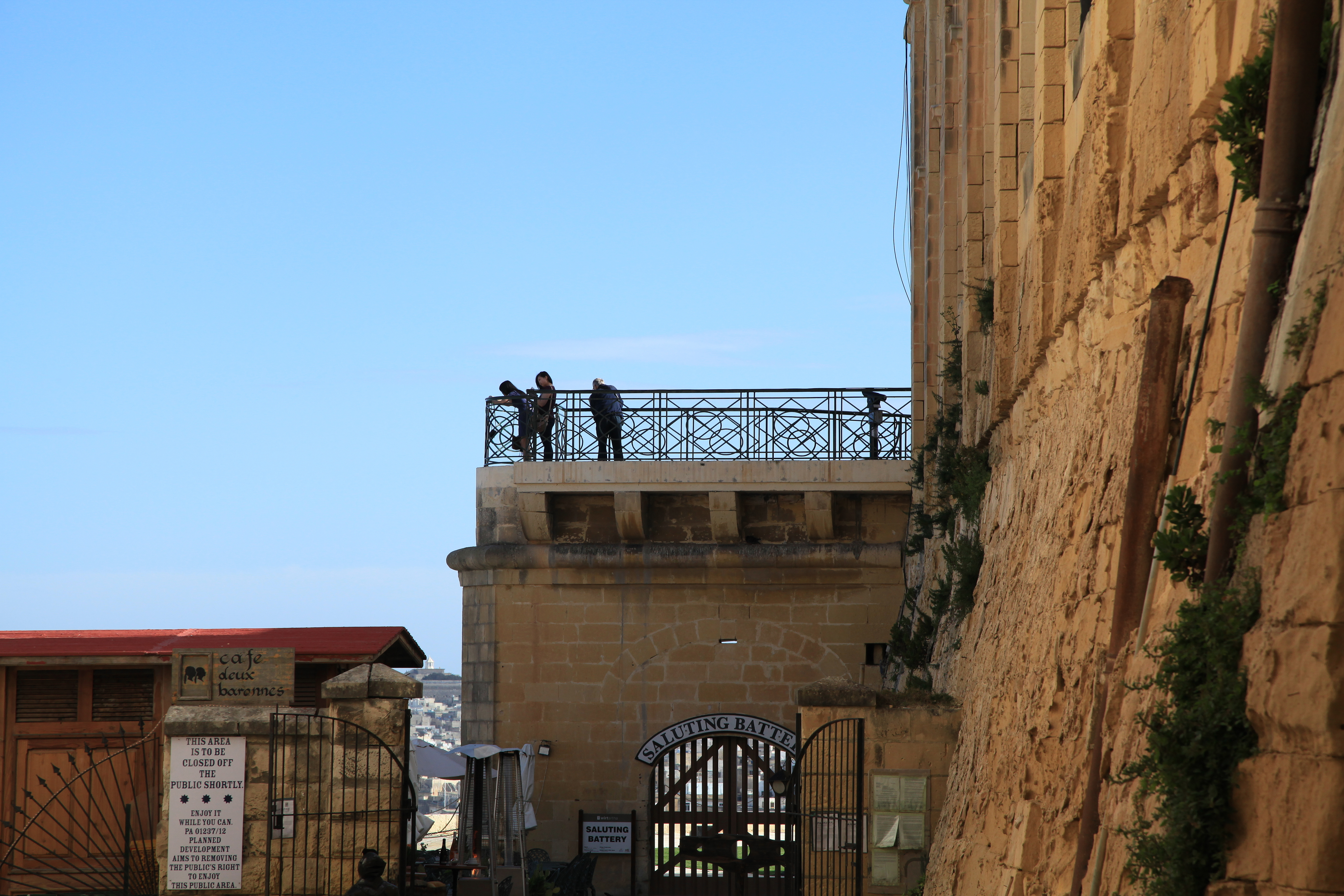
Original entrance to the battery

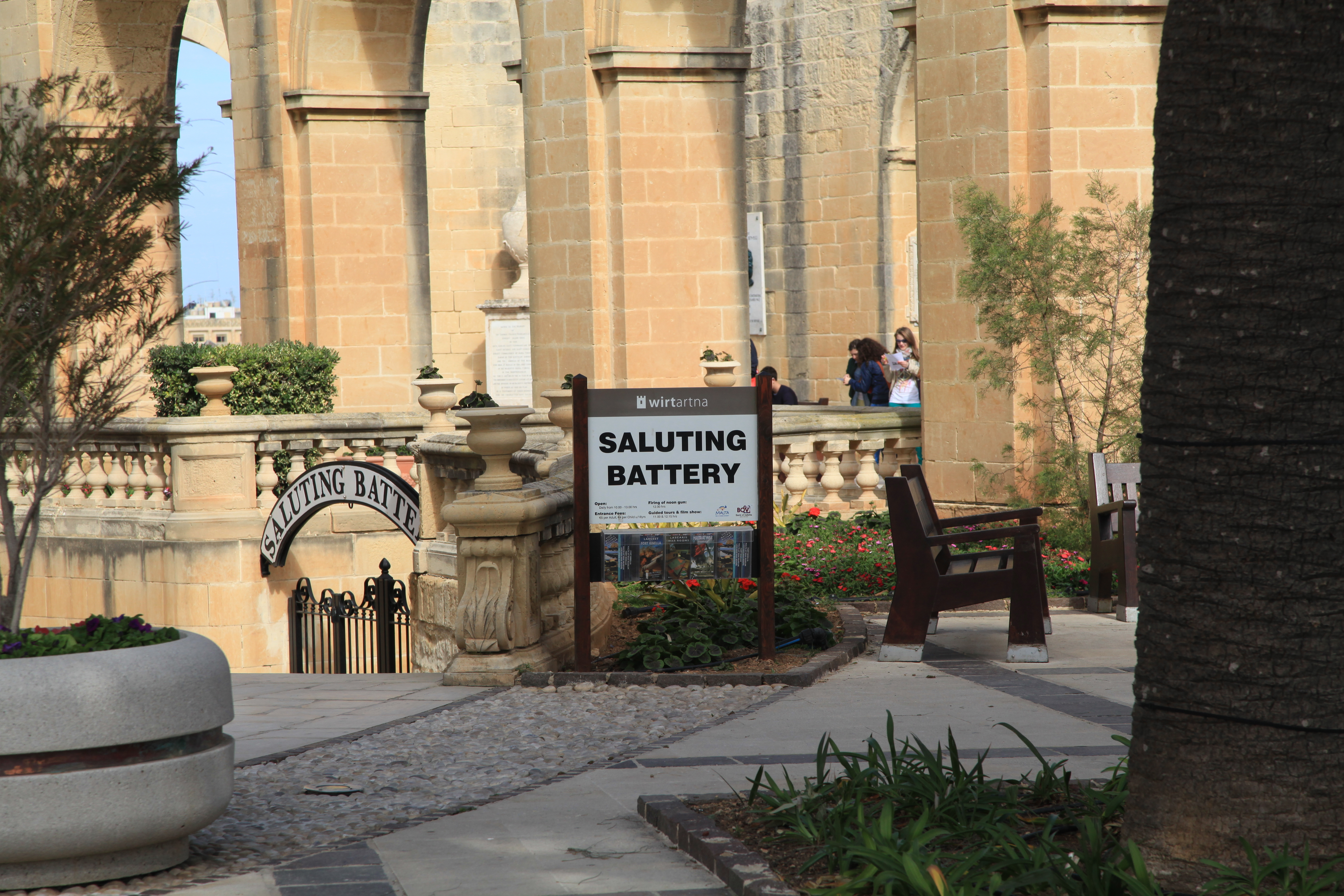
1920s entrance to the battery

== See also ==
- Saluting Battery, a former battery in Gibraltar
