= Gun salute =

Shots from an artillery gun performed as a military honour

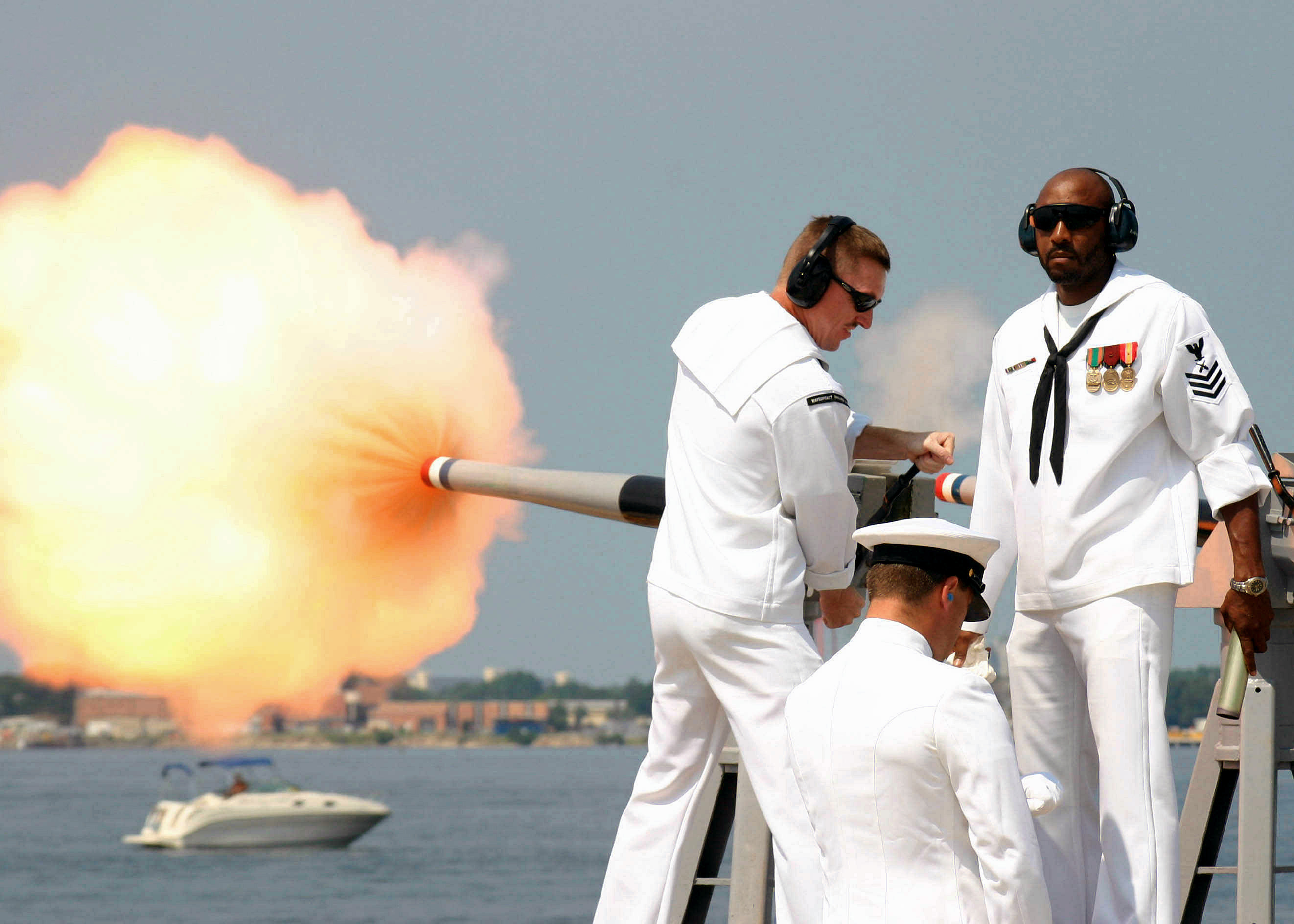
A cannon on a naval vessel's deck fired during the arrival of a dignitary

A gun salute or cannon salute is the use of a piece of artillery to fire shots, often 21 in number for higher ranks (21-gun salute), with the aim of marking an honor or celebrating a joyful event. It is a tradition in many countries around the world.

== History ==
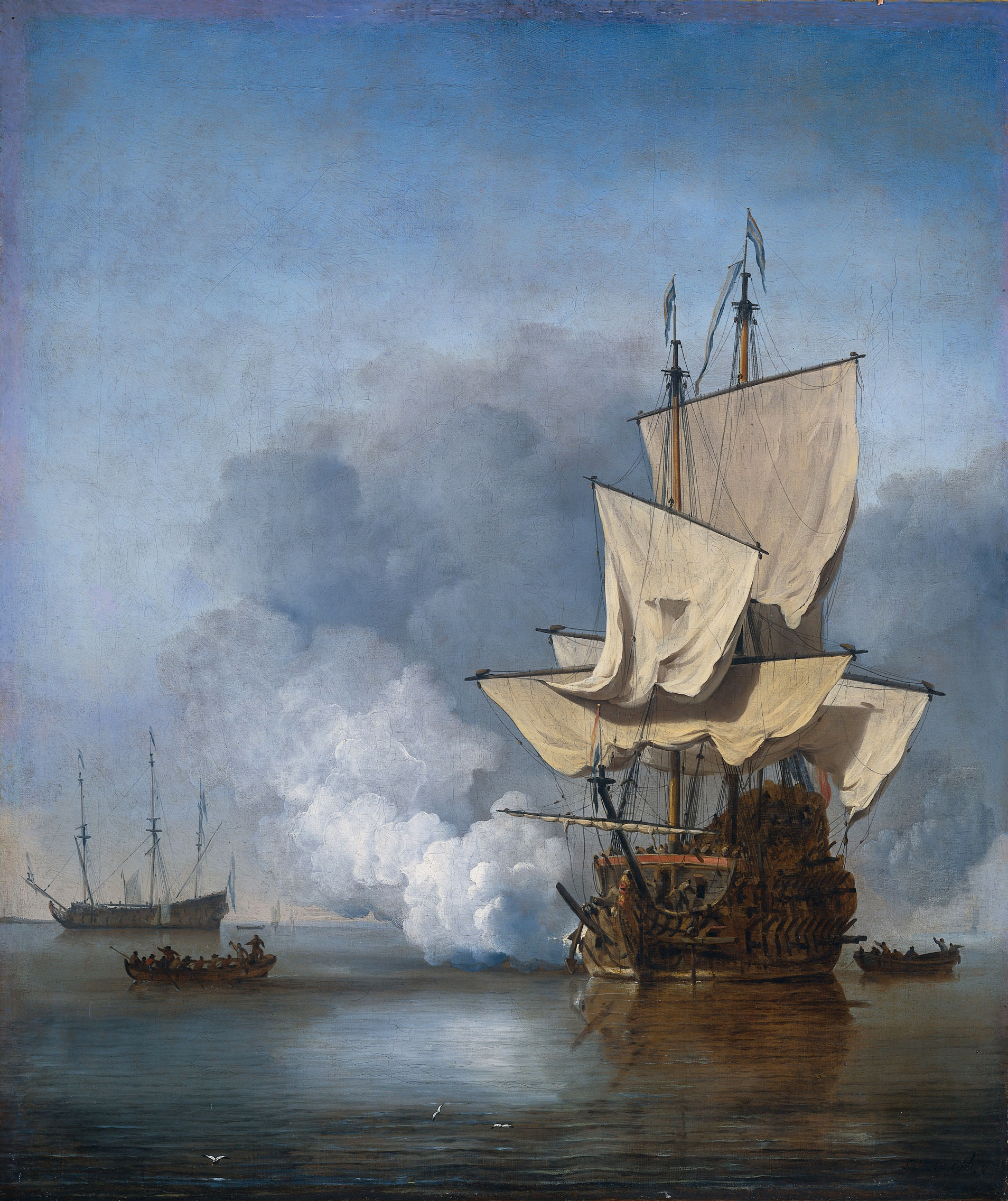
Het kanonschot painting by Willem van de Velde the Younger.

Firing cannons is a maritime tradition that dates back to the 14th century, when the cannon began to impose itself on the battlefields: a boat entering the waters of a country unloads its weapons and thus marks its intentions as peaceful. The coastal batteries or the boats encountered then respond to this salute. If 7 cannon shots are fired at the start, corresponding to the number of guns on board a boat, in addition to the symbolism of the number seven, this number increases to 21, since it was considered that for a shot fired by a boat, the batteries on land had enough powder for three rounds.

== 21-gun salute ==
A 21-gun salute is the most commonly recognized of the customary gun salutes that are performed by the firing of cannon or artillery as a military honor. As naval customs evolved, 21 guns came to be fired for heads of state, or in exceptional circumstances for heads of government. While the 21-gun salute is the most commonly recognized, the number of rounds fired in any given salute will vary depending on the conditions. Circumstances affecting these variations include the particular occasion and, in the case of military and state funerals, the branch of service, and rank (or office) of the person to whom honors are being rendered, with the number decreasing with the rank.

== Other numbered salutes ==
To honor the 75th birthday of King Charles III, a number of special salutes were fired. A 41-gun salute was fired by the King's Troop Royal Horse Artillery in London's Green Park. This was one of a number of gun salutes on the day, including a 62-gun salute at the Tower of London.

== Minute gun salute ==
The firing of guns at intervals of one minute is a traditional expression of mourning used at sea and at state funerals. In the United Kingdom in 1837 at the funeral of King William IV, guns were fired all day, but for Queen Victoria, there was a salute of eighty-one minute guns, one for each year of her life, a custom that has continued at royal funerals since. In the United States, at noon on the day of presidential funerals, military installations across the country fire a 21-minute gun salute.

== By type ==
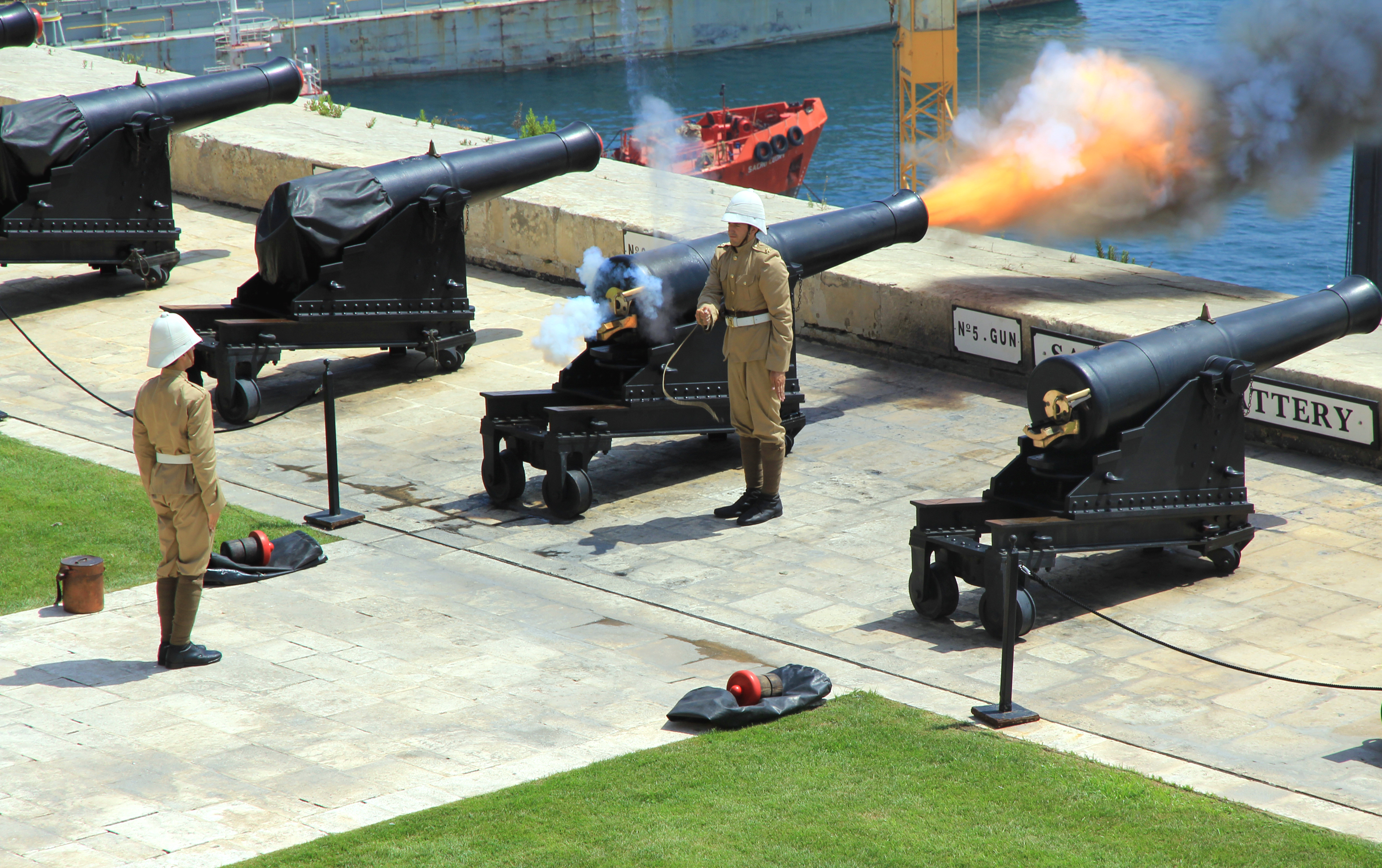
The Saluting Battery in Valletta firing a gun salute

=== Naval cannon fire ===
When a cannon was fired, it partially disarmed the ship until reloaded, so needlessly firing a cannon showed respect and trust. As a matter of courtesy a warship would fire her guns harmlessly out to sea, to show that she had no hostile intent. At first, ships were required to fire seven guns; meanwhile forts, with their more numerous guns and a larger supply of gunpowder, were required meanwhile to fire 21 times. Later, as the quality of gunpowder improved, the British increased the number of shots required from ships to match the forts.

The system of odd-numbered rounds originated from Samuel Pepys, Secretary to the Navy in the Restoration, as a way of economising on the use of powder, the rule until that time having been that all guns had to be fired. Odd numbers were chosen, as even numbers indicated a death.

As naval customs evolved, the 21-gun salute came to be reserved for heads of state, with fewer rounds used to salute lower-ranking officials. Today, in the US Armed Forces, heads of government and cabinet ministers (e.g., the Vice President, U.S. cabinet members, and service secretaries), and military officers with five-star rank receive 19 rounds; four-stars receive 17 rounds; three-stars receive 15; two-stars receive 13; and a one-star general or admiral receives 11. These same standards are currently adhered to by ground-based saluting batteries.

Multiples of 21-gun salutes may be fired for particularly important celebrations. In monarchies this is often done at births of members of the royal family of the country and other official celebrations associated with the royal family.

=== United States Army Presidential Salute Battery ===
A specialty platoon of the 3rd US Infantry Regiment (The Old Guard), the Presidential Salute Battery is based at Fort Myer, Virginia. The Guns Platoon (as it is known for short) has the task of rendering military honors in the National Capital Region, including armed forces full-honors funerals; state funerals; presidential inaugurations; full-honors wreath ceremonies at the Tomb of the Unknowns in Arlington National Cemetery; state arrivals at the White House and Pentagon, and retirement ceremonies for general-grade officers in the Military District of Washington, which are normally conducted at Fort Myer.

The Presidential Salute Battery also participates in A Capitol Fourth, the Washington Independence Day celebration; the guns accompany the National Symphony Orchestra in performing the "1812 Overture".

The platoon maintains its battery of ten ceremonially-modified World War II-vintage M5 anti-tank guns at the Old Guard regimental motor pool.

== See also ==
- Three-volley salute
- Feu de joie
