= Lord Frederick FitzClarence =

British soldier and royal bastard (1799–1854)

Lieutenant-General Lord Frederick FitzClarence GCH
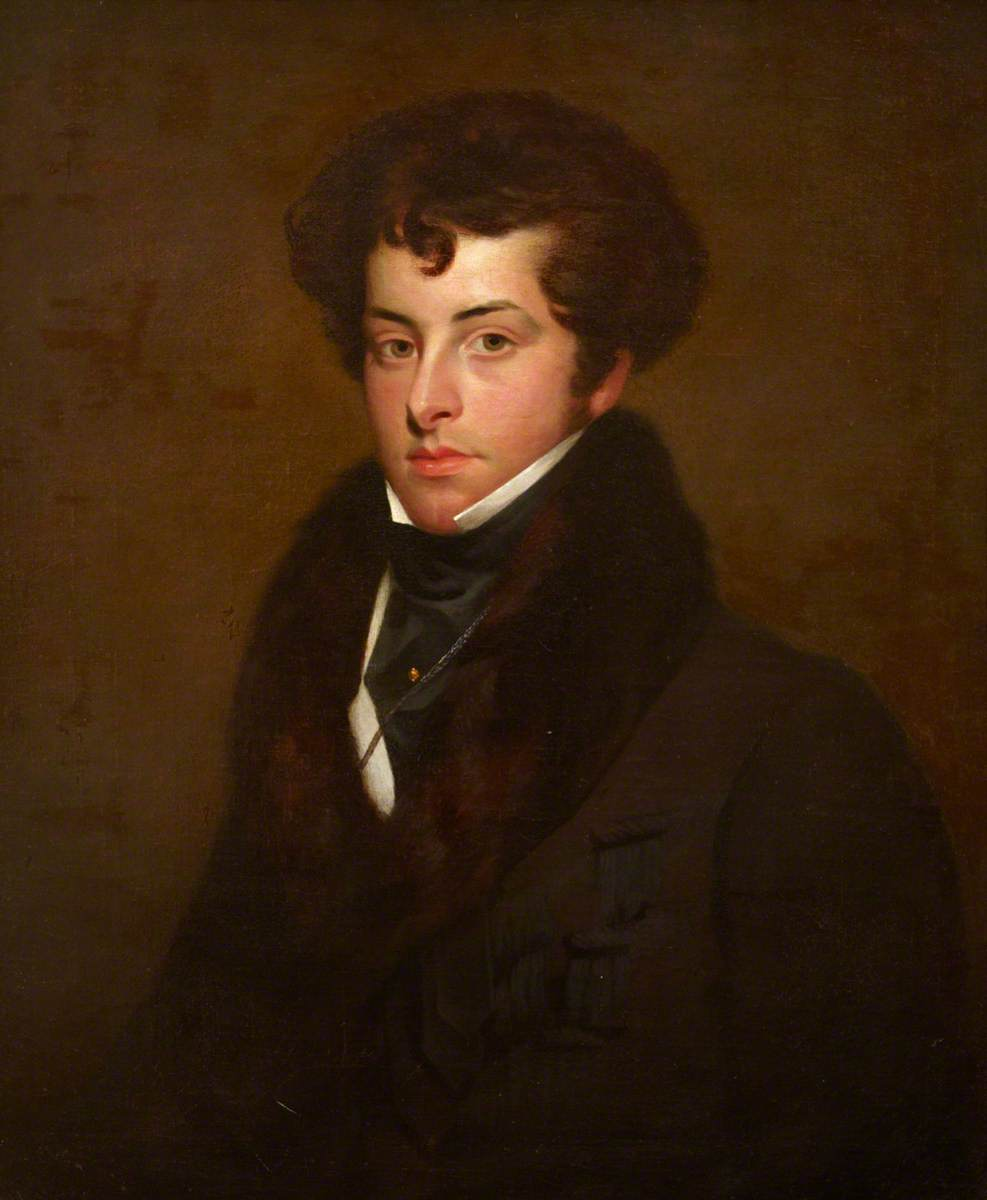
- Born: 9 December 1799
- Died: 30 October 1854 (aged 54)
- Spouse: Lady Augusta Boyle (m. 1821)
- Children: Augusta FitzClarence; William FitzClarence
- Relatives: William IV (father); Dorothea Jordan (mother)
- Military career
- Allegiance: United Kingdom
- Branch: British Army
- Service years: 1814–1854
- Rank: Lieutenant-General
- Commands: Bombay Army
- Awards: Knight Grand Cross of the Royal Guelphic Order

Lieutenant-General Lord Frederick FitzClarence, GCH (9 December 1799 – 30 October 1854) was a British Army officer and the third, recognised, illegitimate son of King William IV by his mistress Dorothea Jordan.

== Military career ==
FitzClarence was commissioned as an officer in the British Army in 1814. While a captain in the Coldstream Guards, FitzClarence commanded a small detachment of Guards to act in support of the police with the arrest of the Cato Street conspirators in 1820. The arrest was not straightforward, and a scuffle ensued.

FitzClarence gained the rank of colonel in the 36th (Herefordshire) Regiment of Foot. On 24 May 1831, he was granted the rank of a marquess' younger son by his father, William IV, upon the latter's ascension to the throne. Having been invested as a Knight Grand Cross of the Royal Guelphic Order (G.C.H.) that same year, he became Lieutenant-Governor of Portsmouth and General Officer Commanding South-West District in 1847, and then Commander-in-Chief of the Bombay Army in 1852. He died in office in October 1854.

== Coat of arms ==
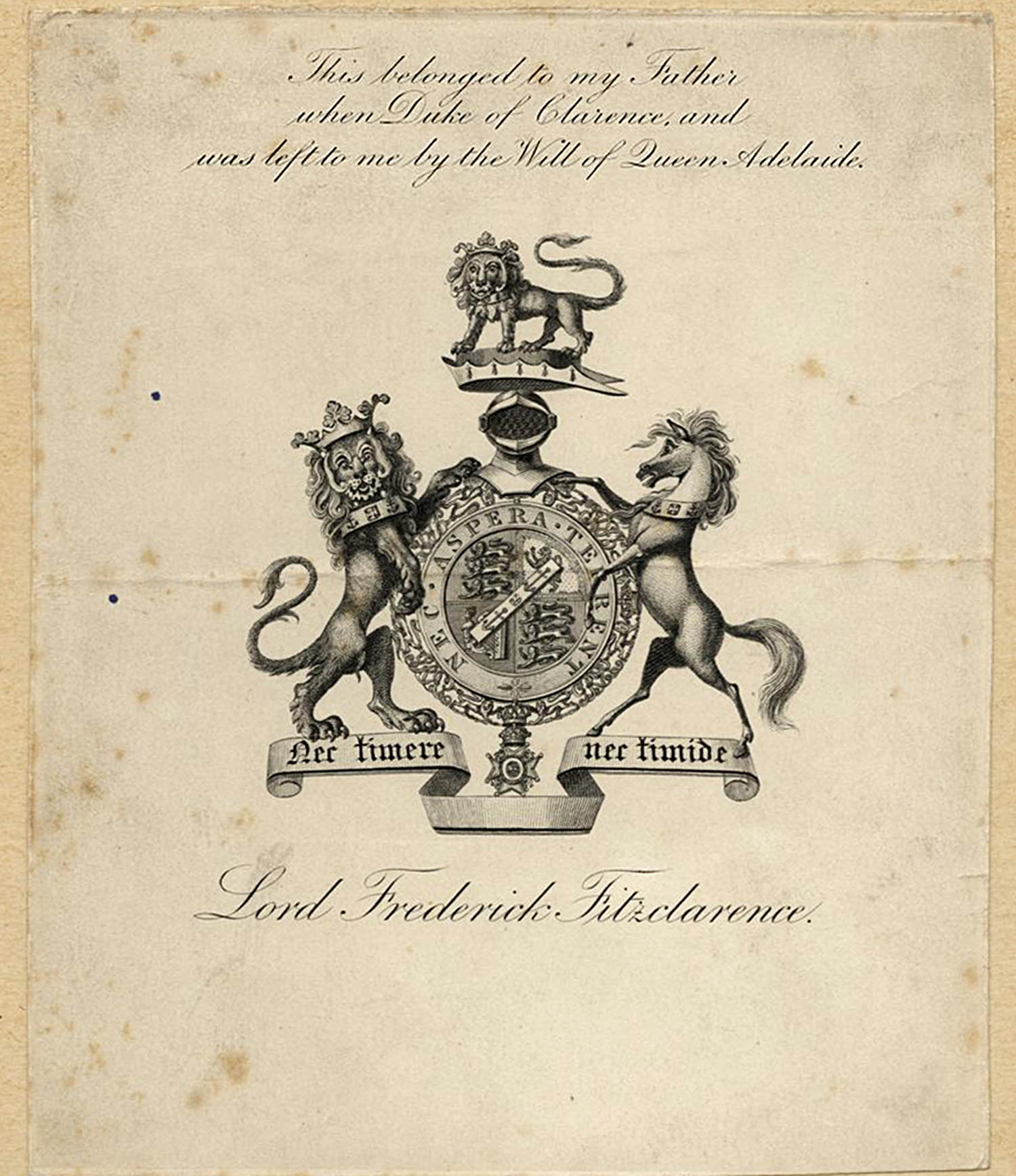
Bookplate showing the coat of arms of Lord Frederick FitzClarence, inscribed: "This belonged to my Father when Duke of Clarence and was left to me by the Will of Queen Adelaide"

The coat of arms of Lord Frederick FitzClarence were the royal arms of King William IV (without the escutcheon of the Arch Treasurer of the Holy Roman Empire and without the Crown of Hanover) debruised by a baton sinister (azure(?)) charged with two anchors (or(?)).

== Family ==
On 19 May 1821, he married Lady Augusta Boyle (d. 28 July 1876), the third daughter of the 4th Earl of Glasgow. They had two children:

- Augusta Georgiana Frederica FitzClarence (December 1823 – 18 September 1855)
- William FitzClarence (b. & d. 1827)

== Ancestry ==
Ancestors of Lord Frederick FitzClarence

16. George II of Great Britain
8. Frederick, Prince of Wales
17. Caroline of Brandenburg-Ansbach
4. George III of the United Kingdom
18. Frederick II, Duke of Saxe-Gotha-Altenburg
9. Princess Augusta of Saxe-Gotha
19. Magdalena Augusta of Anhalt-Zerbst
2. William IV of the United Kingdom
20. Adolf Frederick II, Duke of Mecklenburg-Strelitz
10. Duke Charles Louis Frederick of Mecklenburg
21. Princess Christiane Emilie of Schwarzburg-Sondershausen
5. Charlotte of Mecklenburg-Strelitz
22. Ernest Frederick I, Duke of Saxe-Hildburghausen
11. Princess Elisabeth Albertine of Saxe-Hildburghausen
23. Countess Sophia Albertine of Erbach-Erbach
1. Lord Frederick FitzClarence
24. James Bland
12. Nathaniel Bland
25. Lucy Brewster
6. Francis Bland
13. Elizabeth Heaton
3. Dorothy Jordan
7. Grace Phillips

Military offices
Preceded by Sir Hercules Pakenham	GOC South-West District; 1847–1851	Succeeded by Sir George D'Aguilar
Preceded by Sir John Grey	C-in-C, Bombay Army; 1852–1854	Succeeded by Sir Henry Somerset
Preceded by Sir Roger Hale Sheaffe, Bt	Colonel of the 36th (Herefordshire) Regiment of Foot; 1851–1854	Succeeded by William Henry Scott
Masonic offices
Preceded by The Earl of Rothes	Grand Master of the Grand Lodge of Scotland; 1841–1843	Succeeded by Lord Glenlyon
Honorary titles
Preceded by The Earl of Munster	Lieutenant of the Tower of London; 1833	Succeeded by John Sulivan Wood
