= Lascaris War Rooms =

WWII bunkers in Valletta, Malta

- Valletta, Malta
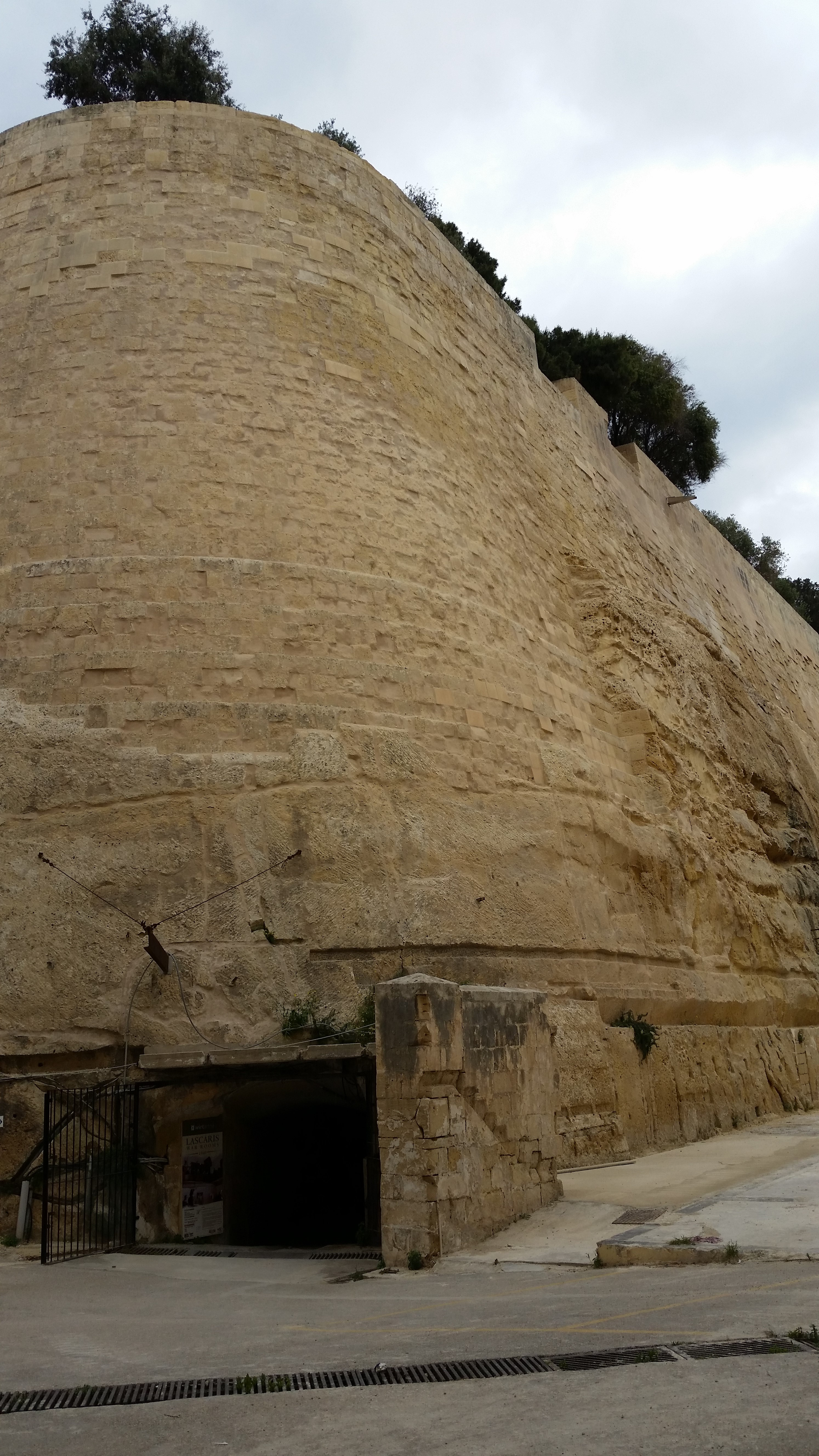
- Entrance to the War Rooms

Site information
- Owner: Government of Malta
- Controlled by: Fondazzjoni Wirt Artna
- Open to the public: Yes
- Condition: Intact
- Website: www.lascariswarrooms.com

Location
- Coordinates: 35°53′40.19″N 14°30′39.78″E

Site history
- Built: 1940–1943
- In use: 1943–1977
- Battles/wars: World War II: Siege of Malta; Allied invasion of Sicily; Suez Crisis

The Lascaris War Rooms are an underground complex of tunnels and chambers in Valletta, Malta that housed the War Headquarters from where the defence of the island was conducted during the Second World War. The rooms were later used by NATO and are now open to the public as a museum.

== History ==
The British started work on the secret underground complex in 1940, during the siege of Malta, when a series of tunnels under the Upper Barrakka Gardens and the Saluting Battery that had been used as slave quarters during the Hospitaller period began to be expanded. The complex was completed in early 1943. The site takes its name from the nearby Lascaris Battery, which was itself named after Giovanni Paolo Lascaris, a Grandmaster who had built a garden on the site later occupied by the battery.

The Lascaris War Rooms contained operations rooms for each of the fighting services, from where both the defence of Malta and other operations in the Mediterranean were coordinated. The Operation Headquarters at Lascaris communicated directly with radar stations around the Maltese islands, and it was equipped with Type X machines. The fleets were led from the Navy Plotting Room, while the Anti-Aircraft Guns Operations Room was responsible for the air defence of the island. In the Coast Defence Room, defensive operations in the case of an amphibious invasion were planned. The Filter Room displayed information received from various places, including the naval station at Auberge de Castille.

Lascaris was the advance Allied HQ from where General Eisenhower and his Supreme Commanders Admiral Cunningham, Field Marshal Montgomery and Air Marshal Tedder directed the Allied invasion of Sicily (Operation Husky) in 1943.

Throughout the war, around 1000 people worked in the rooms, including 240 soldiers.

After the war, Lascaris became the Headquarters of the Royal Navy's Mediterranean Fleet. They played an active part during the Suez Crisis of 1956, and were put into full alert during the Cuban Missile Crisis of 1962, when a Soviet missile strike against Malta was feared.

In 1967, the complex was taken over by NATO to be used as a strategic Communication Centre for the interception of Soviet submarines in the Mediterranean. The war rooms continued to serve this function until they were closed down in 1977.

== Present day ==
The complex was leased to a private venture in 1992, and it was refurbished and opened to the public. The rooms closed down in 2005, but were acquired by Fondazzjoni Wirt Artna and the Malta Heritage Trust in 2009 and are once again open to the public. The site features a reconstruction of the combined operations rooms and their adjoining offices. Audio guides and guided tours are available. In 2024, part of the tunnels were repurposed as a permanent exhibition dedicated to Operation Husky, due to the site's connection to the operation.

== Gallery ==
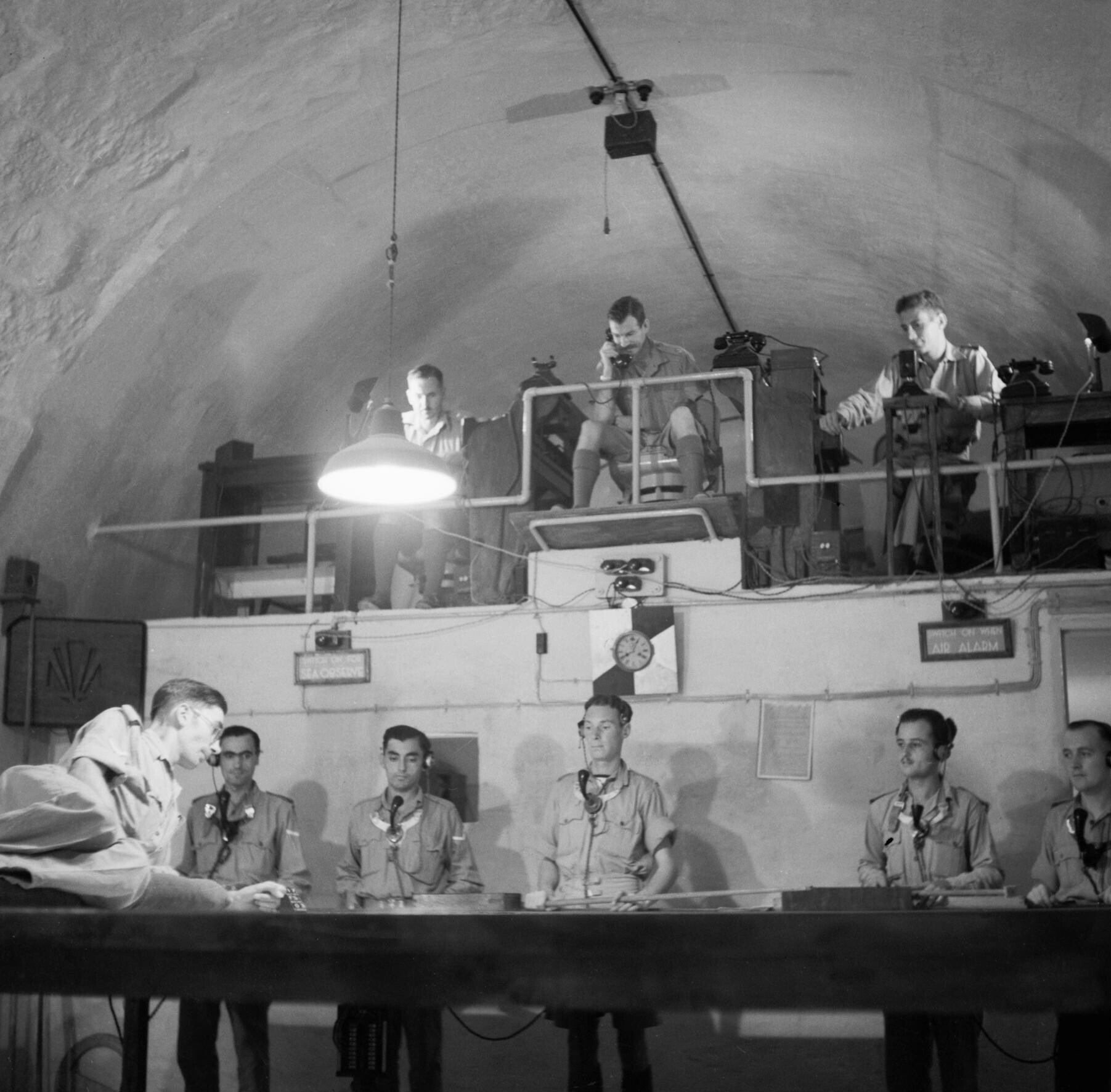
Coastal Defence Room during World War II

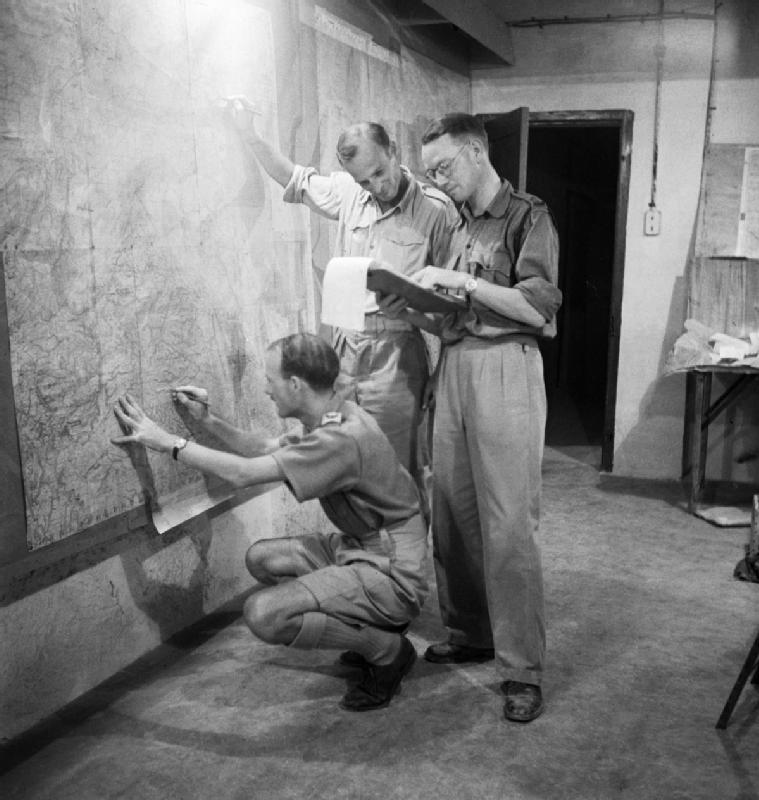
British staff officers plot positions on large wall charts during the invasion of Sicily

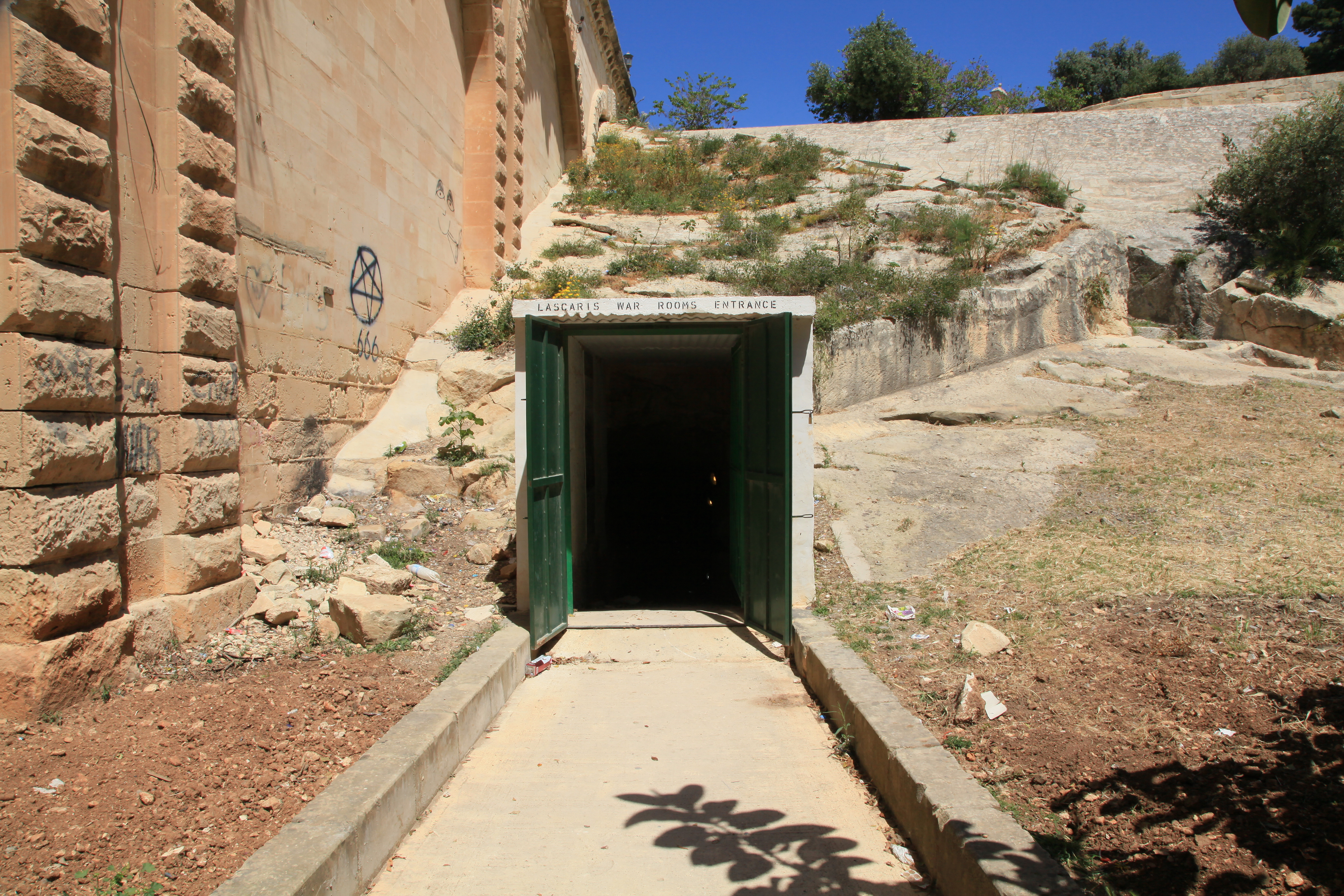
Entrance to the war rooms in St. James Ditch

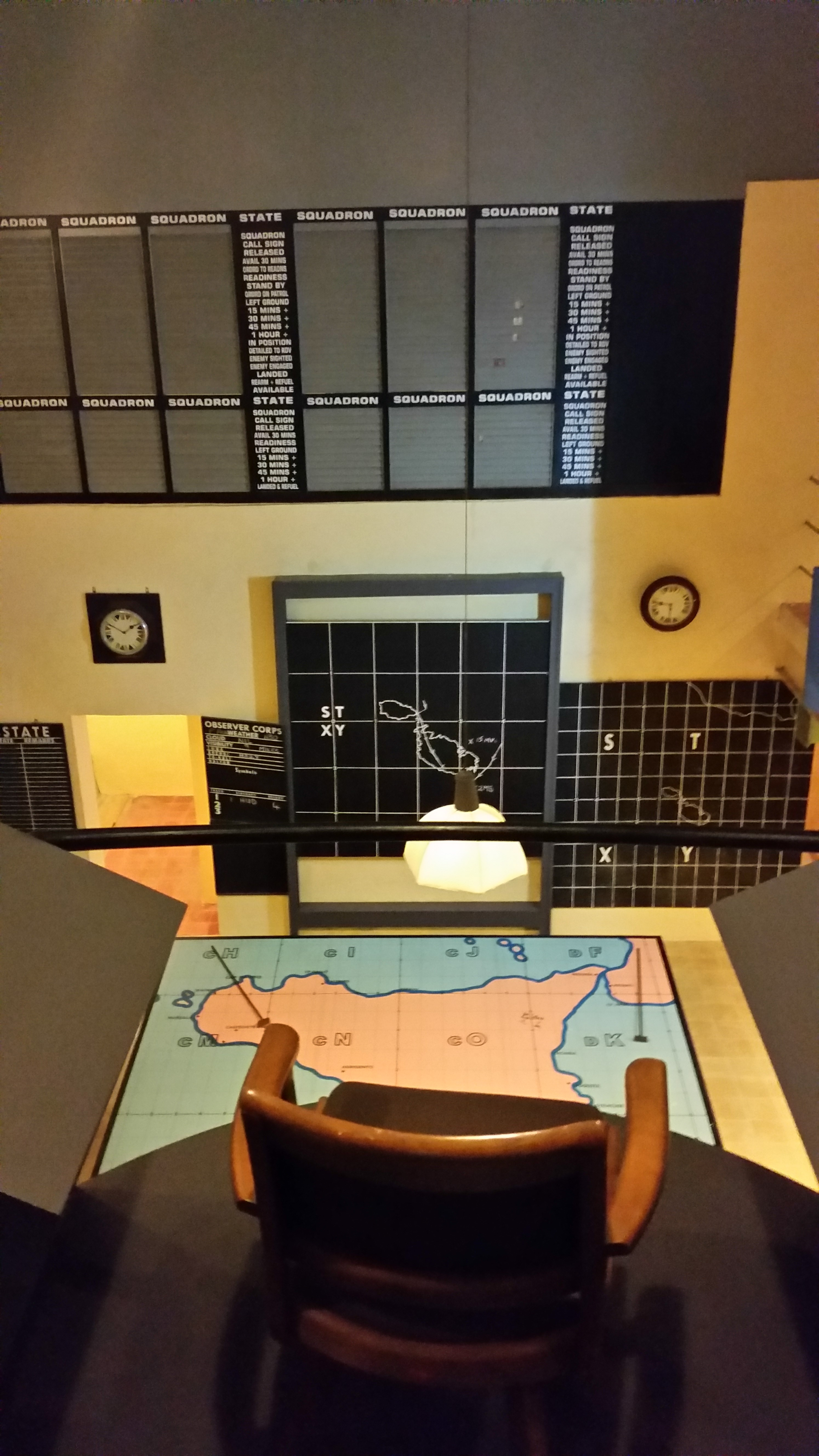
Lascaris War Rooms restored

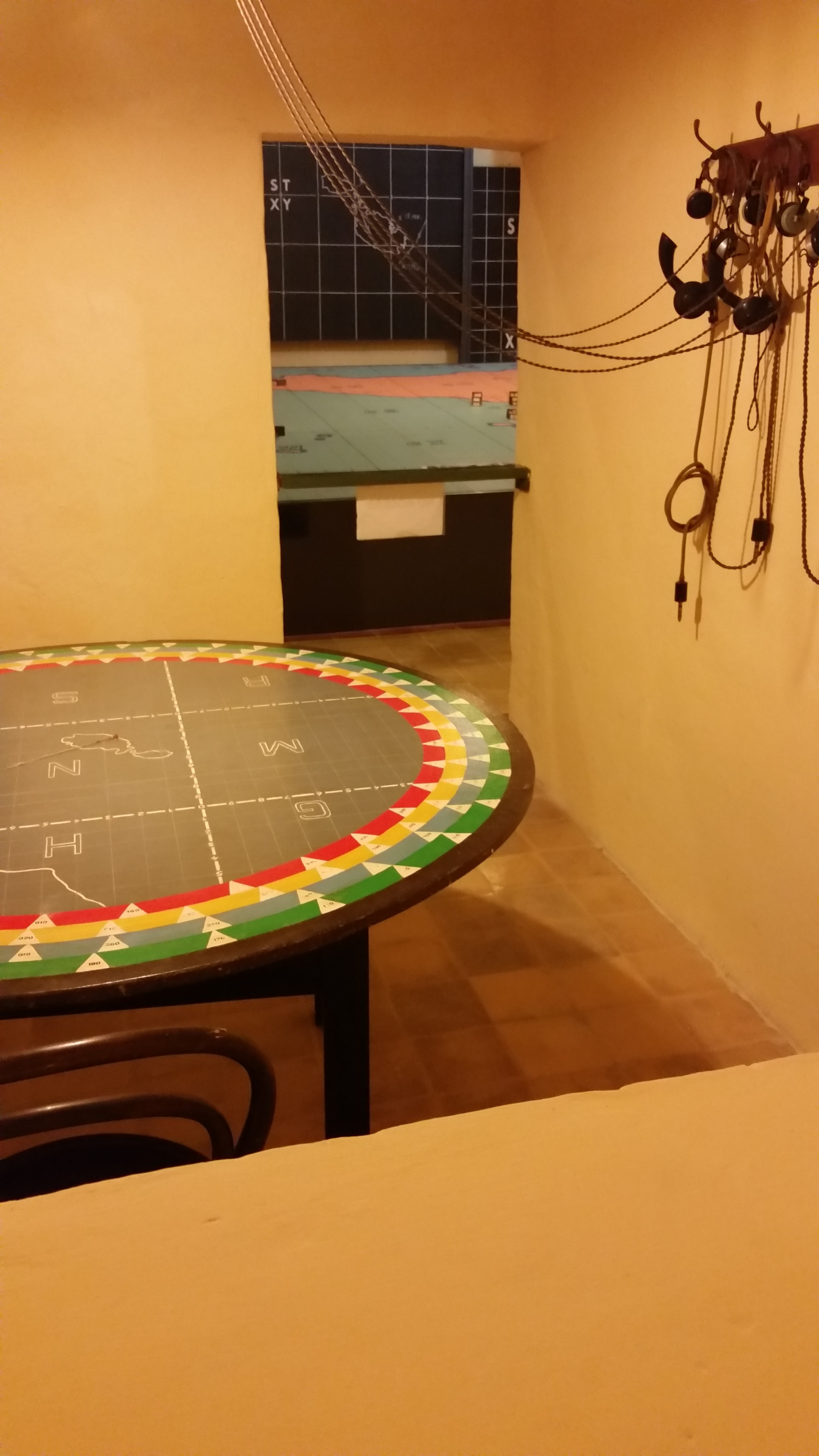
Communication Room

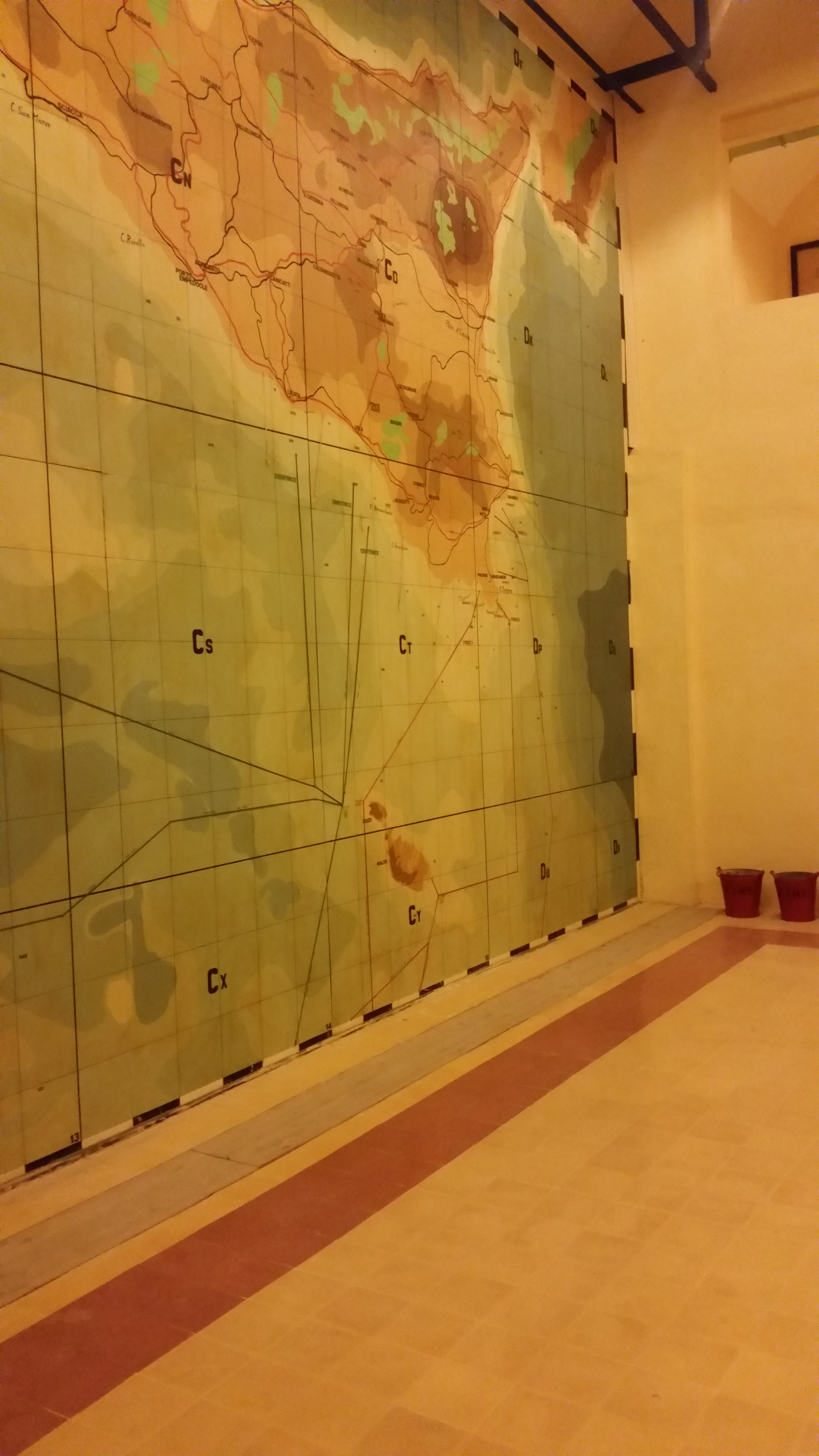
Map of Sicily

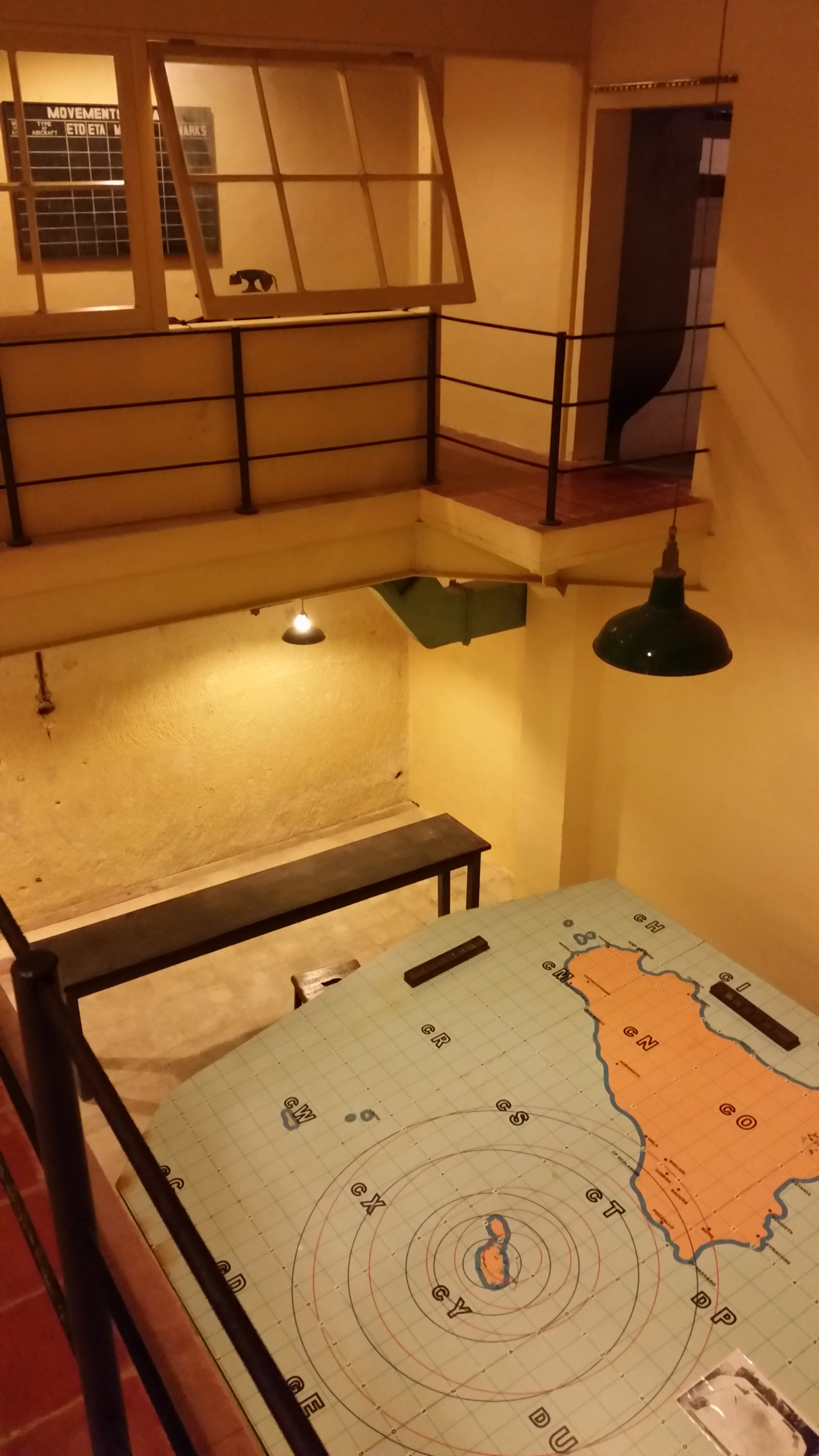
Additional map room
