= Henry Anderson Morshead =

Henry Anderson Morshead (c.1774–1831), in earlier life Henry Anderson, was an Irish colonel of the Royal Engineers.

== Life ==
Born about 1774, he was the son of Colonel Henry Anderson of Fox Hall, County Limerick. He entered the Royal Military Academy, Woolwich on 29 May 1790, and received a commission as second lieutenant in the Royal Artillery on 18 September 1792.

Anderson served in the campaigns on the continent of Europe under Prince Frederick, Duke of York and Albany in 1793–4, and was present at the Battle of Famars 23 May 1793, the Siege of Valenciennes (1793) in June and July, the Siege of Dunkirk (1793) in August and September, and the Battle of Hondschoote 8 September. He was then transferred, at his own request, to the Royal Engineers on 1 January 1794. He took part in the Siege of Landrecies (1794), Battle of Tournay (1794), and siege of Nijmegen in November.

On his return to England, Anderson was sent, in June 1795, to Plymouth. He was promoted first lieutenant on 19 November 1796, and in May 1797 he embarked with two companies of Royal Sappers and Miners for Santo Domingo, West Indies. When the British left the island of Hispaniola in 1798 he was attached to the staff of Sir Thomas Maitland, who became a lifelong. Back in England in November 1798, he was employed in the Thames division, and stationed at Gravesend. He was promoted captain-lieutenant 18 April 1801, and was sent to Portsmouth, and subsequently to Plymouth.

Promoted captain 1 March 1805, Anderson in that year he assumed by royal license the additional surname of Morshead. In July 1807 he was sent to Dublin, and three months later was appointed commanding Royal Engineer of the Madeira expedition under Brigadier-general William Beresford. They sailed from Cork early in 1808, and in February took possession of the island.

Morshead remained in Madeira until 1812, and on his return to England in November of that year was posted to the Plymouth division. He was promoted lieutenant-colonel 21 July 1813, and sent to Dublin; was appointed commanding Royal Engineer in North Britain (March 1814), and in July 1815 was transferred as commanding Royal Engineer of the western district to Plymouth. There he remained for many years, and carried out major works for the ordnance and naval services in consultation with the Duke of Wellington and Robert Dundas, 2nd Viscount Melville. On 29 July 1825 he was promoted colonel.

In 1829 Morshead was appointed commanding Royal Engineer at Malta. He died at Valletta on 11 November 1831, while the acting governor. He was honoured with a public funeral, and was buried in the old saluting battery overlooking the grand harbour. Numerous plans by him went to the War Office.

== Family ==
Anderson married in 1800 Elizabeth, only daughter of Phillip Morshead, of Widey Court, Plymouth. They had 11 children. Their daughter Louisa married George Leslie, 15th Earl of Rothes. The second son John Philip Anderson Morshead (died 1881) was father of Edmund Doidge Anderson Morshead.
