= Saint John's Cavalier =

- Kavallier ta' San Ġwann
- Part of the fortifications of Valletta
- Valletta, Malta
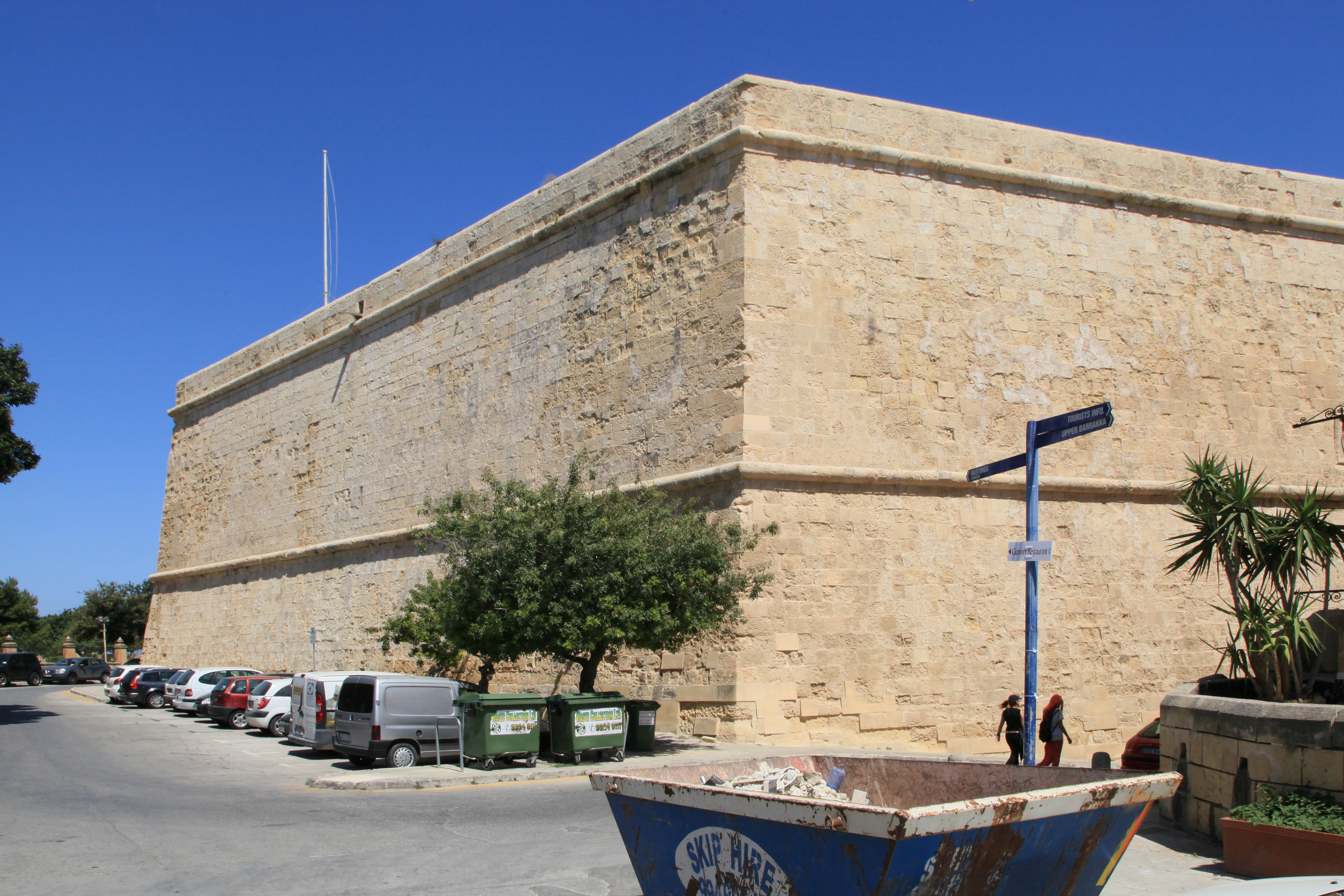
- Saint John's Cavalier

- Coat of arms of the SMOM

Site information
- Type: Cavalier
- Owner: Government of Malta
- Controlled by: Sovereign Military Order of Malta
- Open to the public: No
- Condition: Intact

Location
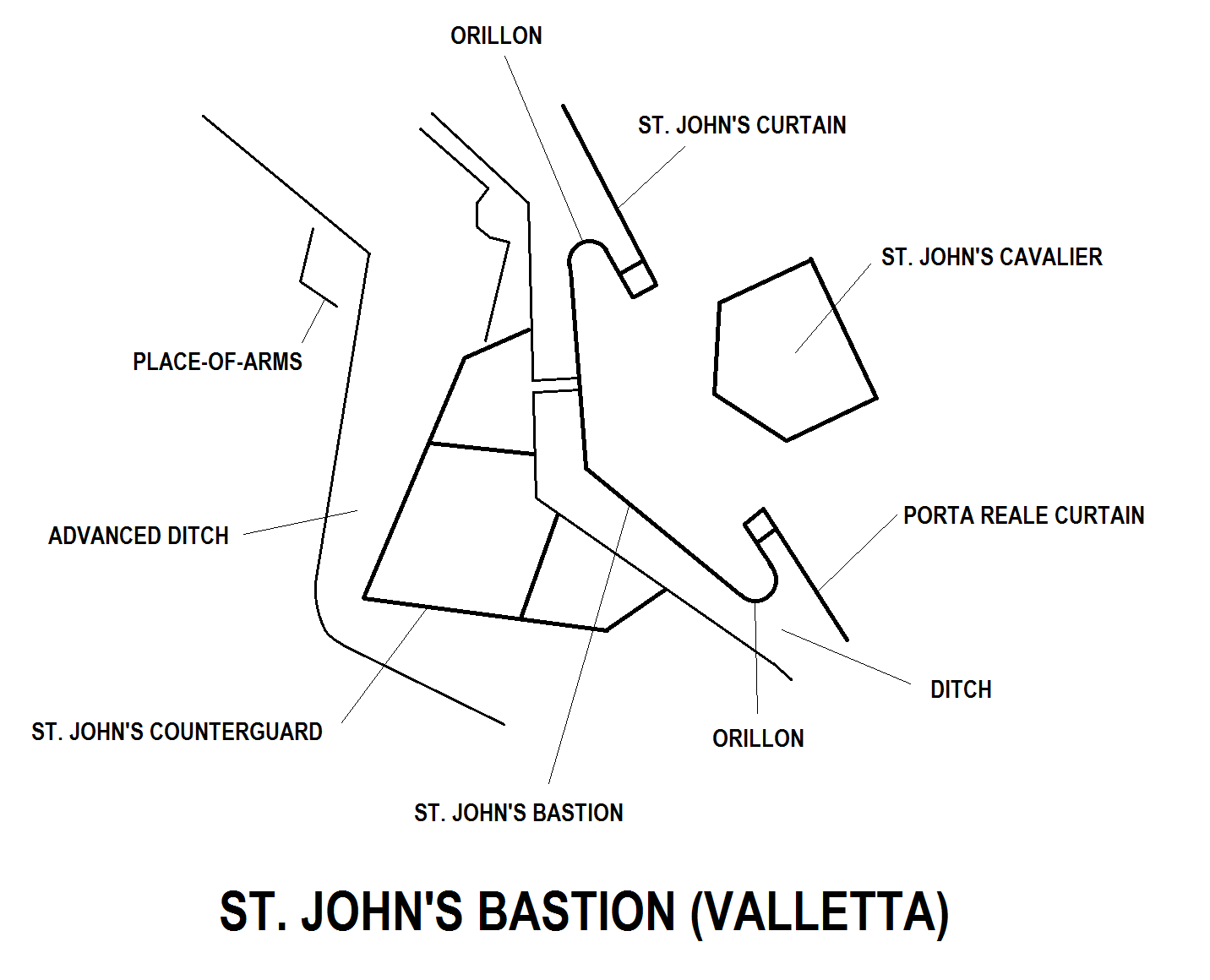
- Map of St. John's Bastion with its cavalier and counterguard
- Coordinates: 35°53′50.15″N 14°30′31.53″E

Site history
- Built: 1560s
- Built by: Order of Saint John
- Materials: Limestone

Saint John's Cavalier (Maltese: Kavallier ta' San Ġwann) is a 16th-century cavalier in Valletta, Malta, which was built by the Order of St. John. It overlooks St. John's Bastion, a large obtuse-angled bastion forming part of the Valletta Land Front. St. John was one of nine planned cavaliers in the city, although eventually only two were built, the other one being the identical Saint James Cavalier. It was designed by the Italian military engineer Francesco Laparelli, while its construction was overseen by his Maltese assistant Girolamo Cassar.

The cavalier is located close to the City Gate Arcade and Hastings Gardens. Today, the cavalier is the embassy of the Sovereign Military Order of Malta, the successor of the Order who built it in the first place.

== History ==
Following the Great Siege of Malta of 1565, in which the Ottoman Empire attempted to take over Malta but failed to do so, the Order of St. John decided to settle permanently on the island. The Order decided to build a new fortified city as their new capital, and it was called Valletta after Grand Master Jean Parisot de Valette. In order to do this, De Valette asked for financial aid from various European rulers. Pope Pius V not only helped out financially, but he also sent the Italian military engineer Francesco Laparelli to Malta in order to design the new capital's fortifications. Construction of the city began in March 1566, and work continued throughout the 1570s. Following Laparelli's departure from Malta and his subsequent death, construction of the city was entrusted to his Maltese assistant, the architect and military engineer Girolamo Cassar.

St. John's Cavalier was one of the first buildings to be built in Valletta, along with the Church of Our Lady of Victories and the rest of the fortifications. The cavalier was built as a raised platform on which guns were placed to defend the city against attacks from the landward side, in the area were the town of Floriana was later built. As well as prohibiting entry, St. John's could also threaten those who had already breached the city's defences. It was linked to Saint James Cavalier by a now-blocked underground passageway.

In 1646, Grand Master Giovanni Paolo Lascaris grafted a number of warehouses for the storage of gunpowder and muskets on the flank and gorge of the cavalier. The warehouses were demolished in the late 1950s, and the commemorative inscription which was located on their façade is now affixed on the wall of the cavalier.

The cavalier was used by British forces during World War II.

=== Embassy ===
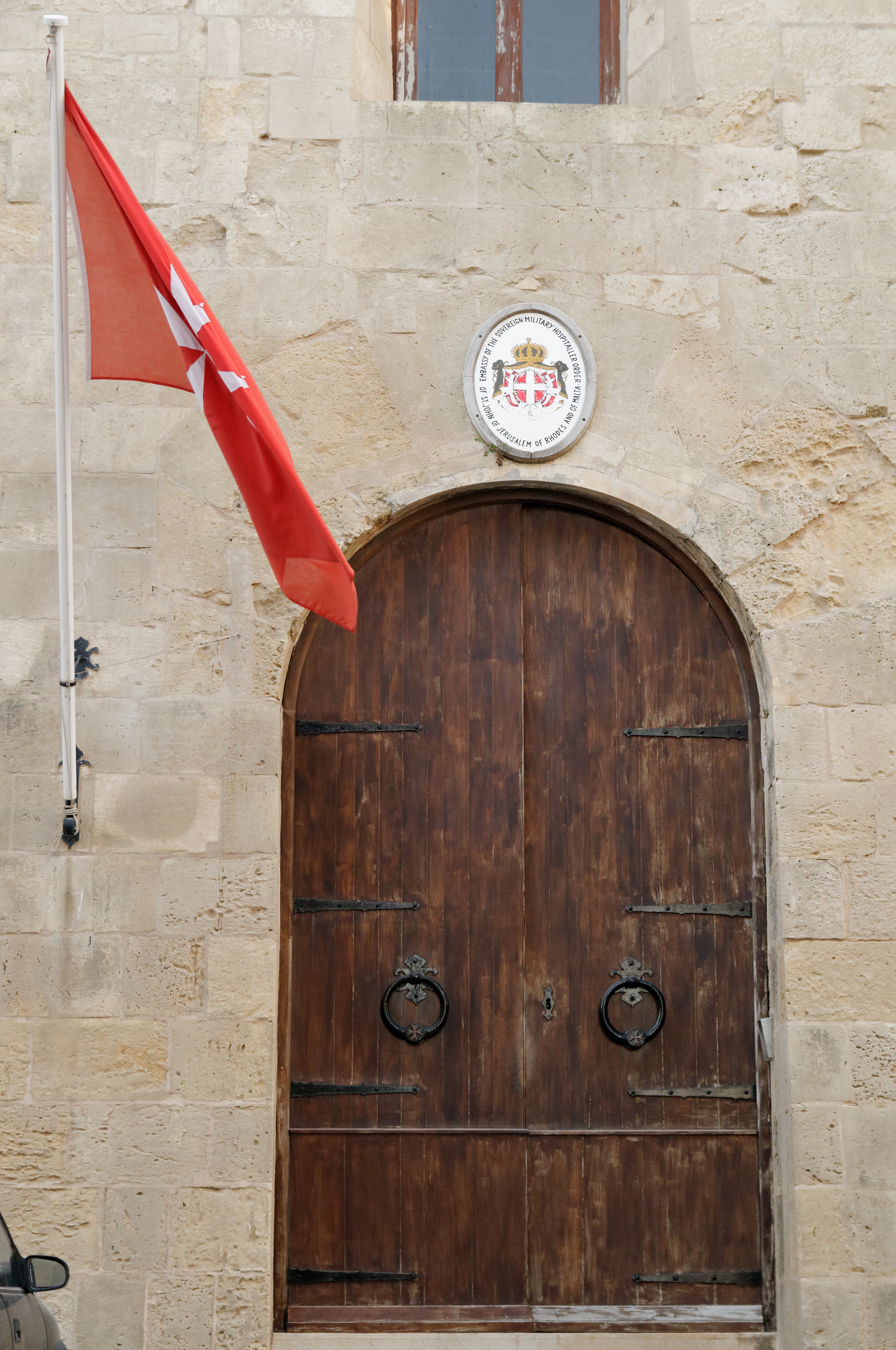
The cavalier houses the embassy of the Sovereign Military Order of Malta

In 1967, the Government of Malta leased the cavalier to the Sovereign Military Order of Malta, the successor of the Order of St. John, for 99 years. The SMOM established its embassy in Malta there, and it was restored under the direction of ambassador Dino Marrajeni, and the Maltese engineer Roger de Giorgio, an expert on restoration of historical buildings. Within two years restoration was complete, and while modern alterations were made, care was taken to preserve all the original features of the building. An unobtrusive penthouse was built on the cavalier's roof as the residence of the Head of the Mission, and from it one can see an excellent view of the city below as well as the surrounding towns and villages.

Since 2017 the incumbent Ambassador is HE Prince Augusto Ruffo di Calabria.

The cavalier is scheduled as a Grade 1 national monument, and it is also listed on the National Inventory of the Cultural Property of the Maltese Islands.

==== List of representatives ====
Ambassador	Appointed	Credence	End time	Grand Master	Notes
Dino Marrajeni	June 27, 1966	June 27, 1966	?	Angelo de Mojana di Cologna	First representative.
Giampietro Nattino	?	March 22, 2001	?	Andrew Bertie	
Silvano Pedrollo	?	February 24, 2005	?	Andrew Bertie	
Umberto di Capua	?	2007	2016	Andrew Bertie	
Augusto Ruffo di Calabria	February 2017	February 16, 2017	Incumbent	Ludwig Hoffmann-Rumerstein	

== Architecture ==
St. John's Cavalier is a large casemated artillery platform having a pentagonal plan. The structure was not designed with aesthetics in mind, highlighting its purely utilitarian military function. Despite the impression of size given by the external aspect of the building, half of the structure was filled with compressed earth and the rest consisted of series of sparse chambers and a ramp by which cannons could reach the roof.

The cavalier occupies the rear face of St. John's Bastion, and it was meant to be able to fire over the bastion's main parapet, without interfering with its fire. Its terrace contains a gunpowder magazine.

A number of warehouses were grafted on the cavalier in the 17th century, but these were demolished in the 1950s.

== See also ==
- Fortifications of Valletta
