= Monument to Francesco Laparelli and Girolamo Cassar =

Coordinates: 35°53′46″N 14°30′37″E

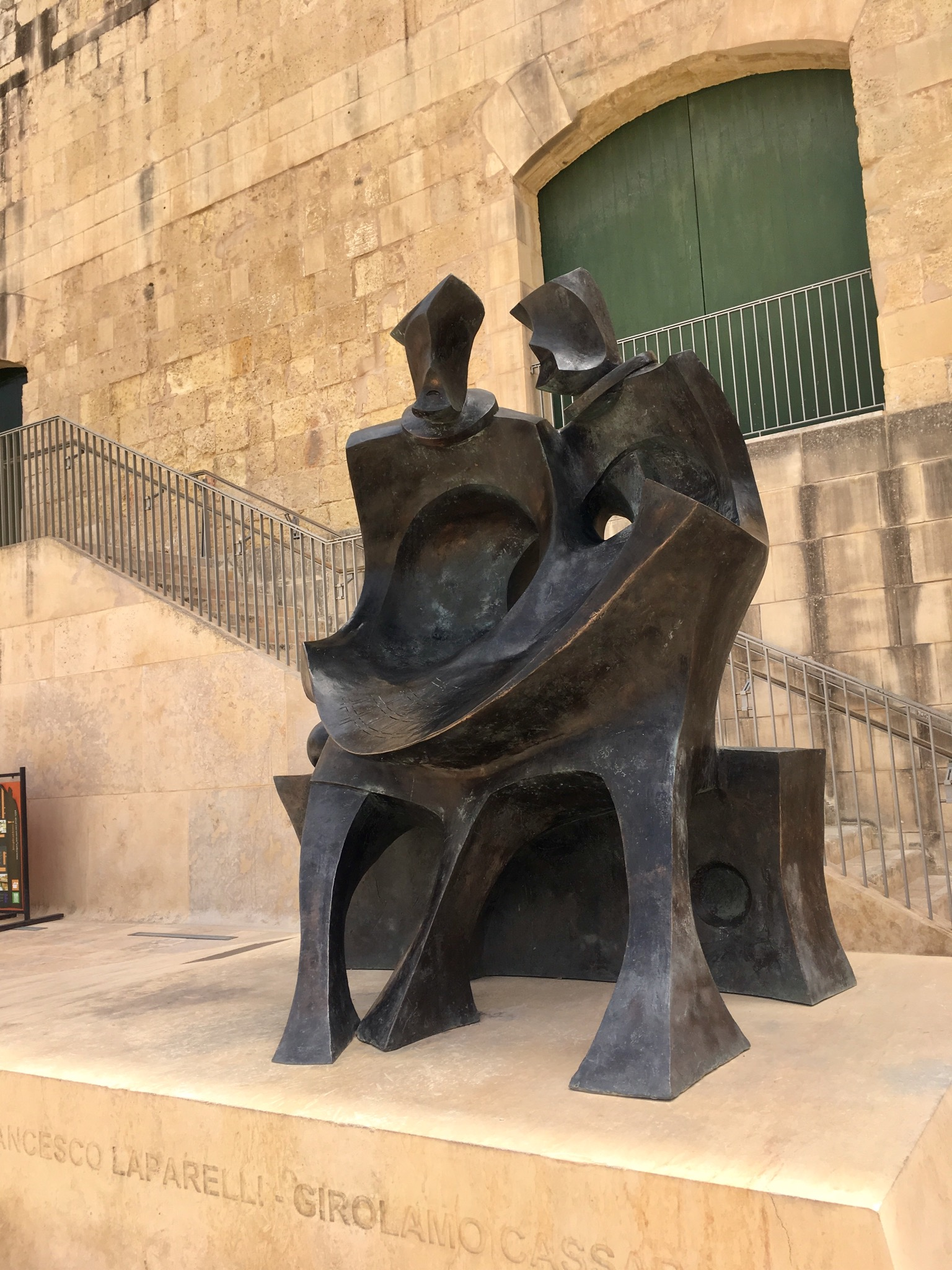
The sculpture in June 2018

A monument to the architects and engineers Francesco Laparelli and Girolamo Cassar is situated between the Parliament House and the ruins of the Royal Opera House in Valletta. It was sculpted by John Grima and unveiled in 2016. Grima said of the work that he wanted to "show the sense of fusion that these two architects had in their work – harmony and marriage joined together".

The monument arose from a letter to the Times of Malta by the historian Albert Ganado in which he lamented the lack of a monument to Francesco Laparelli and Girolamo Cassar, the builders and architects who were responsible for the planning of Valletta in the 16th century.

The monument was funded by the Alfred Mizzi Foundation to mark the centenary of the foundation of Alfred Mizzi & Sons Ltd. The monument was created in collaboration with Heritage Malta. It was unveiled in 2016 to mark the 450th anniversary of the foundation of Valletta.

The monument was unveiled by the Prime Minister of Malta, Joseph Muscat, in December 2016. Muscat said at the unveiling that the monument would "honour the historical jewel of our country".

== Gallery ==
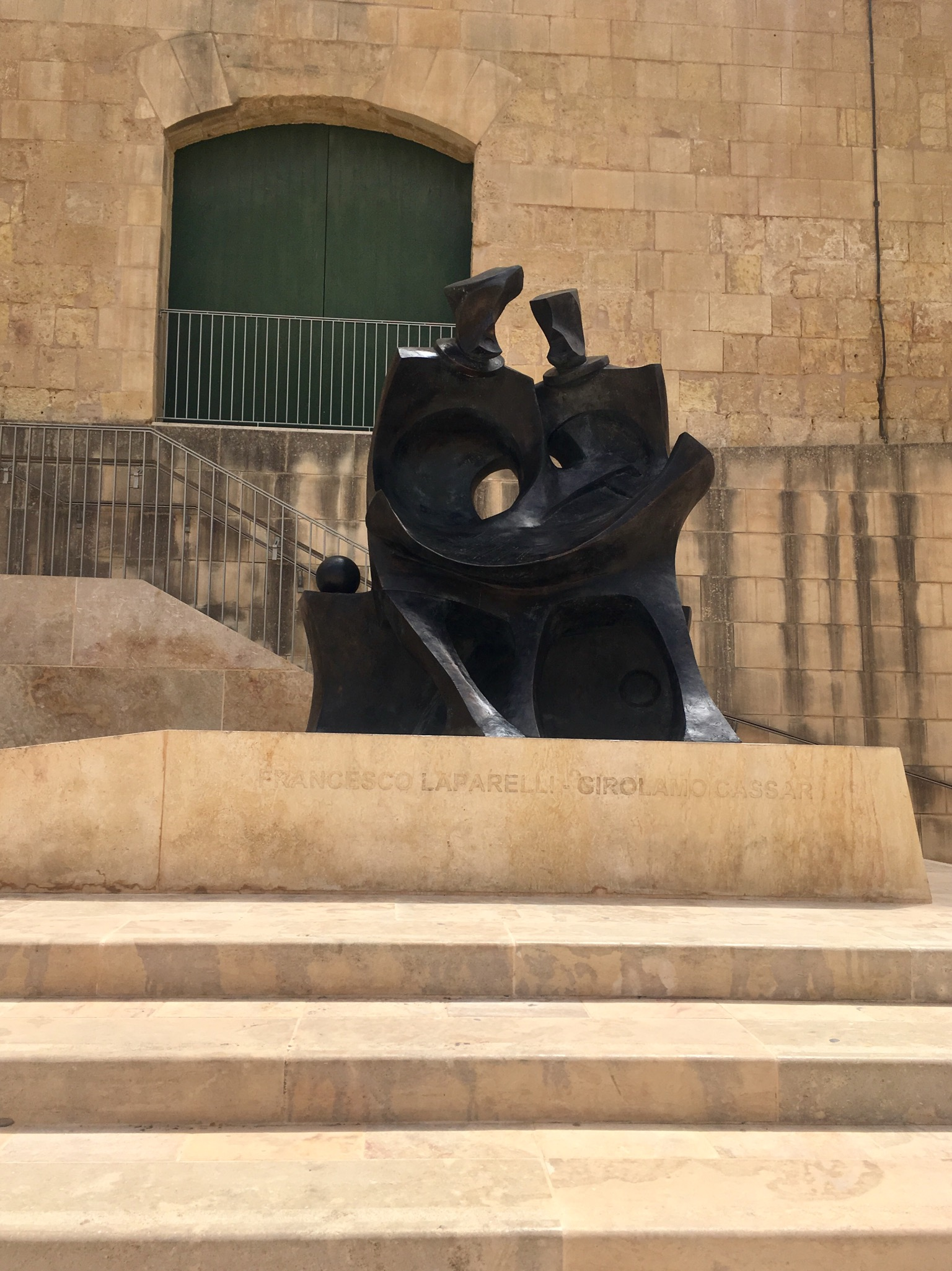

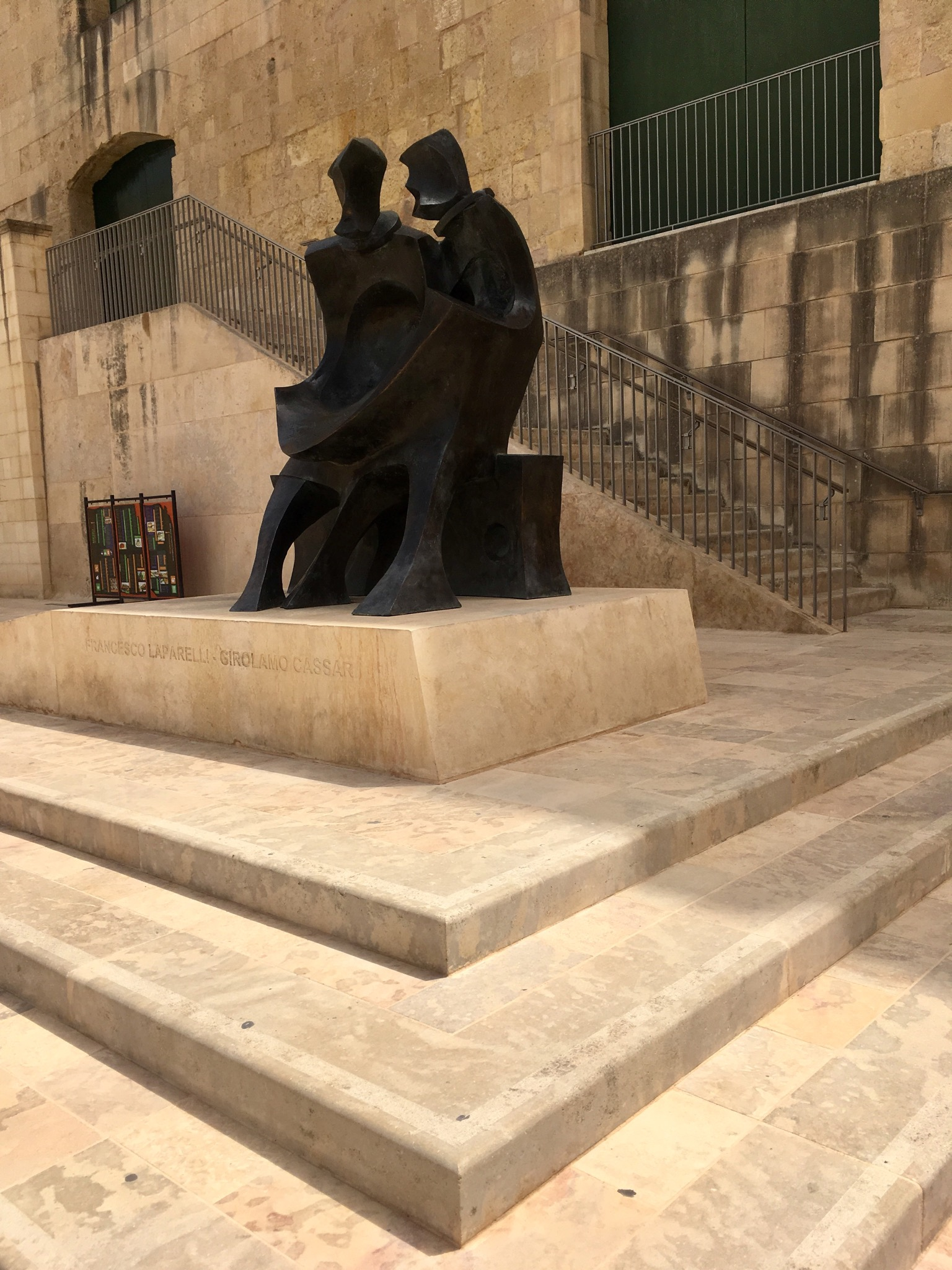

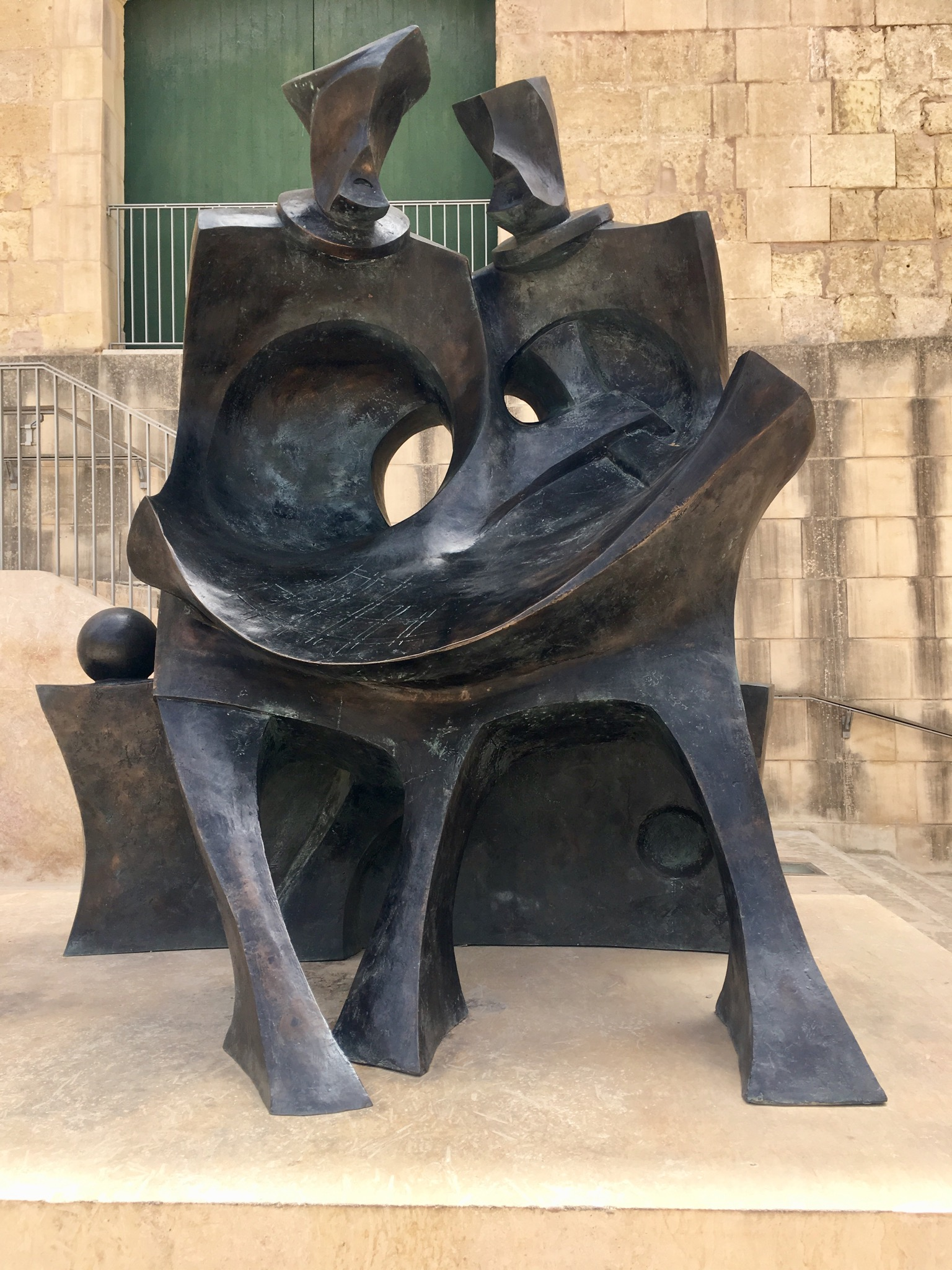

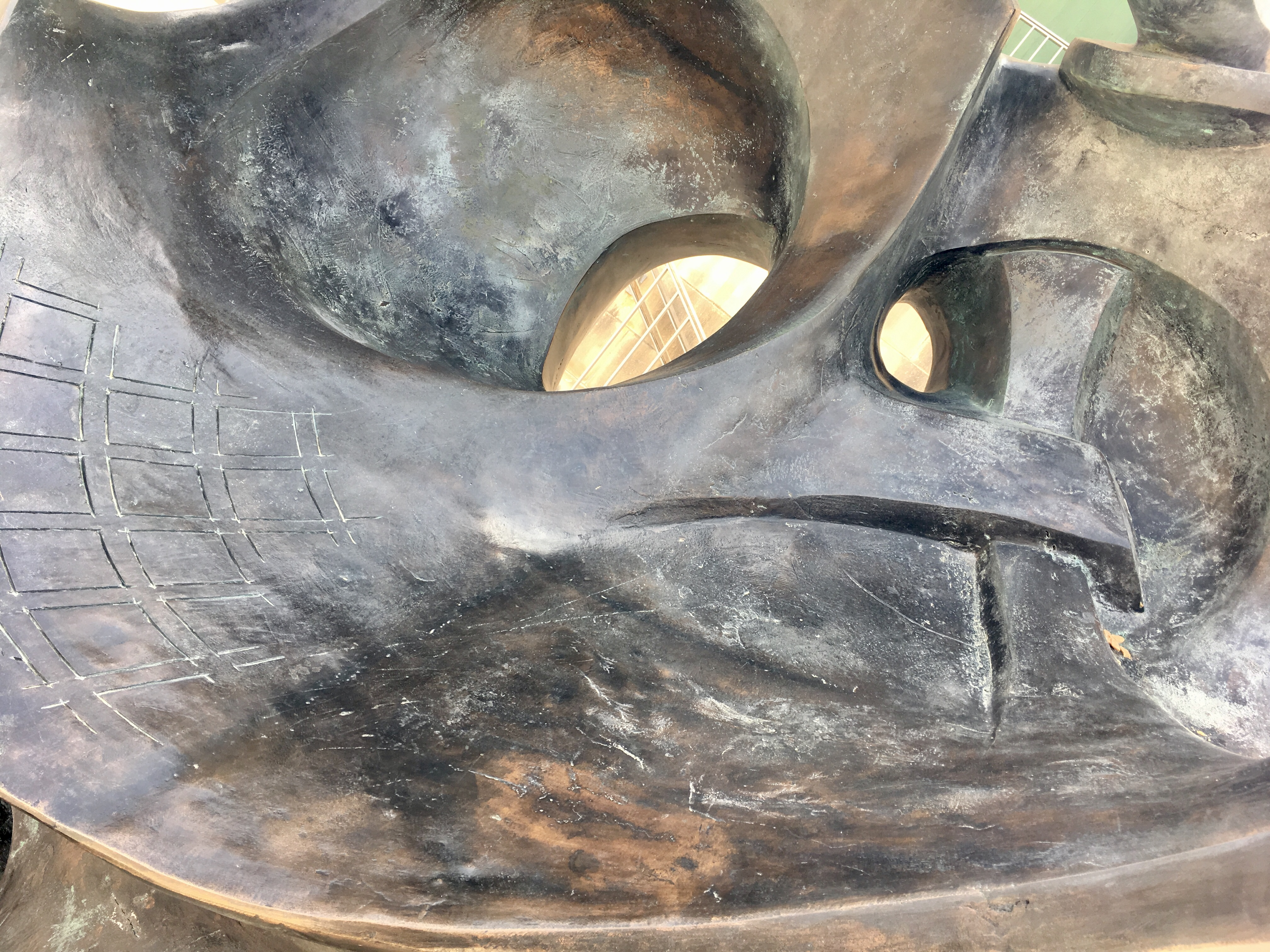
