= Francesco Laparelli =

Italian military engineer (1521–1570)

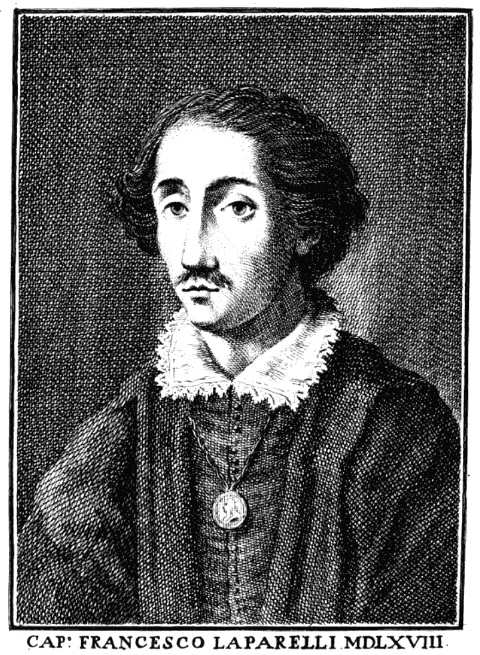
- Born: 5 April 1521; Cortona, Republic of Florence (modern Italy)
- Died: 20 October 1570 (aged 49); Kingdom of Candia (modern Crete)
- Occupation: Military engineer
- Known for: Construction of Valletta

Francesco Laparelli da Cortona (5 April 1521 – 20 October 1570) was an Italian architect. He was an assistant of Michelangelo, and later was sent by the Pope to supervise the construction of Valletta in Malta.

== Early career ==
Laparelli was born in Cortona on 5 April 1521, a member of one of the richest and most illustrious families of Cortona. As a young man, he practiced in the exercise of arms, studied mathematics and architecture along the models defined by Euclid and Vitruvius, and practiced drawing. He was strongly influenced by meeting and working with Gabrio Serbelloni, who was sent to Cortona by Cosimo I de' Medici, Grand Duke of Tuscany to provide for the city's defenses during the conflict between Florence and Siena.

In 1560 Francis Laparelli was called to Rome by Pope Pius IV, at the request of his cousin Serbelloni, with the task of restoring the fortifications of Civitavecchia. In the same year he designed fortifications to defend the new mouth of the Tiber, and in 1561 directed the defense works at Vatican Hill. In 1565 he completed the great bastioned pentagon of the Castel Sant'Angelo, made progress on the defenses of the Vatican, collaborated with Michelangelo Buonarroti on work on the great dome of St. Peter's Basilica and wrote on the stability of the dome.

== Malta ==
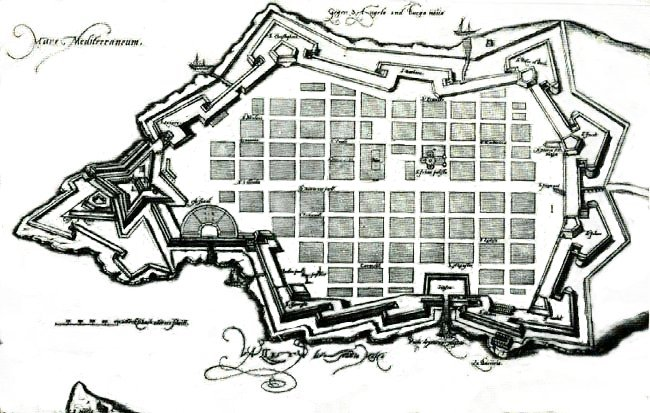
Map of Valletta in the 1580s

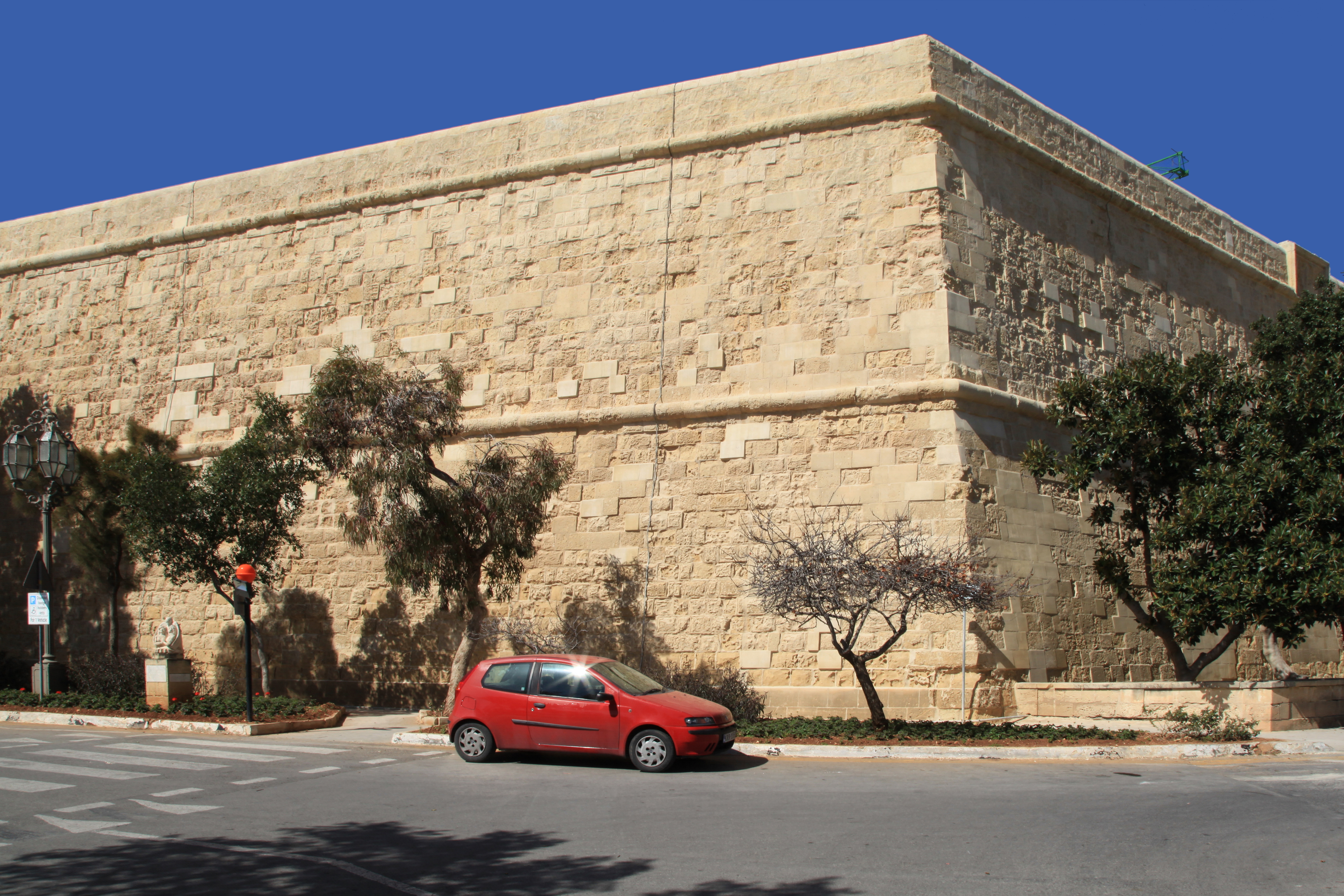
Saint James Cavalier, part of the fortifications of Valletta that retains Laparelli's design.

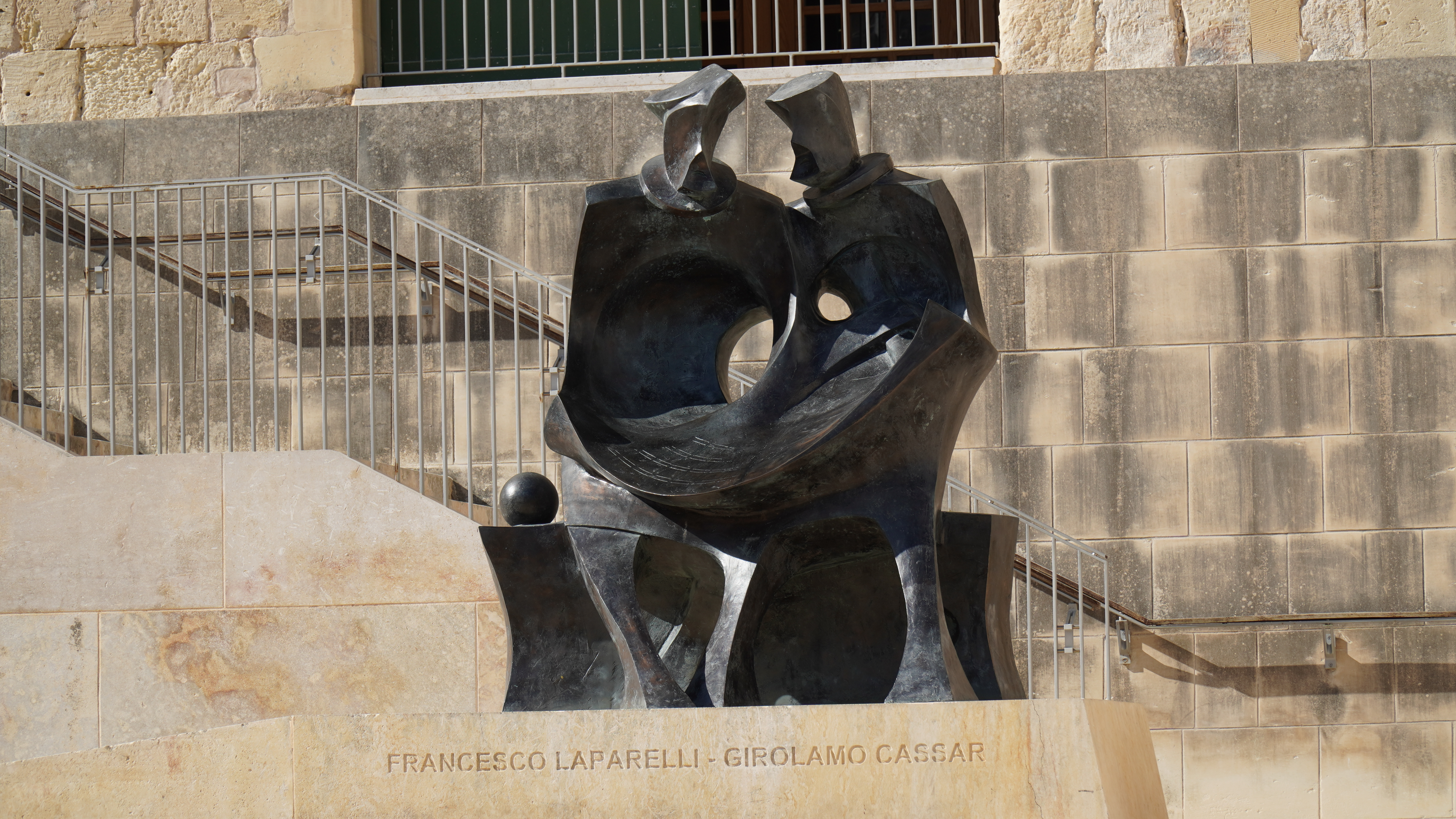
Monument to Francesco Laparelli and Girolamo Cassar, Valletta

The four-month Great Siege of Malta was lifted in September 1565, but the island was ruined. The Grand Master Jean Parisot de la Valette determined to rebuild, choosing the high ground of Mount Sciberras as the site for the new fortress. Francesco Laparelli was commissioned to undertake construction. He was sent to Malta by Pope Pius V, who also provided money for the reconstruction.

Laparelli arrived on the island in December 1565 and gave his first report to the knights on 3 January 1566. He said that the fortications at Birgu, Senglea and St. Elmo had suffered so badly that four thousand laborers working 24 hours a day would be needed to make basic repairs. Instead, he recommended the quicker and cheaper approach of building a new fortification on Mount Sciberras. In a report of 13 January 1566 Laparelli made a more forceful case for the new city, saying that 12,000 foot and 200 horse would be needed to hold the island without it, but only 5,000 foot if it were built. The knights sent messages to the European courts in which threatened to leave Malta if they were not helped by money and troops. On 14 March 1566, after receiving pledges from Spain and others, they decided to proceed.

Laparelli laid out the town plan based on a grid pattern to allow sea breezes to flow through the city more easily in the summer, and designed the drainage system. He specified that ramparts were to surround the city, and Fort Saint Elmo was to be rebuilt at the tip of the Scebarras peninsula. The foundation stone of the new city of Valletta was laid in March 1566. Philip II of Spain sent Giovan Giacomo Paleari Fratino to check the design of the fortifications. Giacomo Bosio has recorded the discourse between el Fratino and Laparelli that took place early in April 1566. The final proposal, published on 18 June 1566, was for a fortified city that extended up the peninsula to Fort Saint Elmo, with four bastions and two cavaliers guarding the landward side. In 1567 the plan was refined to cover making the landward ditch deeper and constructing cisterns, storerooms, magazines and other essential buildings.

Laparelli left Malta in 1569 to help in the naval war of the papacy against the Turks. Construction of the main buildings had not yet begun. Before he was able to return, he died in 1570 at the age of 49 in Crete from the plague. The building of Valletta was continued by his Maltese assistant, Girolamo Cassar.

== Major works ==
- Cortona : Fortezza Medicea o del Girifalco (with Gabrio Serbelloni) (1556)
- Cortona : bell tower of the Cathedral (1566)
- Valletta, Malta : fortifications of the city (1566)

== Legacy ==
A monument to Francesco Laparelli and his collaborator Girolamo Cassar was unveiled in Valletta in 2016.
