= Cavalier (fortification) =

Raised area built to fire over the outer wall

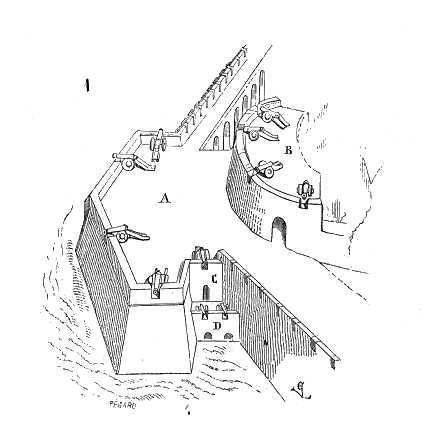
Illustration of a cavalier (the structure on the right, marked as "B") from Dictionnaire raisonné de l’architecture française du XIe au XVIe siècle by Eugène Viollet-le-Duc

A cavalier is a fortification which is built within a larger fortification, and which is higher than the rest of the work. It usually consists of a raised platform within a fort or bastion, so as to be able to fire over the main parapet without interfering with the fire of the latter. Through the use of cavaliers, a greater volume of fire can be obtained, but its greater height also makes it an easier target for a besieger's guns.

There are two types of cavaliers:

- Common cavalier – a raised gun platform without any additional defensive features
- Defensible cavalier – a raised gun platform surrounded by a ditch. If the ditch cuts across the bastion's terreplein and is supported by cuts, the cavalier can also be considered as a retrenchment.

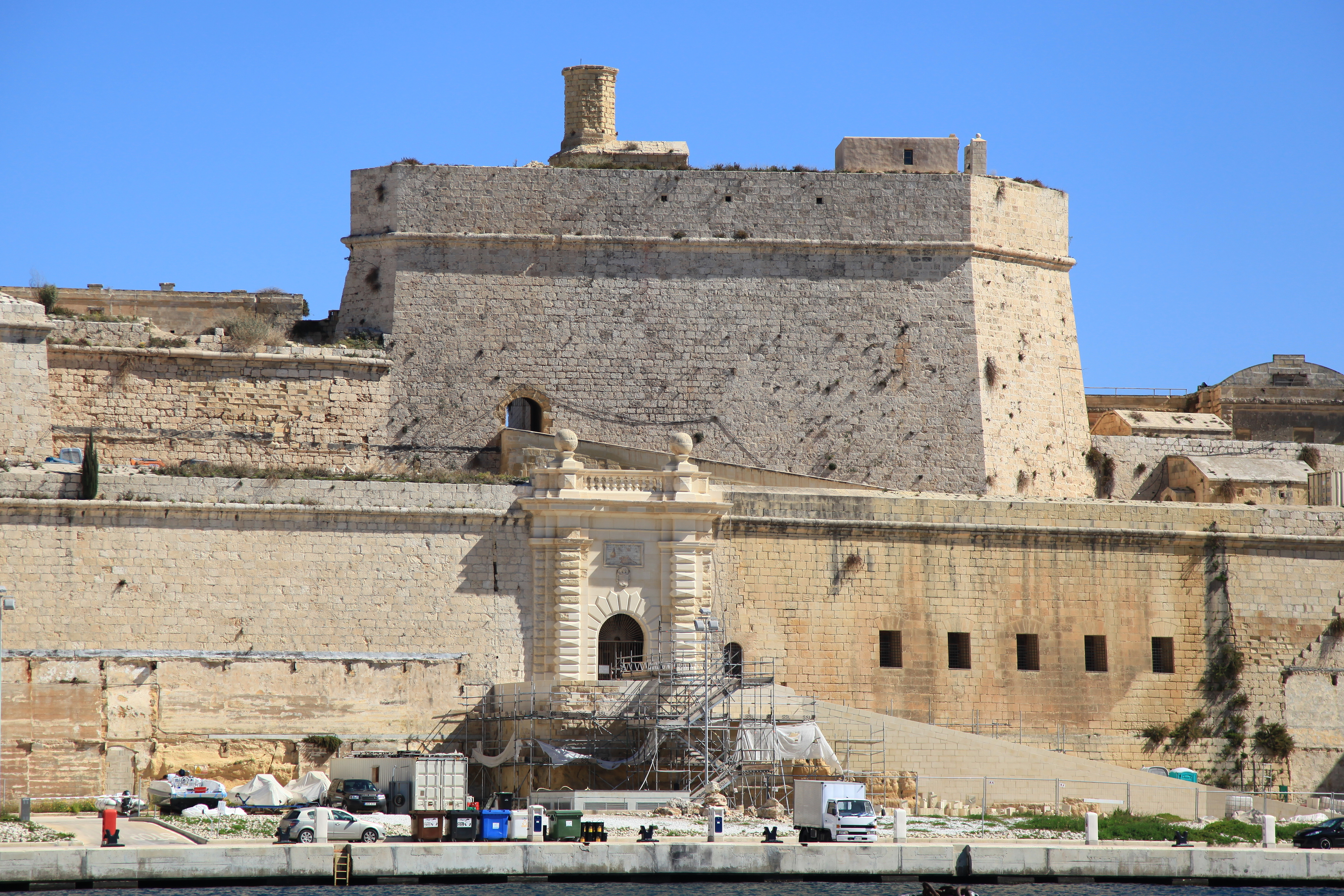
Antonio Ferramolino's Cavalier, Fort St. Angelo, Birgu, Malta
