= Church of Our Lady of Victory, Valletta =

Church of Our Lady of Victory
- Knisja tal-Madonna tal-Vitorja
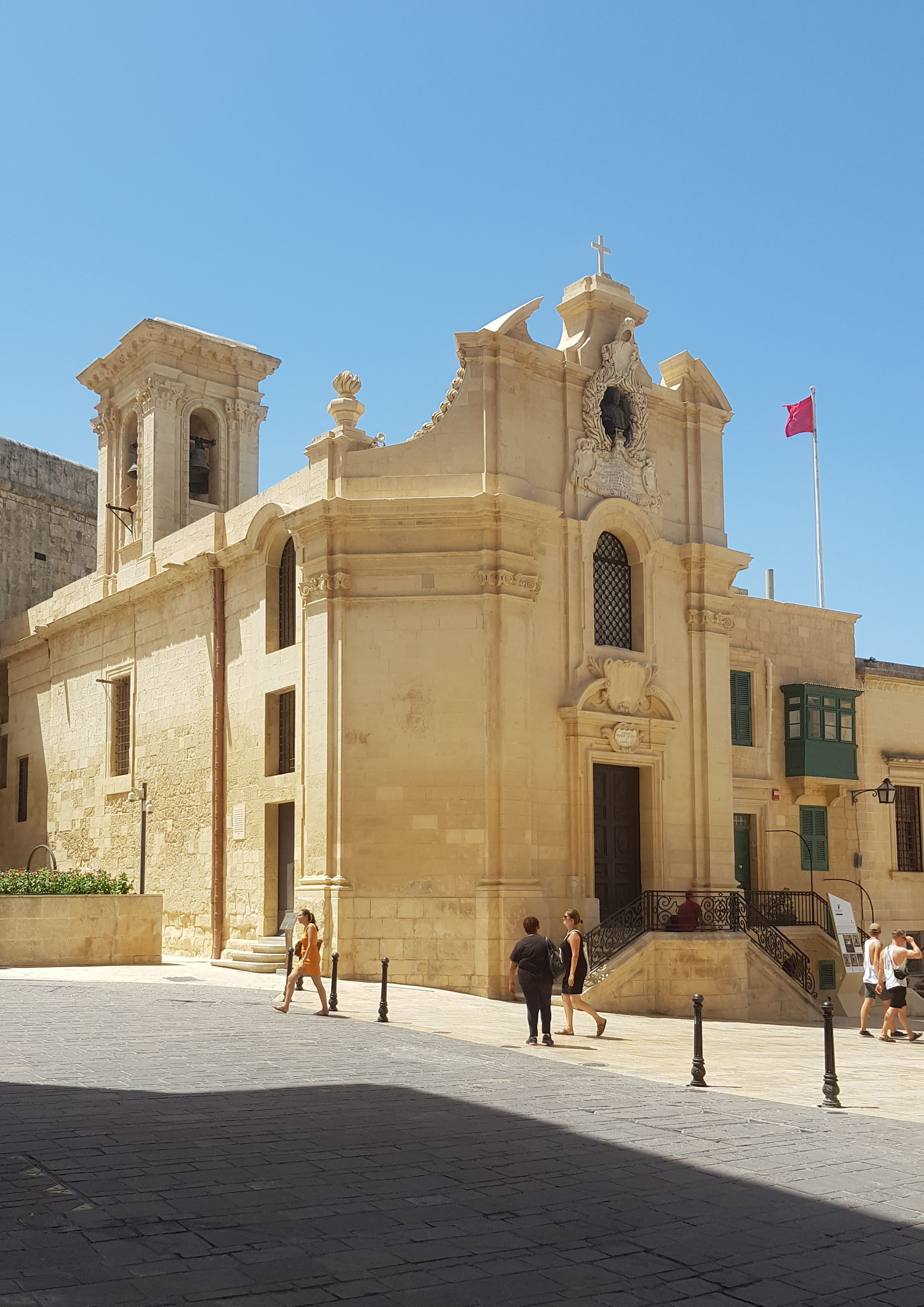
- The church in 2019
- Church of Our Lady of Victory
- 35°53′45.6″N 14°30′38.5″E
- Location: Valletta, Malta
- Denomination: Roman Catholic
- Website: ourladyofvictory.org.mt

History
- Status: Active
- Founded: 1566
- Dedication: Our Lady of Victory

Architecture
- Functional status: Church
- Architectural type: Church
- Style: Baroque

Specifications
- Materials: Limestone

Administration
- Archdiocese: Malta

Clergy
- Rector: Anthony Galea

The Our Lady of Victory Church, formerly known as the Saint Anthony the Abbot Church, was the first church and building completed in Valletta, Malta. In 1566, following the Great Siege of Malta, Grand Master Jean Parisot de Valette and his Order showed interest to build a church in the name of the Nativity of the Virgin as a form of thanksgiving; the construction was funded by de Valette.

== Origins ==
The church was built to commemorate the victory of the Knights of the Order of St John and the Maltese over the Ottoman invaders on 8 September 1565. It was built on the site where a religious ceremony was held to inaugurate the laying of the foundation stone of the new city of Valletta on 28 March 1566. A church was chosen as the first building in order to express gratitude. Not only is the church dedicated to the Nativity of the Virgin, but the titular painting is situated behind the main altar as well and it depicts the birth of the Blessed Virgin.

Grandmaster Jean Parisot de Valette funded the building's construction. He died of a fever on 21 August 1568 and was entombed in the crypt of the church. However, when St. John's Co-Cathedral was built, his remains were moved to there.

In 1617, the order of St John chose this church as their parish church. The church was then dedicated to St Anthony the Abbot. In 1699, the apse of the church was enlarged on the orders of Grand Master Ramon Perellos y Roccaful. In 1716, Maltese artist Alessio Erardi was commissioned by Perellos to paint the vault with elemental scenes portraying the Life of the Virgin; these were finished in two years. In 1752, the façade, sacristy, belfry and the parish priest’s house were enlarged. The façade received a beautiful baroque look. The façade also includes a bronze bust of Pope Innocent XII. In addition, in the second part of the 18th century, apart from the altars dedicated to St John the Baptist and St Paul, two other altars were built.

In 1837, the church became the Garrison Church to the Royal Malta Fencible Regiment which later became the Royal Malta Artillery. Throughout the years, the church experienced several damages both to its structure and to its paintings. On 23 April 1942, the church ceiling was damaged as a consequence of an air raid that hit Valletta which also destroyed the nearby Royal Opera House. In 1943, once again on 8 September another enemy, this time round the Italian fleet, surrenders; the church is now that of 'Our Lady of Victory'.

In 2000, the National trust of Malta, Din l-Art Ħelwa, started a project of restoration. On 8 September 2011, Din l-Art Ħelwa was entrusted as the guardian of the church by the government of Malta. Restoration is ongoing.

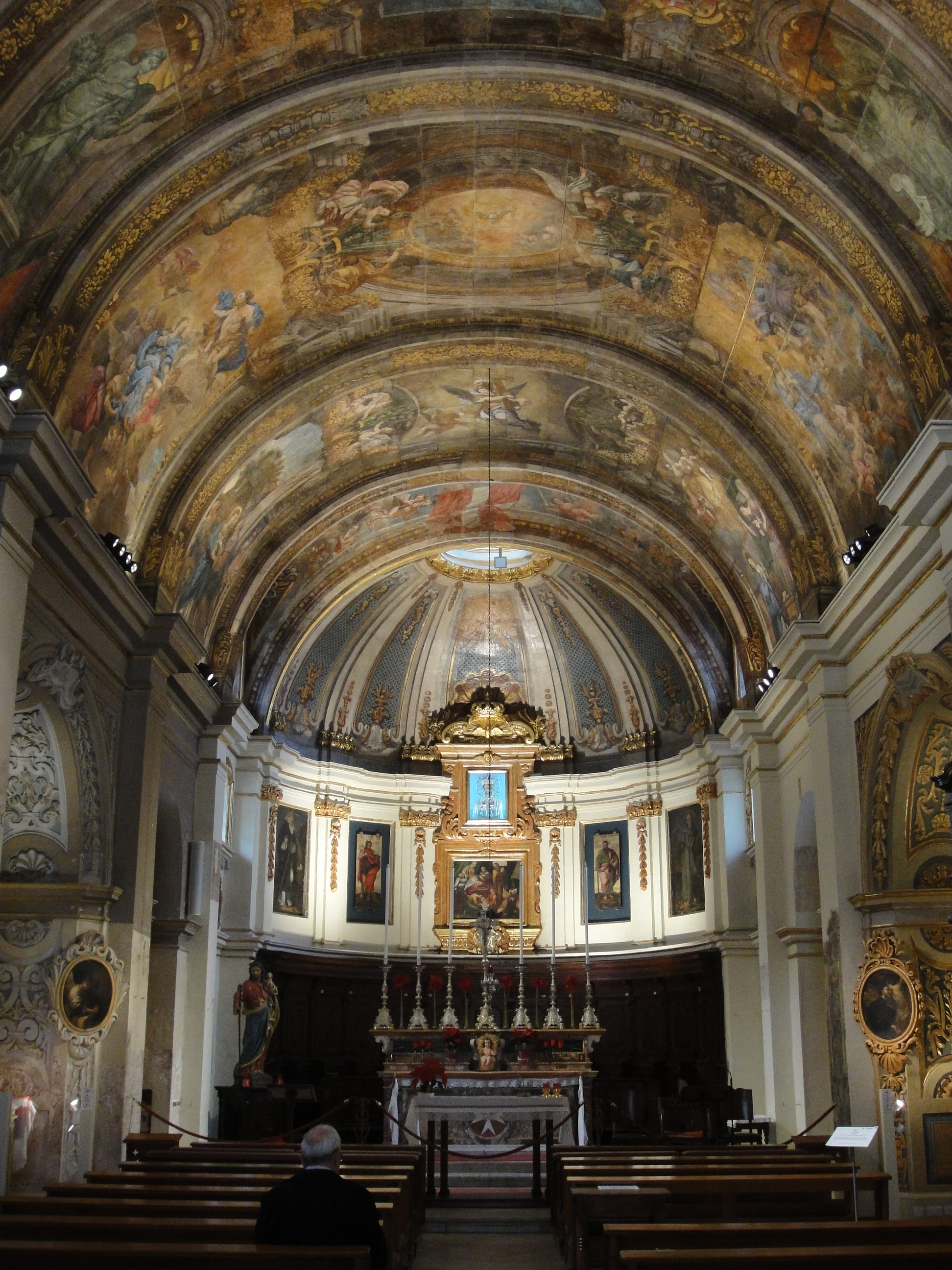
Interior of the church

== Works of art ==
The church has a number of artistic treasures. The paintings on each end above the altar depict St Anthony of Egypt and St Anthony of Padua. These were brought to Malta in 1530 by the Knights of Malta after the Emperor Charles V gave the island to the Order of St John as its base. The church also contains works by Francesco Zahra, Ermenegildo Grech and Enrico Arnaux.

In 1792, Venetian Grand Admiral Angelo Emo died in Malta. He wished for his heart to be buried in the Lady of Victory church; a monument in his name by Maltese sculptor Vincenzo Dimech was erected in 1802.

== Present day ==
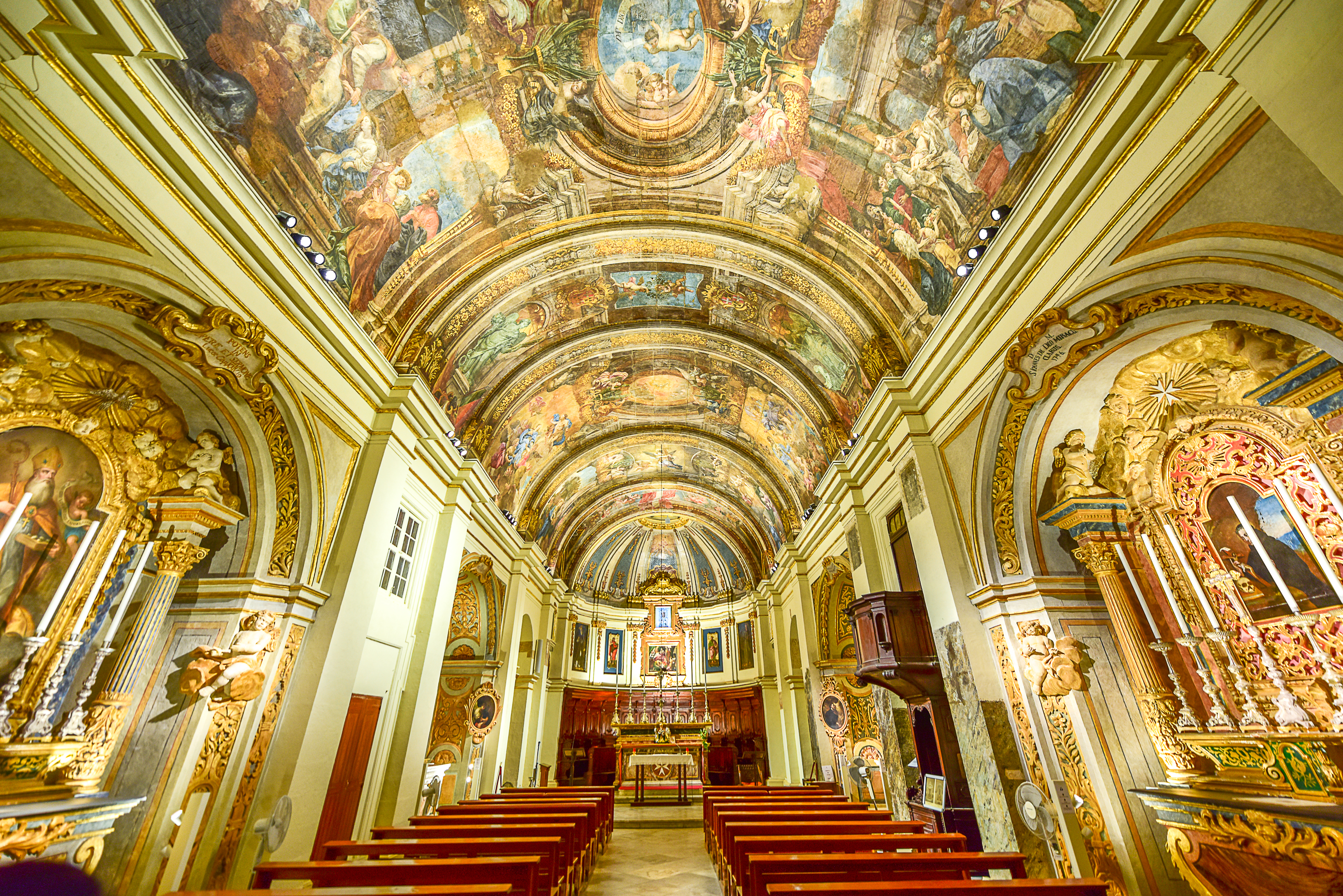
Interior

In 2000, the National trust of Malta, Din l-Art Ħelwa, started a project of restoration along with the Valletta Rehabilitation Project and the Museums Department. Restoration was carried out on the roof, finials and part of the belfry, which was sponsored by Computime. The exterior restoration was completed by 2002; PricewaterhouseCoopers was a major sponsor. The interior renovation started in 2004. The church was restored between 2015 and 2016.

The church building is listed on the National Inventory of the Cultural Property of the Maltese Islands.

The church is open to the public for free.

== See also ==
- Culture of Malta
- History of Malta
- List of churches in Malta
- Religion in Malta
